= List of State of the Union addresses =

Annual report by the president of the United States

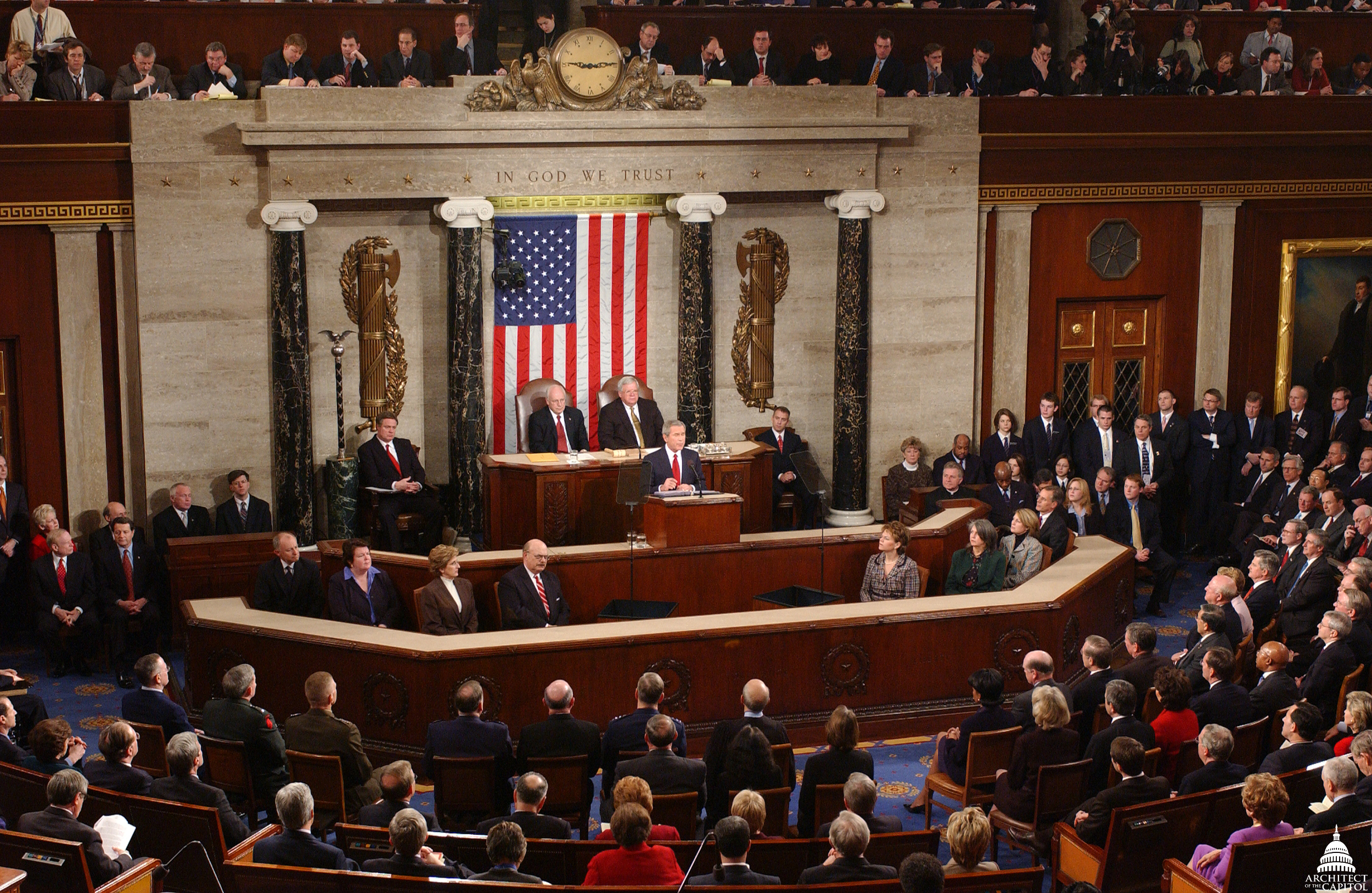
George W. Bush during his 2005 State of the Union address

This is a list of State of the Union addresses. The State of the Union is the constitutionally mandated annual report by the president of the United States, the head of the U.S. federal executive departments, to the United States Congress, the U.S. federal legislative body.

William Henry Harrison and James A. Garfield are the only presidents in U.S. history to not deliver a State of the Union, as they both died within their first year in office before they could do so.

Before 1933, the State of the Union was delivered at the end of the calendar year. The ratification of the 20th Amendment in 1933 changed the opening of Congress from early March to early January, affecting the delivery of the annual message. There was none in 1933, and since 1934, it has been in January, February, or March.

Starting in 1981, presidents have been invited to address a joint session of Congress early in the first year of their presidency. These have reflected the style of a State of the Union address. However, the addresses are not officially titled "State of the Union" but "Address to Joint Session of Congress" or like that instead. Since 1989, the opposition party has offered a response. There were unofficial addresses by newly inaugurated presidents in 1981, 1989, 1993, 2001, 2009, 2017, 2021, and 2025.

== List ==
Year	President	Format	Date	Word count	Time (minutes)
Jan 1790	George Washington	Spoken	Jan 8	1,089	Unknown
Dec 1790	George Washington	Spoken	Dec 8	1,401	Unknown
1791	George Washington	Spoken	Oct 25	2,302	Unknown
1792	George Washington	Spoken	Nov 6	2,101	Unknown
1793	George Washington	Spoken	Dec 3	1,968	Unknown
1794	George Washington	Spoken	Nov 19	2,918	Unknown
1795	George Washington	Spoken	Dec 8	1,989	Unknown
1796	George Washington	Spoken	Dec 7	2,871	Unknown
1797	John Adams	Spoken	Nov 22	2,063	Unknown
1798	John Adams	Spoken	Dec 8	2,218	Unknown
1799	John Adams	Spoken	Dec 3	1,505	Unknown
1800	John Adams	Spoken	Nov 22	1,372	Unknown
1801	Thomas Jefferson	Written	Dec 8	3,224	—N/a
1802	Thomas Jefferson	Written	Dec 15	2,197	—N/a
1803	Thomas Jefferson	Written	Oct 17	2,263	—N/a
1804	Thomas Jefferson	Written	Nov 8	2,096	—N/a
1805	Thomas Jefferson	Written	Dec 3	2,927	—N/a
1806	Thomas Jefferson	Written	Dec 2	2,860	—N/a
1807	Thomas Jefferson	Written	Oct 27	2,384	—N/a
1808	Thomas Jefferson	Written	Nov 8	2,675	—N/a
1809	James Madison	Written	Nov 29	1,831	—N/a
1810	James Madison	Written	Dec 5	2,446	—N/a
1811	James Madison	Written	Nov 5	2,273	—N/a
1812	James Madison	Written	Nov 4	3,242	—N/a
1813	James Madison	Written	Dec 7	3,257	—N/a
1814	James Madison	Written	Sep 20	2,111	—N/a
1815	James Madison	Written	Dec 5	3,146	—N/a
1816	James Madison	Written	Dec 3	3,364	—N/a
1817	James Monroe	Written	Dec 12	4,418	—N/a
1818	James Monroe	Written	Nov 16	4,376	—N/a
1819	James Monroe	Written	Dec 7	4,702	—N/a
1820	James Monroe	Written	Nov 14	3,446	—N/a
1821	James Monroe	Written	Dec 3	5,814	—N/a
1822	James Monroe	Written	Dec 3	4,723	—N/a
1823	James Monroe	Written	Dec 2	6,358	—N/a
1824	James Monroe	Written	Dec 7	8,400	—N/a
1825	John Quincy Adams	Written	Dec 6	8,985	—N/a
1826	John Quincy Adams	Written	Dec 5	7,705	—N/a
1827	John Quincy Adams	Written	Dec 4	6,917	—N/a
1828	John Quincy Adams	Written	Dec 2	7,282	—N/a
1829	Andrew Jackson	Written	Dec 8	10,525	—N/a
1830	Andrew Jackson	Written	Dec 6	15,114	—N/a
1831	Andrew Jackson	Written	Dec 6	7,178	—N/a
1832	Andrew Jackson	Written	Dec 4	7,863	—N/a
1833	Andrew Jackson	Written	Dec 3	7,877	—N/a
1834	Andrew Jackson	Written	Dec 1	13,411	—N/a
1835	Andrew Jackson	Written	Dec 7	10,825	—N/a
1836	Andrew Jackson	Written	Dec 5	12,367	—N/a
1837	Martin Van Buren	Written	Dec 5	11,449	—N/a
1838	Martin Van Buren	Written	Dec 3	11,488	—N/a
1839	Martin Van Buren	Written	Dec 2	13,431	—N/a
1840	Martin Van Buren	Written	Dec 5	8,991	—N/a
—N/a	William Henry Harrison	—N/a	—N/a	—N/a	—N/a
1841	John Tyler	Written	Dec 7	8,241	—N/a
1842	John Tyler	Written	Dec 6	8,417	—N/a
1843	John Tyler	Written	Dec 5	8,036	—N/a
1844	John Tyler	Written	Dec 3	9,318	—N/a
1845	James K. Polk	Written	Dec 2	16,111	—N/a
1846	James K. Polk	Written	Dec 8	18,222	—N/a
1847	James K. Polk	Written	Dec 7	16,414	—N/a
1848	James K. Polk	Written	Dec 5	21,309	—N/a
1849	Zachary Taylor	Written	Dec 4	7,617	—N/a
1850	Millard Fillmore	Written	Dec 2	8,322	—N/a
1851	Millard Fillmore	Written	Dec 2	13,244	—N/a
1852	Millard Fillmore	Written	Dec 6	9,929	—N/a
1853	Franklin Pierce	Written	Dec 5	9,590	—N/a
1854	Franklin Pierce	Written	Dec 4	10,139	—N/a
1855	Franklin Pierce	Written	Dec 31	11,612	—N/a
1856	Franklin Pierce	Written	Dec 2	10,486	—N/a
1857	James Buchanan	Written	Dec 8	13,655	—N/a
1858	James Buchanan	Written	Dec 6	16,349	—N/a
1859	James Buchanan	Written	Dec 19	12,336	—N/a
1860	James Buchanan	Written	Dec 3	14,049	—N/a
1861	Abraham Lincoln	Written	Dec 3	6,987	—N/a
1862	Abraham Lincoln	Written	Dec 1	8,385	—N/a
1863	Abraham Lincoln	Written	Dec 8	6,114	—N/a
1864	Abraham Lincoln	Written	Dec 6	5,865	—N/a
1865	Andrew Johnson	Written	Dec 4	9,232	—N/a
1866	Andrew Johnson	Written	Dec 3	7,134	—N/a
1867	Andrew Johnson	Written	Dec 3	12,002	—N/a
1868	Andrew Johnson	Written	Dec 9	9,834	—N/a
1869	Ulysses S. Grant	Written	Dec 6	7,706	—N/a
1870	Ulysses S. Grant	Written	Dec 5	8,743	—N/a
1871	Ulysses S. Grant	Written	Dec 4	6,459	—N/a
1872	Ulysses S. Grant	Written	Dec 2	10,102	—N/a
1873	Ulysses S. Grant	Written	Dec 1	10,026	—N/a
1874	Ulysses S. Grant	Written	Dec 7	9,819	—N/a
1875	Ulysses S. Grant	Written	Dec 7	12,211	—N/a
1876	Ulysses S. Grant	Written	Dec 5	6,799	—N/a
1877	Rutherford B. Hayes	Written	Dec 3	10,724	—N/a
1878	Rutherford B. Hayes	Written	Dec 2	7,879	—N/a
1879	Rutherford B. Hayes	Written	Dec 1	11,635	—N/a
1880	Rutherford B. Hayes	Written	Dec 6	13,347	—N/a
—N/a	James A. Garfield	—N/a	—N/a	—N/a	—N/a
1881	Chester A. Arthur	Written	Dec 6	13,321	—N/a
1882	Chester A. Arthur	Written	Dec 4	10,274	—N/a
1883	Chester A. Arthur	Written	Dec 4	8,363	—N/a
1884	Chester A. Arthur	Written	Dec 1	8,917	—N/a
1885	Grover Cleveland	Written	Dec 8	19,960	—N/a
1886	Grover Cleveland	Written	Dec 6	15,285	—N/a
1887	Grover Cleveland	Written	Dec 6	5,290	—N/a
1888	Grover Cleveland	Written	Dec 3	13,226	—N/a
1889	Benjamin Harrison	Written	Dec 1	13,004	—N/a
1890	Benjamin Harrison	Written	Dec 1	11,522	—N/a
1891	Benjamin Harrison	Written	Dec 9	16,306	—N/a
1892	Benjamin Harrison	Written	Dec 6	13,680	—N/a
1893	Grover Cleveland	Written	Dec 4	12,282	—N/a
1894	Grover Cleveland	Written	Dec 3	15,892	—N/a
1895	Grover Cleveland	Written	Dec 2	14,670	—N/a
1896	Grover Cleveland	Written	Dec 7	15,453	—N/a
1897	William McKinley	Written	Dec 6	12,113	—N/a
1898	William McKinley	Written	Dec 5	20,224	—N/a
1899	William McKinley	Written	Dec 5	22,831	—N/a
1900	William McKinley	Written	Dec 3	19,142	—N/a
1901	Theodore Roosevelt	Written	Dec 3	19,616	—N/a
1902	Theodore Roosevelt	Written	Dec 5	9,782	—N/a
1903	Theodore Roosevelt	Written	Dec 7	14,943	—N/a
1904	Theodore Roosevelt	Written	Dec 6	17,415	—N/a
1905	Theodore Roosevelt	Written	Dec 5	25,071	—N/a
1906	Theodore Roosevelt	Written	Dec 3	23,609	—N/a
1907	Theodore Roosevelt	Written	Dec 3	27,397	—N/a
1908	Theodore Roosevelt	Written	Dec 8	19,411	—N/a
1909	William Howard Taft	Written	Dec 7	13,901	—N/a
1910	William Howard Taft	Written	Dec 6	27,651	—N/a
1911	William Howard Taft	Written	Dec 5	23,744 (Note: In 1911 President Taft submitted his written message in four parts on Dec 5, Dec 7, Dec 20, and Dec 21. This word count includes all four parts.)	—N/a
1912	William Howard Taft	Written	Dec 3	25,161 (Note: In 1912 President Taft submitted his written message in three parts on Dec 3, Dec 6, and Dec 19. This word count includes all three parts.)	—N/a
1913	Woodrow Wilson	Spoken	Dec 2	3,553	Unknown
1914	Woodrow Wilson	Spoken	Dec 8	4,537	Unknown
1915	Woodrow Wilson	Spoken	Dec 7	7,687	Unknown
1916	Woodrow Wilson	Spoken	Dec 5	2,118	Unknown
1917	Woodrow Wilson	Spoken	Dec 4	3,913	Unknown
1918	Woodrow Wilson	Spoken	Dec 2	5,463	Unknown
1919	Woodrow Wilson	Written	Dec 2	4,756	—N/a
1920	Woodrow Wilson	Written	Dec 7	2,706	—N/a
1921	Warren G. Harding	Spoken	Dec 6	5,606	Unknown
1922	Warren G. Harding	Spoken	Dec 8	5,748	Unknown
1923	Calvin Coolidge	Spoken	Dec 6	6,706	Unknown
1924	Calvin Coolidge	Written	Dec 3	6,968	—N/a
1925	Calvin Coolidge	Written	Dec 8	10,848	—N/a
1926	Calvin Coolidge	Written	Dec 7	10,305	—N/a
1927	Calvin Coolidge	Written	Dec 6	8,777	—N/a
1928	Calvin Coolidge	Written	Dec 4	8,061	—N/a
1929	Herbert Hoover	Written	Dec 3	10,994	—N/a
1930	Herbert Hoover	Written	Dec 5	4,536	—N/a
1931	Herbert Hoover	Written	Dec 8	5,682	—N/a
1932	Herbert Hoover	Written	Dec 6	4,201	—N/a
1933	—N/a	—N/a	—N/a	—N/a	—N/a
1934	Franklin D. Roosevelt	Spoken	Jan 3	2,230	Unknown
1935	Franklin D. Roosevelt	Spoken	Jan 4	3,525	Unknown
1936	Franklin D. Roosevelt	Spoken	Jan 3	3,826	50
1937	Franklin D. Roosevelt	Spoken	Jan 6	2,732	Unknown
1938	Franklin D. Roosevelt	Spoken	Jan 3	4,697	Unknown
1939	Franklin D. Roosevelt	Spoken	Jan 4	3,768	Unknown
1940	Franklin D. Roosevelt	Spoken	Jan 3	3,196	Unknown
1941	Franklin D. Roosevelt	Spoken	Jan 6	3,312	36
1942	Franklin D. Roosevelt	Spoken	Jan 6	3,511	Unknown
1943	Franklin D. Roosevelt	Spoken	Jan 7	4,588	Unknown
1944	Franklin D. Roosevelt	Written	Jan 11	3,805	—N/a
1945	Franklin D. Roosevelt	Written	Jan 6	8,211	—N/a
1946	Harry S. Truman	Written	Jan 21	27,465	—N/a
1947	Harry S. Truman	Spoken	Jan 6	6,028	Unknown
1948	Harry S. Truman	Spoken	Jan 7	5,094	Unknown
1949	Harry S. Truman	Spoken	Jan 5	3,401	Unknown
1950	Harry S. Truman	Spoken	Jan 4	5,130	Unknown
1951	Harry S. Truman	Spoken	Jan 8	3,994	Unknown
1952	Harry S. Truman	Spoken	Jan 9	5,369	Unknown
1953	Harry S. Truman	Written	Jan 7	9,683	—N/a
1953	Dwight D. Eisenhower	Spoken	Feb 2	6,973	56
1954	Dwight D. Eisenhower	Spoken	Jan 7	5,985	52
1955	Dwight D. Eisenhower	Spoken	Jan 6	7,250	53
1956	Dwight D. Eisenhower	Written	Jan 5	8,265	—N/a
1957	Dwight D. Eisenhower	Spoken	Jan 10	4,137	33
1958	Dwight D. Eisenhower	Spoken	Jan 9	4,915	44
1959	Dwight D. Eisenhower	Spoken	Jan 9	4,933	42
1960	Dwight D. Eisenhower	Spoken	Jan 7	5,633	45
1961	Dwight D. Eisenhower	Written	Jan 12	6,210	—N/a
1961	John F. Kennedy	Spoken	Jan 30	5,274	43
1962	John F. Kennedy	Spoken	Jan 11	6,569	53
1963	John F. Kennedy	Spoken	Jan 14	5,470	43
1964	Lyndon B. Johnson	Spoken	Jan 8	3,168	41
1965	Lyndon B. Johnson	Spoken	Jan 4	4,399	47
1966	Lyndon B. Johnson	Spoken	Jan 12	5,542	51
1967	Lyndon B. Johnson	Spoken	Jan 10	7,195	71
1968	Lyndon B. Johnson	Spoken	Jan 17	4,914	50
1969	Lyndon B. Johnson	Spoken	Jan 14	4,115	44
1970	Richard Nixon	Spoken	Jan 22	4,457	37
1971	Richard Nixon	Spoken	Jan 22	4,508	33
1972	Richard Nixon	Spoken	Jan 20	3,976	29
1973	Richard Nixon	Written	Feb 2	27,147 (Note: In 1973, President Nixon delivered a series of six written State of the Union messages to Congress from February 2 to March 14. One message was an overview, followed by five additional messages each of which focused on a specific public policy theme. This word count includes all six messages.)	—N/a
1974	Richard Nixon	Spoken	Jan 30	5,144	43
1975	Gerald Ford	Spoken	Jan 15	4,126	41
1976	Gerald Ford	Spoken	Jan 19	4,948	51
1977	Gerald Ford	Spoken	Jan 12	4,727	45
1978	Jimmy Carter	Spoken	Jan 19	4,580	46
1979	Jimmy Carter	Spoken	Jan 25	3,257	33
1980	Jimmy Carter	Spoken	Jan 21	3,412	32
1981	Jimmy Carter	Written	Jan 16	33,667	—N/a
1981 (Note: Starting in 1981, presidents have been invited to address a joint session of Congress early in the first year of their presidency. These have reflected the style of a State of the Union address but are not officially titled as a "State of the Union." Since 1989 the opposition party has offered a response.)	Ronald Reagan	Spoken	Feb 18	4,446	33
1982	Ronald Reagan	Spoken	Jan 26	5,154	40
1983	Ronald Reagan	Spoken	Jan 25	5,554	46
1984	Ronald Reagan	Spoken	Jan 25	4,931	43
1985	Ronald Reagan	Spoken	Feb 6	4,214	40
1986	Ronald Reagan	Spoken	Feb 4	3,514	31
1987	Ronald Reagan	Spoken	Jan 27	3,847	35
1988	Ronald Reagan	Spoken	Jan 25	4,955	44
1989	George H. W. Bush	Spoken	Feb 9	4,811	48
1990	George H. W. Bush	Spoken	Jan 31	3,777	36
1991	George H. W. Bush	Spoken	Jan 29	3,823	47
1992	George H. W. Bush	Spoken	Jan 28	5,012	51
1993	Bill Clinton	Spoken	Feb 17	7,003	66
1994	Bill Clinton	Spoken	Jan 25	7,432	64
1995	Bill Clinton	Spoken	Jan 24	9,190	85
1996	Bill Clinton	Spoken	Jan 23	6,317	67
1997	Bill Clinton	Spoken	Feb 4	6,774	64
1998	Bill Clinton	Spoken	Jan 27	7,303	77
1999	Bill Clinton	Spoken	Jan 19	7,514	79
2000	Bill Clinton	Spoken	Jan 27	7,452	89
2001	George W. Bush	Spoken	Feb 27	4,362	49
2002	George W. Bush	Spoken	Jan 29	3,878	48
2003	George W. Bush	Spoken	Jan 28	5,413	60
2004	George W. Bush	Spoken	Jan 20	5,229	54
2005	George W. Bush	Spoken	Feb 2	5,096	53
2006	George W. Bush	Spoken	Jan 31	5,323	51
2007	George W. Bush	Spoken	Jan 23	5,590	49
2008	George W. Bush	Spoken	Jan 28	5,760	53
2009	Barack Obama	Spoken	Feb 24	5,902	52
2010	Barack Obama	Spoken	Jan 27	7,304	69
2011	Barack Obama	Spoken	Jan 25	6,878	62
2012	Barack Obama	Spoken	Jan 24	7,059	65
2013	Barack Obama	Spoken	Feb 12	6,775	60
2014	Barack Obama	Spoken	Jan 28	6,989	65
2015	Barack Obama	Spoken	Jan 20	6,718	60
2016	Barack Obama	Spoken	Jan 12	6,044	59
2017	Donald Trump	Spoken	Feb 28	5,006	60
2018	Donald Trump	Spoken	Jan 30	5,839	81
2019	Donald Trump	Spoken	Feb 5	5,540	82
2020	Donald Trump	Spoken	Feb 4	6,217	78
2021	Joe Biden	Spoken	Apr 28	8,003	65
2022	Joe Biden	Spoken	Mar 1	7,705	62
2023	Joe Biden	Spoken	Feb 7	9,216	73
2024	Joe Biden	Spoken	Mar 7	8,078	67
2025	Donald Trump	Spoken	Mar 4	9,831	99
2026	Donald Trump	Spoken	Feb 24	10,599	108

== See also ==
- Article Two of the United States Constitution § Section 3: Presidential responsibilities
- List of joint sessions of the United States Congress
