= Timeline of the Theodore Roosevelt presidency =

The presidency of Theodore Roosevelt began on September 14, 1901, when Theodore Roosevelt was inaugurated as the 26th president of the United States following the assassination of William McKinley, and it ended on March 4, 1909.

== 1901 ==
- September 14 - The first inauguration of Theodore Roosevelt takes place following the death of William McKinley.
- September 15 - Roosevelt and the cabinet attend memorial services for McKinley.
- September 16 - Roosevelt and the cabinet escort McKinley's body to Washington, D.C.
- September 20 - Roosevelt holds his first cabinet meeting.
- September 28 - The Battle of Balangiga occurs in the Philippines.
- October 16 - Roosevelt meets Booker T. Washington at the White House.
- October 17 - Roosevelt gives the White House its official name.
- October 23 - Roosevelt receives an honorary doctorate of law from Yale University.
- October 29 - Leon Czolgosz is executed for the murder of William McKinley.
- November 14 - Roosevelt expands the Navajo Nation.
- November 18 - The United States and Great Britain sign the Hay-Pauncefote Treaty.
- November 30 - Roosevelt fires Oklahoma Territory governor William Miller Jenkins and replaces him with Thompson Benton Ferguson.
- December 3 - Roosevelt delivers the 1901 State of the Union Address.
- December 13 - Roosevelt inherits a fortune from his late uncle Cornelius Roosevelt.

== 1902 ==
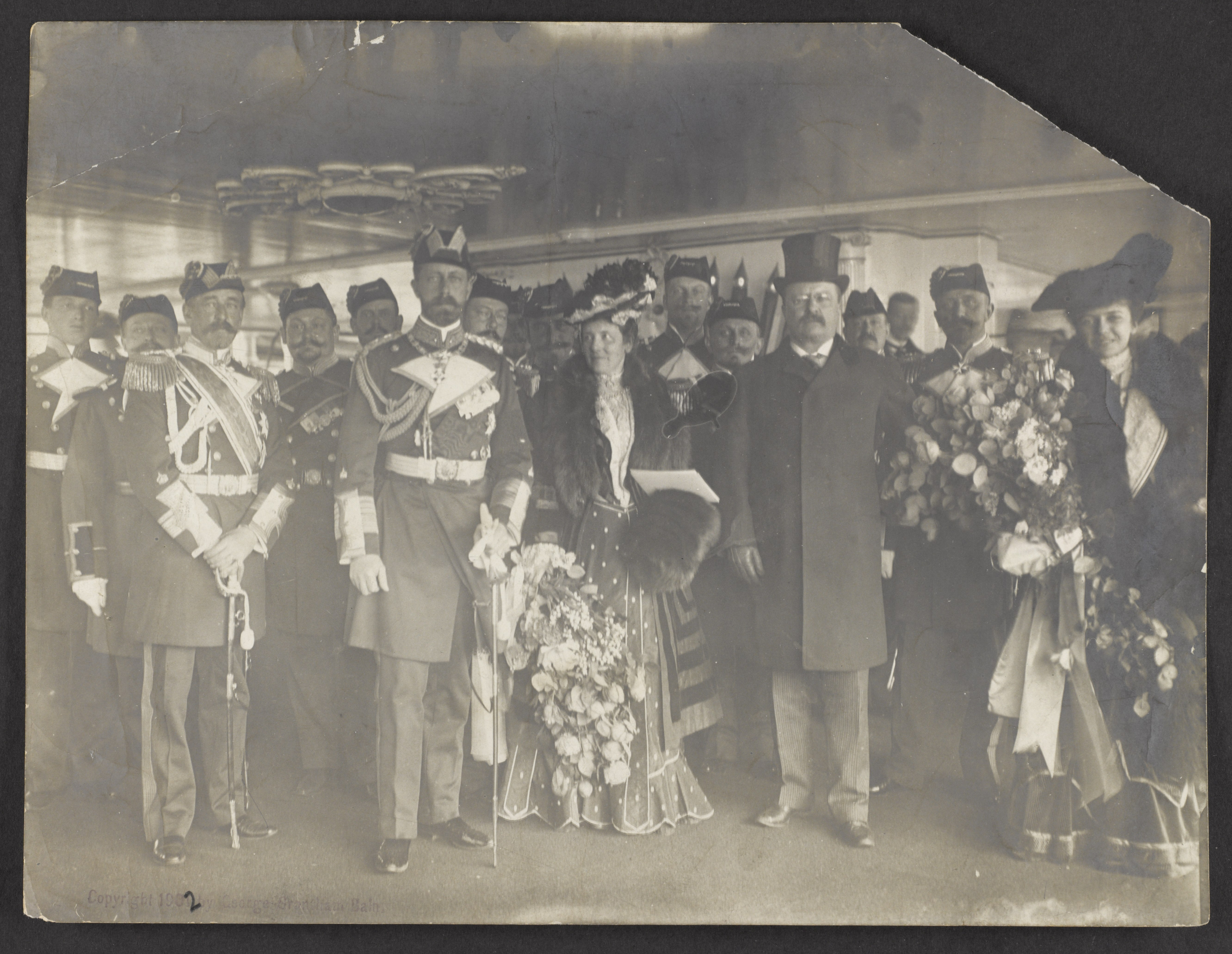
Roosevelt meets Prince Henry of Prussia. February 1902.

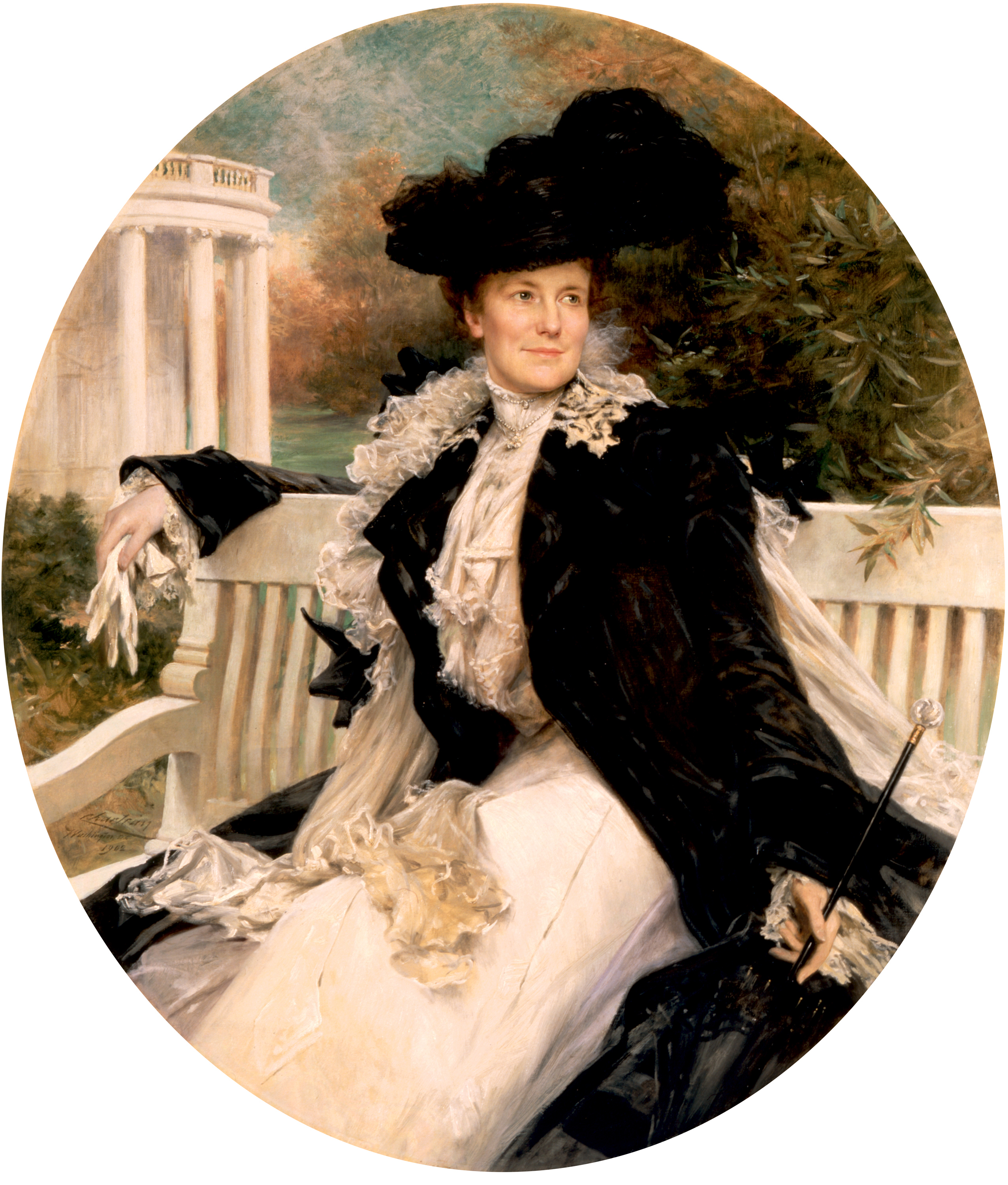
Portrait of Mrs Roosevelt by Theobald Chartain

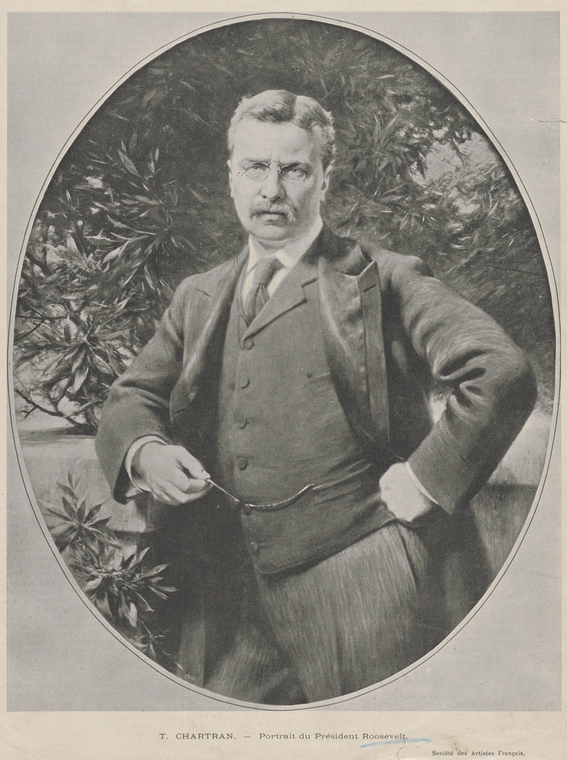
Portrait of President Roosevelt by Theobald Chartain

- January 3 - Roosevelt's daughter Alice Roosevelt is presented as a debutante.
- January 8 - Postmaster General Charles Emory Smith resigns. He's replaced by Henry Clay Payne.
- January 31 - Secretary of the Treasury Lyman J. Gage resigns to work in the private sector.
- February 1 - L. M. Shaw takes office as Secretary of the Treasury.
- February 18 - Roosevelt orders the prosecution of the Northern Securities Company for violation of the Sherman Antitrust Act.
- February 24 - Roosevelt meets Prince Henry of Prussia at the White House.
- February 25 - Roosevelt and Prince Henry of Prussia travel to New York.
- April 22 - Roosevelt orders the court martial of Jacob H. Smith for his actions at the Battle of Balangiga.
- April 29 - The Chinese Exclusion Act is extended indefinitely.
- April 30 - Secretary of the Navy John Davis Long resigns. He is replaced by William Henry Moody.
- May 12 - The coal strike of 1902 begins.
- May 20 - Cuba gains independence from the United States.
- May 22 - Crater Lake is established as a National Park.
- May 31 - Roosevelt orders a 14% reduction of the United States Army.
- June 16 - Roosevelt meets the first Cuban ambassador to the United States.
- June 17 - Roosevelt signs the Newlands Reclamation Act into law.
- July 2 - The Philippine–American War ends.
- July 4 - Roosevelt issues amnesty for all Filipino participates of the Philippine-American War.
- August 22 - Roosevelt becomes the first sitting president to ride in an automobile.
- October 3 - Roosevelt personally arbitrates the coal strike.
- November 4 - Republicans maintain control of both chambers of Congress in the 1902 United States elections.
- December 2 - Roosevelt delivers the 1902 State of the Union Address.
- December 2 - Roosevelt nominates Oliver Wendell Holmes Jr. to the Supreme Court.
- December 4 - Oliver Wendell Holmes Jr. is confirmed as an Associate Justice of the Supreme Court.

== 1903 ==
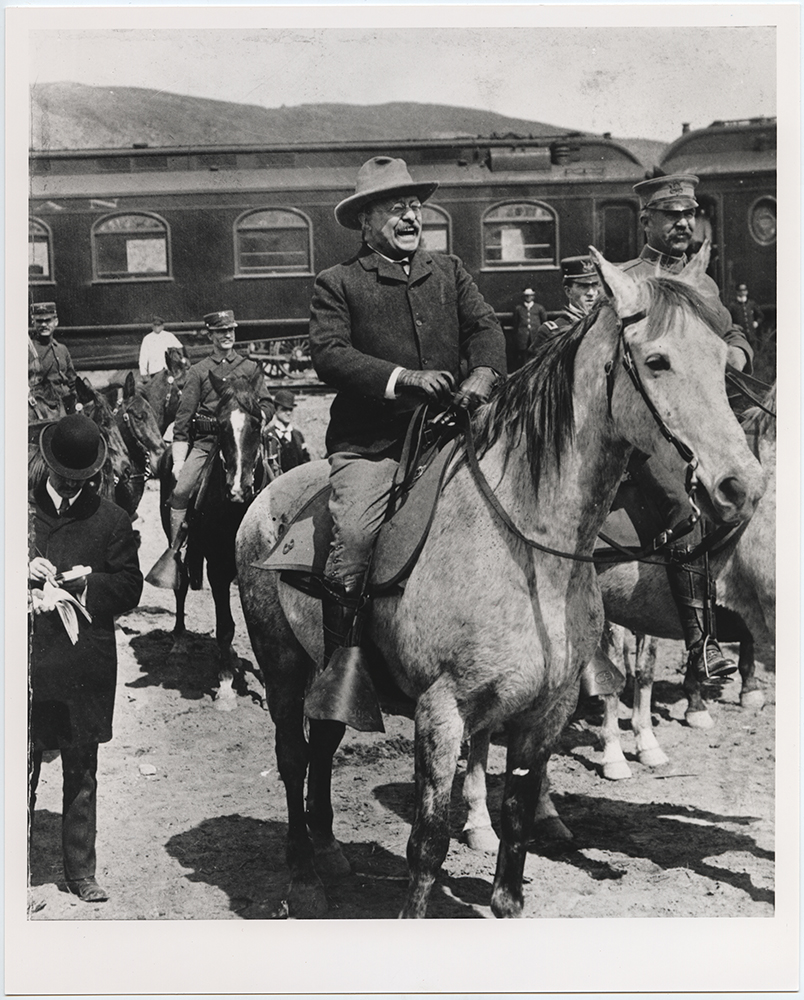
Roosevelt visits Yellowstone National Park. April 8, 1903.

- January 2 - Roosevelt orders a post office in Indianola, Mississippi closed after they refuse to accept an African American postmistress.
- February 11 - Roosevelt signs the Expediting Act into law.
- February 14 - The Department of Commerce and Labor is created.
- February 19 - Roosevelt signs the Elkins Act into law as part of his Square Deal.
- February 19 - Roosevelt nominates William R. Day to the Supreme Court.
- February 23 - William R. Day is confirmed as an associate justice of the Supreme Court.
- March 3 - Roosevelt signs the Immigration Act of 1903.
- May 14 - Roosevelt visits San Francisco.
- November 3 - Panama declares independence with United States backing.
- November 18 - The United States and Panama sign the Hay–Bunau-Varilla Treaty.
- December 7 - Roosevelt delivers the 1903 State of the Union Address.

== 1904 ==
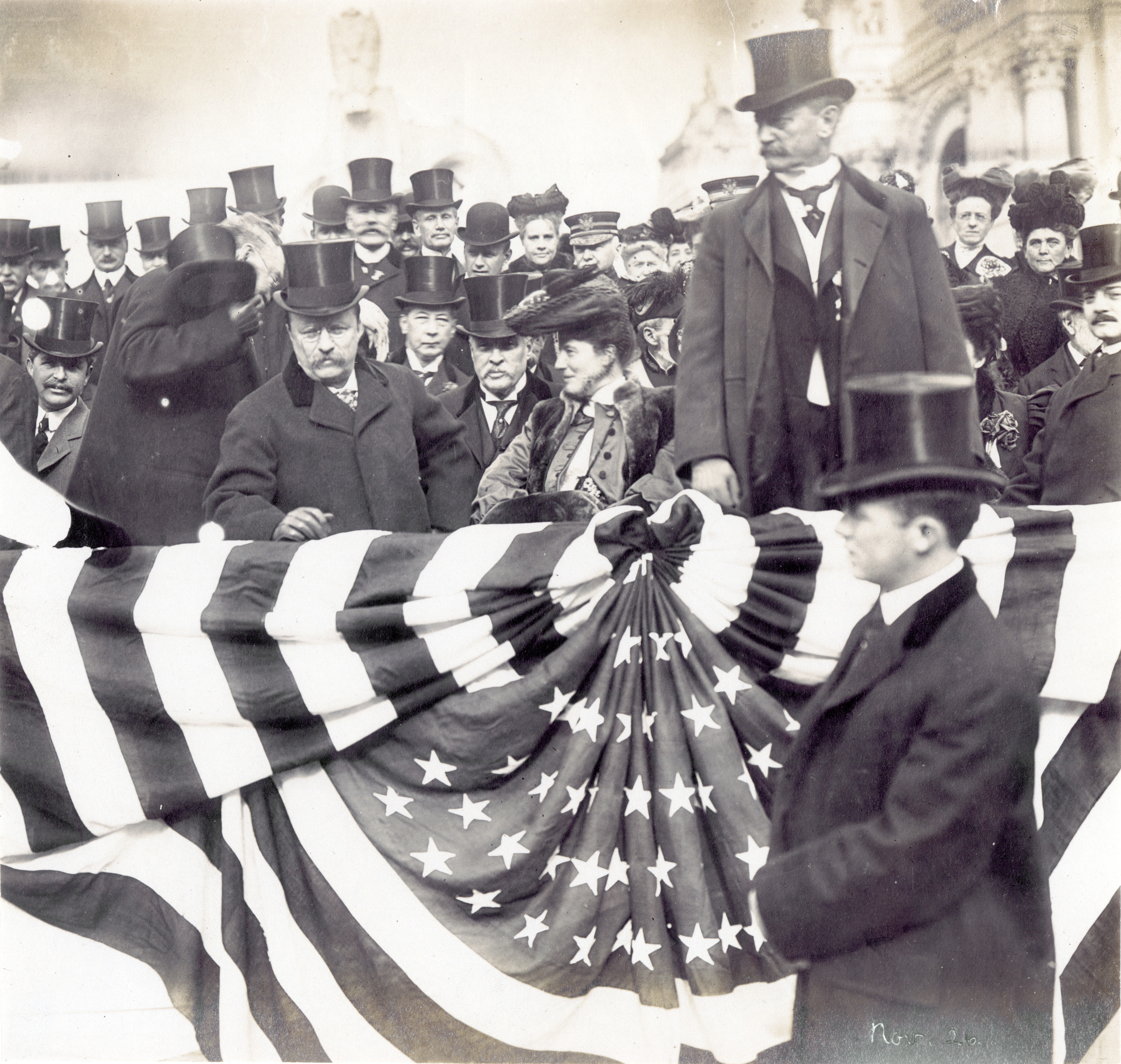
Roosevelt at the World's Fair. November 26, 1904.

- January 29 - Edith Roosevelt hosts a performance by Ferruccio Busoni at the White House.
- January 31 - Secretary of War Elihu Root resigns to work in the private sector.
- February 1 - William Howard Taft takes office as Secretary of War.
- February 1 - Roosevelt meets with Bat Masterson at the White House.
- February 11 - Roosevelt declares neutrality in the Russo-Japanese War.
- February 22 - A mentally ill man with a revolver is arrested at the White House.
- February 23 - The United States purchases the Panama Canal Zone.
- April 15 - Roosevelt arrives in New Castle, Colorado for a hunting trip.
- April 27 - Roosevelt falls ill and delays his hunting trip.
- April 28 - Roosevelt signs the Kinkaid Act into law.
- May 4 - The United States takes over construction of the Panama Canal
- June 21 - Roosevelt is chosen as the Republican presidential nominee for 1904.
- June 30 - Attorney General Philander C. Knox resigns to serve as a U.S. Senator. Several cabinet secretaries are moved into new positions.
- July 1 - The Cuban–American Treaty of Relations comes into effect.
- October 4 - Postmaster General Henry Clay Payne dies at the age of 60.
- October 10 - Robert Wynne takes office as Postmaster General.
- November 8 - Roosevelt wins reelection against Alton B. Parker.
- December 6 - Roosevelt establishes the Roosevelt Corollary as he delivers the 1904 State of the Union Address.
- December 12 - The Battle of Dolores River occurs in the Philippines.

== 1905 ==
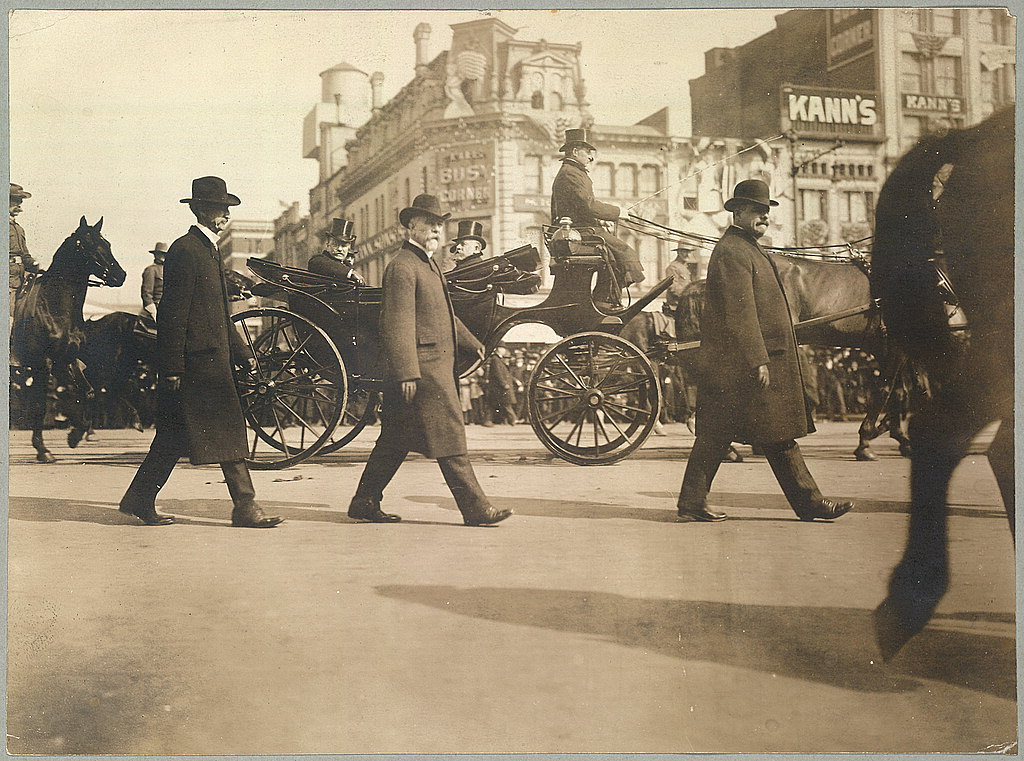
Roosevelt traveling to his second inauguration. March 4, 1905.

- January 20 - The United States takes control of the foreign affairs of the Dominican Republic.
- February 1 - The National Forest Service is established.
- March 4 - The second inauguration of Theodore Roosevelt takes place.
- March 17 - Roosevelt attends the wedding of his niece Eleanor Roosevelt and distant cousin Franklin D. Roosevelt.
- June 30 - Secretary of the Navy Paul Morton resigns. He is replaced by Charles Joseph Bonaparte.
- July 1 - Secretary of State John Hay dies of a heart condition at the age of 66.
- July 19 - Former Secretary of War Elihu Root takes office as Secretary of State.
- July 27 - The Taft–Katsura agreement is made between Secretary of War William Howard Taft and Japanese Prime Minister Katsura Tarō.
- September 5 - Roosevelt facilitates the signing of the Treaty of Portsmouth between Japan and Russia, ending the Russo-Japanese War.
- October 22 - The Battle of the Malalag River occurs in the Philippines.
- December 5 - Roosevelt delivers the 1905 State of the Union Address.

== 1906 ==
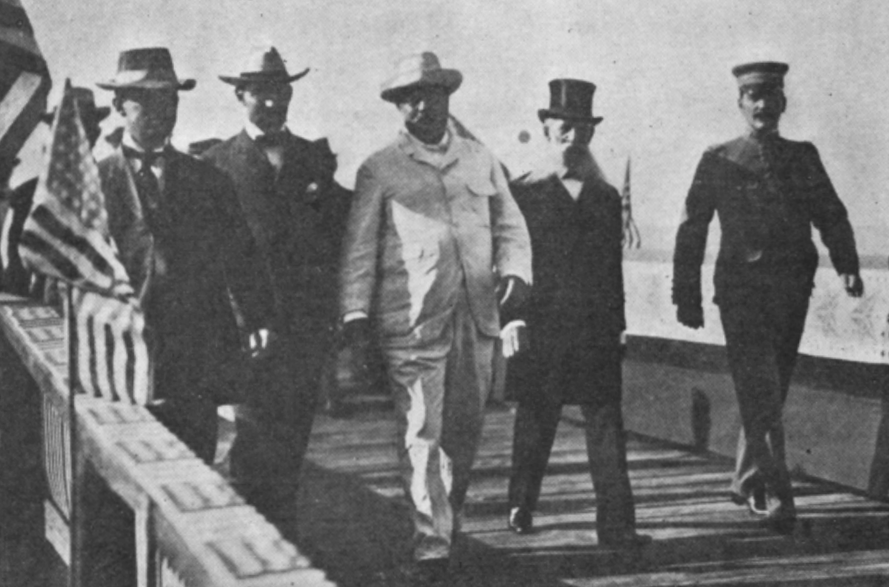
Roosevelt arrives in Puerto Rico. December 11, 1906.

- March 5 - The First Battle of Bud Dajo occurs in the Philippines.
- April 14 - Roosevelt denounces the practice of muckracking in the progressive movement.
- April 18 - The San Francisco earthquake kills up to 3,000 people and destroys over 80% of the city of San Francisco
- May 8 - Roosevelt signs the Burke Act into law.
- June 8 - Roosevelt signs the Antiquities Act into law.
- June 16 - Roosevelt signs the Oklahoma Enabling Act into law.
- June 29 - Roosevelt signs the Hepburn Act into law.
- June 30 - Roosevelt signs the Pure Food and Drug Act and the Federal Meat Inspection Act into law.
- August 12 - The Brownsville affair begins.
- August 23 - Cuban President Tomás Estrada Palma requests American military assistance.
- September 24 - Roosevelt establishes Devils Tower as the first national monument.
- October 6 - American soldiers arrive in Cuba and the Second Occupation of Cuba begins.
- November 6 - Republicans maintain control of both chambers of Congress in the 1906 United States elections.
- November 9 - Roosevelt visits the Panama Canal Zone to oversee the construction of the Panama Canal, becoming the first sitting president to leave the mainland United States.
- December 3 - Roosevelt delivers the 1906 State of the Union Address.
- December 3 - Roosevelt nominates Attorney General William Henry Moody to the Supreme Court.
- December 10 - Roosevelt is awarded the Nobel Peace Prize for his role in ending the Russo-Japanese War, becoming the first American to win a Nobel Prize.
- December 12 - William Henry Moody is confirmed as an associate justice of the Supreme Court. Several cabinet secretaries are moved into new positions.

== 1907 ==
- January 1 - Roosevelt sets the record of most hands shaken in one day by a head of state with 8,513.
- January 14 - Postmaster General George B. Cortelyou resigns. He's replaced by Ambassador to Russia George von Lengerke Meyer.
- January 26 - Roosevelt signs the Tillman Act of 1907 into law.
- February 15 - The Gentlemen's Agreement of 1907 is signed by the United States and Japan.
- February 20 - Roosevelt signs the Immigration Act of 1907 into law.
- February 26 - Roosevelt appoints General George Washington Goethals chief engineer of the Panama Canal.
- March 3 - Secretary of the Treasury L. M. Shaw resigns to work in the private sector.
- March 4 - George B. Cortelyou takes office as Secretary of the Treasury. Secretary of the Interior Ethan A. Hitchcock resigns and is replaced by James Rudolph Garfield.
- June 11 - The War of 1907 begins.
- June 15 - The Second International Peace Conference is held at Roosevelt's request.
- October 22 - The Panic of 1907 begins.
- November 3 - Roosevelt approves U.S. Steel's takeover of the Tennessee Coal, Iron and Railroad Company.
- November 16 - Oklahoma is admitted as the 46th state.
- December 3 - Roosevelt delivers the 1907 State of the Union Address.
- December 16 - The Great White Fleet begins its voyage.

== 1908 ==
- January 11 - Roosevelt establishes the Grand Canyon as a national monument.
- June 16 - William Howard Taft is nominated as the presidential candidate of the Republican Party.
- June 30 - William Howard Taft resigns as Secretary of War to campaign for the presidency.
- July 1 - Luke Edward Wright takes office as Secretary of War.
- November 3 - William Howard Taft is elected president, defeating William Jennings Bryan.
- November 30 - Secretary of the Navy Victor H. Metcalf resigns for health reasons. He is replaced by Assistant Secretary of the Navy Truman Handy Newberry.
- December 9 - Roosevelt delivers the 1908 State of the Union Address.

== 1909 ==
- January 27 - Secretary of State Elihu Root resigns to serve as a U.S. Senator. He is replaced by Robert Bacon the same day.
- February 6 - The Second Occupation of Cuba ends with the withdrawal of American soldiers.
- March 4 - The inauguration of William Howard Taft takes place.

== See also ==
- Timeline of the William McKinley presidency, for his predecessor
- Timeline of the William Howard Taft presidency, for his successor
