= Timeline of the William McKinley presidency =

The presidency of William McKinley began on March 4, 1897, when William McKinley was inaugurated the 25th president of the United States, and it ended with McKinley's death on September 14, 1901.

== 1897 ==
- March 4 - The first inauguration of William McKinley takes place.
- April 23 - The Atoka Agreement is signed.
- July 24 - McKinley signs the Dingley Act into law.
- December 6 - McKinley delivers the 1897 State of the Union Address.
- December 16 - McKinley nominates Attorney General Joseph McKenna to the Supreme Court of the United States.

== 1898 ==
- January 21 - Attorney General Joseph McKenna is confirmed as an Associate Justice of the Supreme Court. Governor of New Jersey John W. Griggs replaces him as Attorney General.
- February 15 - The USS Maine explodes in Havana Harbor. At the time it was falsely believed that Spain was responsible.
- April 20 - McKinley signs the Teller Amendment, recognizing the terms under which the United States will go to war with Spain.
- April 21 - Postmaster General James Albert Gary resigns. He is replaced by Charles Emory Smith.
- April 21 - The United States blockades the ports of Cuba against Spain, beginning the Spanish–American War.
- April 25 - The United States officially declares war on Spain, stating that a state of war began on April 21.
- April 25 - Secretary of State John Sherman resigns for health reasons. He is replaced by Assistant Secretary of State William R. Day
- May 1 - The United States wins Battle of Manila Bay off the coast of the Philippines.
- May 12 - The United States bombards San Juan.
- June 10 - The United States wins the Battle of Guantánamo Bay and captures Guantánamo Bay.
- June 13 - McKinley signs the War Revenue Act of 1898 into law.
- June 21 - The United States captures the territory of Guam from Spain.
- June 24 - The United States wins the Battle of Las Guasimas.
- June 28 - McKinley signs the Curtis Act of 1898 into law.
- June 30 - Spain wins the Battle of Tayacoba and the First Battle of Manzanillo.
- July 1 - McKinley signs the Bankruptcy Act of 1898 into law.
- July 1 - The United States wins the Battle of San Juan Hill.
- July 3 - The United States wins the Battle of Santiago de Cuba and the Siege of Santiago begins.
- July 7 - The United States annexes Hawaii.
- July 17 - The United States wins the Siege of Santiago and takes control of Cuba.
- July 18 - The United States wins the Third Battle of Manzanillo.
- July 25 - The United States invades Puerto Rico.
- August 13 - The United States captures the Philippines and Puerto Rico. Hostilities of the Spanish–American War end.
- September 16 - Secretary of State William R. Day resigns. He is replaced by John Hay.
- October 5 - The Chippewa defeat American forces at the Battle of Sugar Point.
- December 5 - McKinley delivers the 1898 State of the Union Address.
- December 10 - The Spanish–American War officially ends with the signing of the Treaty of Paris.
- December 23 - Guam is transferred to the authority of the United States Navy.

== 1899 ==
- January 17 - The United States annexes Wake Island.
- February 4 - The Philippine–American War begins.
- February 5 - The United States wins the Battle of Manila.
- February 19 - United States Secretary of the Interior Secretary of the Interior Cornelius Newton Bliss resigns. He is replaced by Ethan A. Hitchcock
- February 24 - The United States wins the Second Battle of Caloocan.
- March 24 - George Dewey becomes the only Admiral of the Navy in American history.
- June 13 - The United States wins the Battle of Zapote River.
- September 6 - Secretary of State John Hay establishes the Open Door Policy.
- August 1 - United States Secretary of War Secretary of War Russell A. Alger is asked to resign by President McKinley. He is replaced by Elihu Root.
- November 11 - The Padre Canyon incident occurs.
- November 21 - Vice President Garret Hobart dies of heart failure at the age of 55.
- December 2 - The Battle of Tirad Pass ends inconclusively.
- December 5 - McKinley delivers the 1899 State of the Union Address.

== 1900 ==
- January 8 - McKinley transfers control of Alaska to the military.
- February 5 - The United States and the United Kingdom negotiate the construction of a Nicaragua Canal.
- March 5 - Two American cruisers are deployed to Central America amid a dispute between Costa Rica and Nicaragua.
- March 14 - McKinley signs the Gold Standard Act into law, implementing the gold standard.
- April 12 - McKinley signs the Foraker Act into law.
- April 30 - Hawaii is incorporated as a U.S. territory.
- July 12 - McKinley accepts the Republican presidential nomination.
- November 6 - McKinley is elected to a second term in the 1900 United States presidential election, defeating William Jennings Bryan for a second time.
- December 3 - McKinley delivers the 1900 State of the Union Address.

== 1901 ==
- March 2 - McKinley signs the Platt Amendment into law.
- March 4 - The second inauguration of William McKinley takes place.
- March 29 - Attorney General John W. Griggs resigns to work at the Permanent Court of Arbitration. He is replaced by Philander C. Knox.
- September 6 - McKinley is shot by Leon Czolgosz at the Pan-American Exposition.
- September 14 - McKinley dies following an infection of his injury at the age of 58. Vice President Theodore Roosevelt is inaugurated as the 26th President of the United States.

== See also ==
- Timeline of the Theodore Roosevelt presidency, for his successor
