= 1867 State of the Union Address =

Speech by US President Andrew Johnson

- Date: December 3, 1867
- Venue: House Chamber, United States Capitol
- Type: State of the Union Address
- Participants: Andrew Johnson; Benjamin Wade; Schuyler Colfax
- Format: Written
- Previous: 1866 State of the Union Address
- Next: 1868 State of the Union Address

On Tuesday, December 3, 1867, at 12:30, Col. Robert Johnson, Andrew Johnson's son and Secretary to the President of the United States, reported the President's annual message to the U.S. House of Representatives.

This annual message is notable for having included a passage that historian Eric Foner describes as "probably the most blatantly racist pronouncement ever to appear in an official state paper of an American President." The passage in question is copied below, with emphasis added to most often-quoted phrases:

The peculiar qualities which should characterize any people who are fit to decide upon the management of public affairs for a great state have seldom been combined. It is the glory of white men to know that they have had these qualities in sufficient measure to build upon this continent a great political fabric and to preserve its stability for more than ninety years, while in every other part of the world all similar experiments have failed. But if anything can be proved by known facts, if all reasoning upon evidence is not abandoned, it must be acknowledged that in the progress of nations Negroes have shown less capacity for government than any other race of people. No independent government of any form has ever been successful in their hands. On the contrary, wherever they have been left to their own devices they have shown a constant tendency to relapse into barbarism. In the Southern States, however, Congress has undertaken to confer upon them the privilege of the ballot. Just released from slavery, it may be doubted whether as a class they know more than their ancestors how to organize and regulate civil society. Indeed, it is admitted that the blacks of the South are not only regardless of the rights of property, but so utterly ignorant of public affairs that their voting can consist in nothing more than carrying a ballot to the place where they are directed to deposit it. I need not remind you that the exercise of the elective franchise is the highest attribute of an American citizen, and that when guided by virtue, intelligence, patriotism, and a proper appreciation of our free institutions it constitutes the true basis of a democratic form of government, in which the sovereign power is lodged in the body of the people.

The text had been leaked to the press early and an investigation of the leak was requested. According to one newspaper, "Outside of reconstruction there are many good things in it which will meet the hearty approbation of the country. On the latter he charges home declaring the Congressional scheme of reconstruction a failure and attended with immense expense, that the negroes being slaves one day are not fit for the exercise of suffrage the next, and twits Congress of the late elections. The President evidently feels his oats this year and is much more defiant than one year ago. Of course he will not see how he himself has stood in the way of reconstruction, and very naturally lays the blame elsewhere."

== See also ==
- History of voting rights in the United States
- Andrew Johnson and slavery
- List of State of the Union addresses

Preceded by 1866 State of the Union Address	State of the Union addresses 1867	Succeeded by 1868 State of the Union Address
