= 1866 State of the Union Address =

Speech by US President Andrew Johnson

- Date: December 3, 1866
- Venue: House Chamber, United States Capitol
- Type: State of the Union Address
- Participants: Andrew Johnson; Lafayette S. Foster; Schuyler Colfax
- Format: Written
- Previous: 1865 State of the Union Address
- Next: 1867 State of the Union Address

The 1866 State of the Union Address was given by Andrew Johnson, the 17th president of the United States, on Monday, December 3, 1866. This State of the Union was not a spoken address, but a written one. The Reconstruction Era had begun, and Johnson wanted a policy that pardoned the leaders of the Confederate States of America. He began with, "In all of the States civil authority has superseded the coercion of arms, and the people, by their voluntary action, are maintaining their governments in full activity and complete operation." In the middle, he said, "In our efforts to preserve "the unity of government which constitutes as one people" by restoring the States to the condition which they held prior to the rebellion, we should be cautious, lest, having rescued our nation from perils of threatened disintegration, we resort to consolidation, and in the end absolute despotism, as a remedy for the recurrence of similar troubles." The rebellion he is referring to is the American Civil War, which ended in 1865.

On additional domestic affairs the President mentioned the rapid construction of the transcontinental railroad, with full completion on track and completion of various treaties with Native Americans tribes that were in rebellion at the beginning of the Civil War.

On the matter of slavery the President mentioned the 13th Amendment:

The proposition to amend the Federal Constitution, so as to prevent the existence of slavery within the United States or any place subject to their jurisdiction, was ratified by the requisite number of States, and on the 18th day of December, 1865, it was officially declared to have become valid as a part of the Constitution of the United States. All of the States in which the insurrection had existed promptly amended their constitutions so as to make them conform to the great change thus effected in the organic law of the land; declared null and void all ordinances and laws of secession; repudiated all pretended debts and obligations created for the revolutionary purposes of the insurrection, and proceeded in good faith to the enactment of measures for the protection and amelioration of the condition of the colored race. Congress, however, yet hesitated to admit any of these States to representation, and it was not until toward the close of the eighth month of the session that an exception was made in favor of Tennessee by the admission of her Senators and Representatives.

The President closed with a message of hope looking towards the future:

Our Government is now undergoing its most trying ordeal, and my earnest prayer is that the peril may be successfully and finally passed without impairing its original strength and symmetry. The interests of the nation are best to be promoted by the revival of fraternal relations, the complete obliteration of our past differences, and the reinauguration of all the pursuits of peace. Directing our efforts to the early accomplishment of these great ends, let us endeavor to preserve harmony between the coordinate departments of the Government, that each in its proper sphere may cordially cooperate with the other in securing the maintenance of the Constitution, the preservation of the Union, and the perpetuity of our free institutions.

== See also ==
- List of State of the Union addresses

Preceded by 1865 State of the Union Address	State of the Union addresses 1866	Succeeded by 1867 State of the Union Address
