= 1952 State of the Union Address =

Speech by US President Harry S. Truman

- Date: January 9, 1952
- Venue: House Chamber, United States Capitol
- Location: Washington, D.C.; 38°53′23″N 77°00′32″W
- Type: State of the Union Address
- Participants: Harry S. Truman; Alben W. Barkley; Sam Rayburn
- Previous: 1951 State of the Union Address
- Next: January 1953 State of the Union Address

The 1952 State of the Union Address was given by Harry S. Truman, the 33rd president of the United States, on Wednesday, January 9, 1952. It was given to both houses of the 82nd United States Congress at the same time. In it, he said these words: "If the Soviet leaders were to accept this proposal, it would lighten the burden of armaments, and permit the resources of the earth to be devoted to the good of mankind. But until the Soviet Union accepts a sound disarmament proposal, and joins in peaceful settlements, we have no choice except to build up our defenses."

In addition, the President commented on the Korean War by saying:

The thing that is uppermost in the minds of all of us is the situation in Korea. We must, and we will, keep up the fight there until we get the kind of armistice that will put an end to the aggression and protect the safety of our forces and the security of the Republic of Korea. Beyond that we shall continue to work for a settlement in Korea that upholds the principles of the United Nations.

We went into Korea because we knew that Communist aggression had to be met firmly if freedom was to be preserved in the world. We went into the fight to save the Republic of Korea, a free country, established under the United Nations. These are our aims. We will not give up until we attain them.

Meanwhile, we must continue to strengthen the forces of freedom throughout the world.

== See also ==
- 1952 United States presidential election

Preceded by 1951 State of the Union Address	State of the Union addresses 1952	Succeeded by 1953 State of the Union Address
