= 1975 State of the Union Address =

Speech by US President Gerald Ford

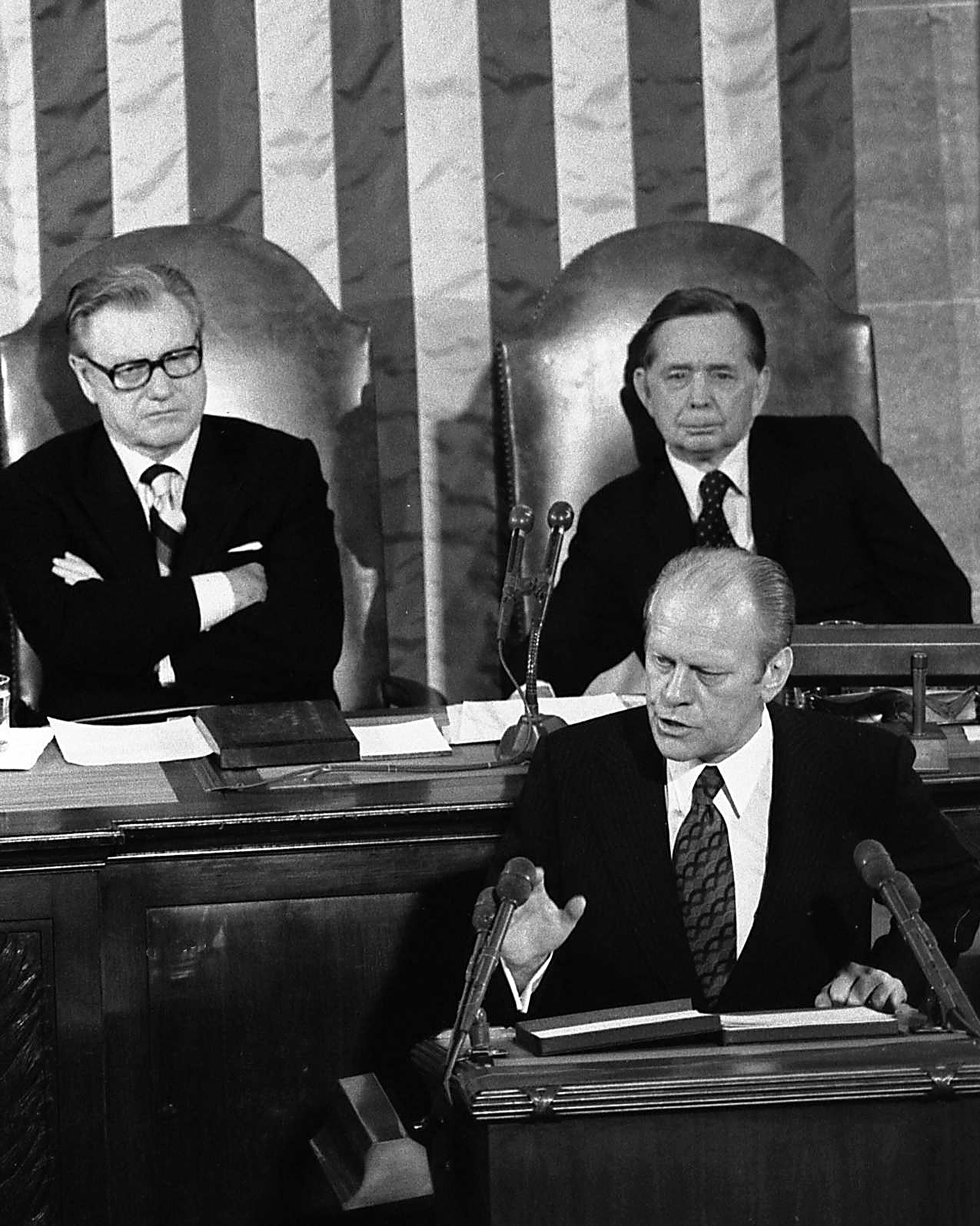
- Date: January 15, 1975
- Time: 1:00 p.m. EST
- Duration: 41 minutes
- Venue: House Chamber, United States Capitol
- Location: Washington, D.C.; 38°53′23″N 77°00′32″W
- Type: State of the Union Address
- Participants: Gerald Ford; Nelson Rockefeller; Carl Albert
- Previous: 1974 State of the Union Address
- Next: 1976 State of the Union Address

1975 State of the Union Address
Gerald Ford delivers his first State of the Union address on January 15, 1975.

The 1975 State of the Union address was given by President Gerald Ford to a joint session of the 94th United States Congress on January 15, 1975. The speech was the first State of the Union address of President Ford's tenure as president.

The president discussed the national debt, taxes, the federal budget and the energy crisis. The speech lasted 41:00 and consisted of 4,126 words. The address was broadcast live on radio and television.

The Democratic Party response was delivered by Senator Hubert Humphrey of Minnesota and the Speaker of the House Carl Albert of Oklahoma.

The President highlighted recent successes like The Berlin Agreement, SALT Agreements, and better diplomatic ties with China.

The President closed by mentioning America's bicentennial:

As our 200th anniversary approaches, we owe it to ourselves and to posterity to rebuild our political and economic strength. Let us make America once again and for centuries more to come what it has so long been--a stronghold and a beacon-light of liberty for the whole world.

The speech is remembered for Ford's opening statement, during which he said that the "state of the Union is not good".

== See also ==
- United States House of Representatives elections, 1974
- 1973–75 recession

Preceded by 1974 State of the Union Address	State of the Union addresses 1975	Succeeded by 1976 State of the Union Address
