= 1891 State of the Union Address =

Speech by US President Benjamin Harrison

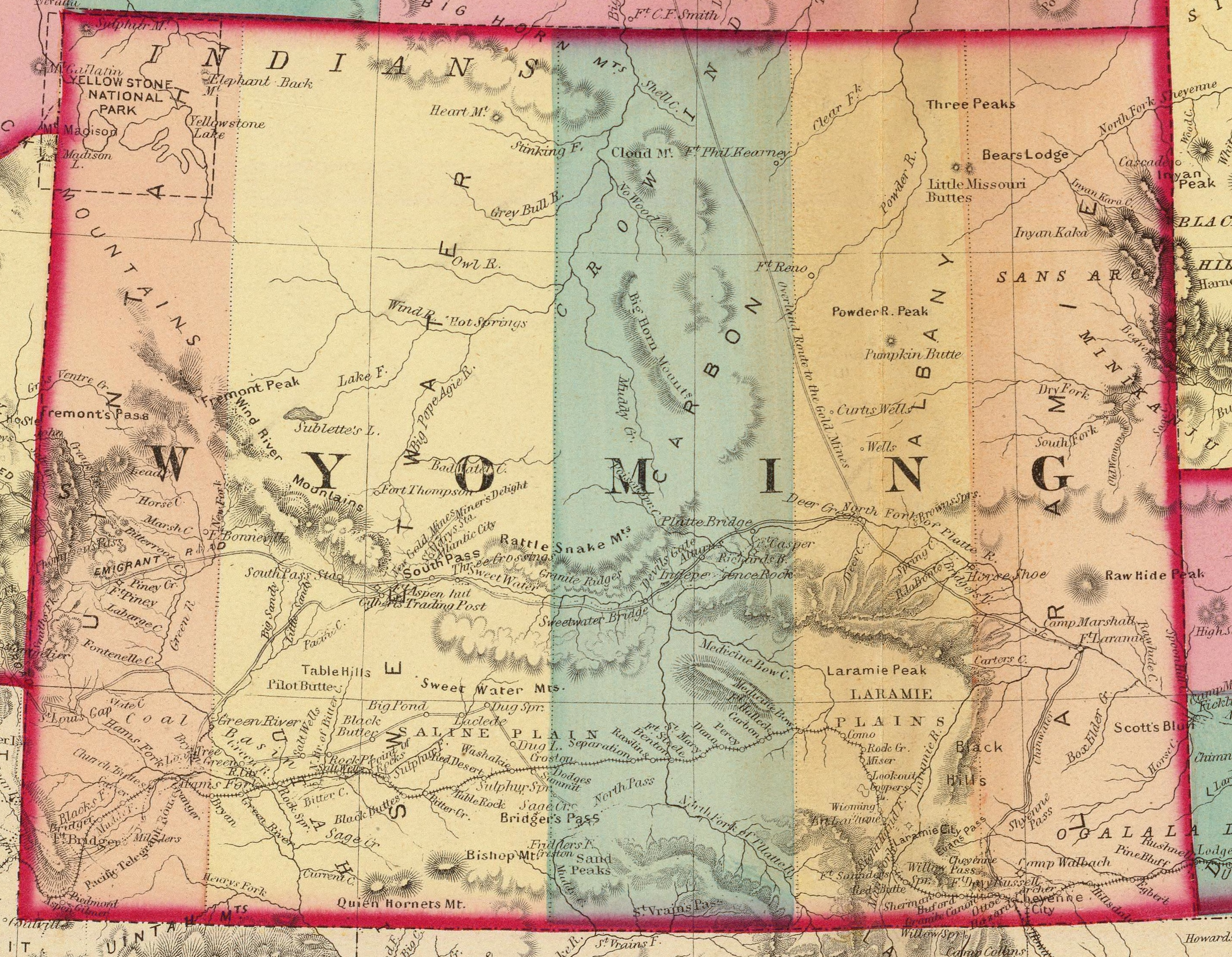
- Wyoming becomes a state in 1890, passed into law by Benjamin Harrison along with 5 other states during his single term
- Date: December 9, 1891
- Venue: House Chamber and Senate Chamber, United States Capitol
- Location: Washington, D.C.; 38°53′23″N 77°00′32″W
- Type: State of the Union Address
- Participants: Benjamin Harrison; Levi P. Morton; Charles F. Crisp
- Format: Written
- Previous: 1890 State of the Union Address
- Next: 1892 State of the Union Address

The 1891 State of the Union Address was written by Benjamin Harrison, the 23rd president of the United States. It was to both houses of the 52nd United States Congress on Wednesday, December 9, 1891, by a clerk. He said, "The vista that now opens to us is wider and more glorious than ever before. Gratification and amazement struggle for supremacy as we contemplate the population, wealth, and moral strength of our country."

In domestic matters, the President condemned the 1891 New Orleans lynchings. The President also mentions the expanded work occurring in the Bureau of Indian Affairs including the provision of school facilities for native children.

In foreign affairs, the President mentioned the Chilean Civil War and how it may impact the United States. Also mentioned is the passing of King Kalakaua in Hawaii and the desire of the Hawaiian Kingdom for more trade. The President advocated for the completion of a canal connecting the Atlantic and Pacific oceans being an issue of utmost importance.

Preceded by 1890 State of the Union Address	State of the Union addresses 1891	Succeeded by 1892 State of the Union Address
