= February 1953 State of the Union Address =

Speech by US President Dwight D. Eisenhower

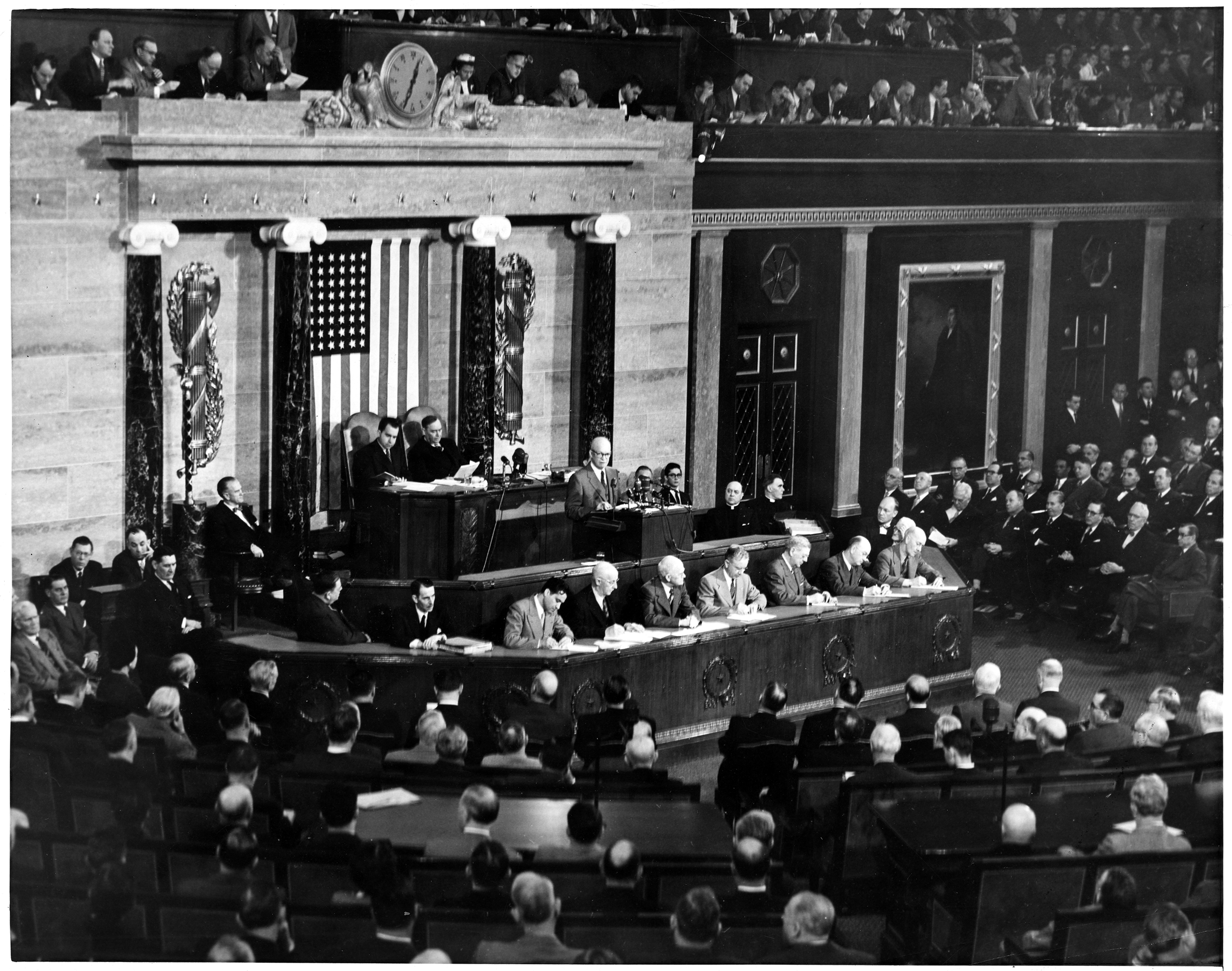
- President Dwight Eisenhower Delivers His First State of the Union Address to a Joint Session of Congress
- Date: February 2, 1953
- Time: 12:30 p.m. EST
- Duration: 56 minutes
- Venue: House Chamber, United States Capitol
- Location: Washington, D.C.; 38°53′23″N 77°00′32″W
- Type: State of the Union Address
- Participants: Dwight D. Eisenhower; Richard Nixon; Joseph W. Martin Jr.
- Previous: January 1953 State of the Union Address
- Next: 1954 State of the Union Address

The February 1953 State of the Union Address was given by Dwight D. Eisenhower, the 34th president of the United States, on Monday, February 2, 1953, to the 83rd United States Congress in the chamber of the United States House of Representatives. It was Eisenhower's first State of the Union Address. Presiding over this joint session was House speaker Joseph W. Martin Jr., accompanied by recently inaugurated Vice President Richard Nixon in his capacity as the president of the Senate. This address was broadcast live on both radio and television.

Eisenhower opened his speech by reflecting on the eight years that had elapsed since the end of World War II:

Our country has come through a painful period of trial and disillusionment since the victory of 1945. We anticipated a world of peace and cooperation. The calculated pressures of aggressive communism have forced us, instead, to live in a world of turmoil.

Eisenhower also addressed the ongoing Korean War: "In this general discussion of our foreign policy, I must make special mention of the war in Korea. This war is, for Americans, the most painful phase of Communist aggression throughout the world."

As for domestic matters, Eisenhower spent considerable time discussing the challenges posed by the national debt and the federal budget deficit and calling for the federal budget to be balanced. He urged statehood for Hawaii by 1954, though this did not occur until 1959. He also discussed civil rights issues such as desegregation in the District of Columbia and in the military:

Our civil and social rights form a central part of the heritage we are striving to defend on all fronts and with all our strength. I believe with all my heart that our vigilant guarding of these rights is a sacred obligation binding upon every citizen. To be true to one's own freedom is, in essence, to honor and respect the freedom of all others. A cardinal ideal in this heritage we cherish is the equality of rights of all citizens of every race and color and creed. We know that discrimination against minorities persists despite our allegiance to this ideal. Such discrimination—confined to no one section of the Nation—is but the outward testimony to the persistence of distrust and of fear in the hearts of men. This fact makes all the more vital the fighting of these wrongs by each individual, in every station of life, in his every deed.

This State of the Union Address was the first time that a Republican president had given a State of the Union Address in over 20 years, since Herbert Hoover's last State of the Union Address in 1932. Furthermore, it was the first time in 30 years that a Republican president had delivered a State of the Union Address before a joint session of Congress since Calvin Coolidge's first State of the Union Address in 1923.

Preceded by 1953 State of the Union Address	State of the Union addresses 1953	Succeeded by 1954 State of the Union Address
