= 1865 State of the Union Address =

Speech by US President Andrew Johnson

- Date: December 4, 1865
- Venue: House Chamber, United States Capitol
- Type: State of the Union Address
- Participants: Andrew Johnson; Lafayette S. Foster; Schuyler Colfax
- Format: Written
- Previous: 1864 State of the Union Address
- Next: 1866 State of the Union Address

The 1865 State of the Union Address was written by historian George Bancroft and read to the Congress by Robert Johnson, the son and personal secretary of the 17th president of the United States, Andrew Johnson. According to one historian, "Johnson had sent Bancroft only two suggestions: passages from Thomas Jefferson's inaugural and from a speech by Charles James Fox." The result was generally high-toned and well received.

It was presented to the United States Congress on Monday, December 4, 1865. The text stated, "Our thoughts next revert to the death of the late President by an act of parricidal treason. The grief of the nation is still fresh. It finds some solace in the consideration that he lived to enjoy the highest proof of its confidence by entering on the renewed term of the Chief Magistracy to which he had been elected; that he brought the civil war substantially to a close; that his loss was deplored in all parts of the Union, and that foreign nations have rendered justice to his memory."

Preceded by 1864 State of the Union Address	State of the Union addresses 1865	Succeeded by 1866 State of the Union Address
