= 1895 State of the Union Address =

Speech by US President Grover Cleveland

- Date: December 2, 1895
- Venue: House Chamber, United States Capitol
- Location: Washington, D.C.; 38°53′23″N 77°00′32″W
- Type: State of the Union Address
- Participants: Grover Cleveland; Adlai Stevenson; Thomas B. Reed
- Format: Written
- Previous: 1894 State of the Union Address
- Next: 1896 State of the Union Address

The 1895 State of the Union Address was written by Grover Cleveland. It was presented on Monday, December 2, 1895, to both houses of the 54th United States Congress. He said, "Although but one American citizen was reported to have been actually wounded, and although the destruction of property may have fallen more heavily upon the missionaries of other nationalities than our own, it plainly behooved this Government to take the most prompt and decided action to guard against similar or perhaps more dreadful calamities befalling the hundreds of American mission stations which have grown up throughout the interior of China under the temperate rule of toleration, custom, and imperial edict.

In foreign policy, the President mentions the end of the First Sino-Japanese War and the importance of the new government in China to guard the various American mission stations in China. Additionally, the President mentions the opening of the new Kiel Canal in Germany, in the presence of the US Navy.

A large portion of the address is dedicated to monetary policy, the President supported the gold standard.

Preceded by 1894 State of the Union Address	State of the Union addresses 1895	Succeeded by 1896 State of the Union Address
