= 1951 State of the Union Address =

Speech by US President Harry S. Truman

- Date: January 8, 1951
- Time: 1:00 p.m. EST
- Venue: House Chamber, United States Capitol
- Location: Washington, D.C.; 38°53′23″N 77°00′32″W
- Type: State of the Union Address
- Participants: Harry S. Truman; Alben W. Barkley; Sam Rayburn
- Previous: 1950 State of the Union Address
- Next: 1952 State of the Union Address

The 1951 State of the Union Address was given by Harry S. Truman, the 33rd president of the United States, on Monday, January 8, 1951, to the 82nd United States Congress in the chamber of the United States House of Representatives. It was Truman's sixth State of the Union Address. Presiding over this joint session was House speaker Sam Rayburn, accompanied by Vice President Alben W. Barkley in his capacity as the president of the Senate.

Truman began his speech by discussing the ongoing Korean War:

As we meet here today, American soldiers are fighting a bitter campaign in Korea. We pay tribute to their courage, devotion, and gallantry. Our men are fighting, alongside their United Nations allies, because they know, as we do, that the aggression in Korea is part of the attempt of the Russian Communist dictatorship to take over the world, step by step. Our men are fighting a long way from home, but they are fighting for our lives and our liberties. They are fighting to protect our right to meet here today—our right to govern ourselves as a free nation.

After delivering a speech largely devoted to foreign policy, Truman concluded his message with these words:

Peace is precious to us. It is the way of life we strive for with all the strength and wisdom we possess. But more precious than peace are freedom and justice. We will fight, if fight we must, to keep our freedom and to prevent justice from being destroyed. These are the things that give meaning to our lives, and which we acknowledge to be greater than ourselves. This is our cause—peace, freedom, justice. We will pursue this cause with determination and humility, asking divine guidance that in all we do we may follow the will of God.

This State of the Union saw a record-level of security personnel as soldiers with fixed bayonets surrounded the United States Capitol while Truman was speaking, and members of Congress were asked for identification in order to enter the premises.

Republican Senator Robert A. Taft effectively gave a response to Truman's State of the Union Address during a speech to the National Press Club. Taft accused Truman of giving only "yes or no" choices on foreign policy.

| Preceded by 1950 State of the Union Address | State of the Union addresses 1951 | Succeeded by 1952 State of the Union Address |
