= 1974 State of the Union Address =

Speech by US President Richard Nixon

- Date: January 30, 1974
- Time: 9:00 p.m. EST
- Duration: 43 minutes
- Venue: House Chamber, United States Capitol
- Location: Washington, D.C.; 38°53′23″N 77°00′32″W
- Type: State of the Union Address
- Participants: Richard Nixon; Gerald Ford; Carl Albert
- Previous: 1973 State of the Union Address
- Next: 1975 State of the Union Address

The 1974 State of the Union Address was given to the 93rd United States Congress, on Wednesday, January 30, 1974, by Richard Nixon, the 37th president of the United States.

We meet here tonight at a time of great challenge and great opportunities for America. We meet at a time when we face great problems at home and abroad that will test the strength of our fiber as a nation. But we also meet at a time when that fiber has been tested, and it has proved strong.
America is a great and good land, and we are a great and good land because we are a strong, free, creative people and because America is the single greatest force for peace anywhere in the world. Today, as always in our history, we can base our confidence in what the American people will achieve in the future on the record of what the American people have achieved in the past.

— Nixon's 1974 SOTU address

It was given in the same year America withdrew all assistance from South Vietnam during the Vietnam War. Nixon also called for the end of the Watergate investigations. He resigned months later due to the investigations.

Preceded by 1973 State of the Union Address	State of the Union addresses 1974	Succeeded by 1975 State of the Union Address
