= 1923 State of the Union Address =

Speech by US President Calvin Coolidge

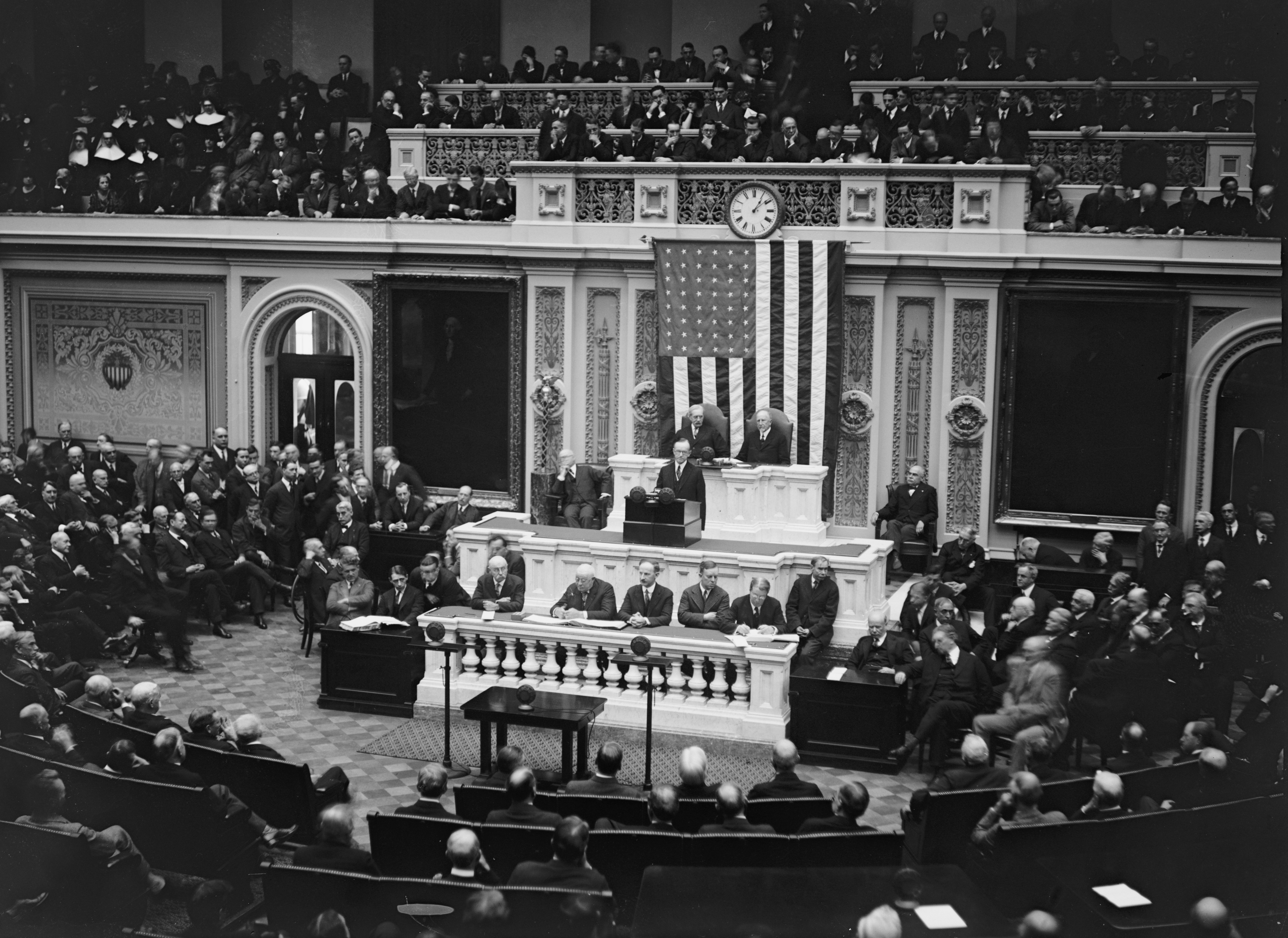
- Coolidge speaking during his address
- Date: December 6, 1923
- Venue: House Chamber, United States Capitol
- Location: Washington, D.C.; 38°53′23″N 77°00′32″W
- Type: State of the Union Address
- Participants: Calvin Coolidge; Albert B. Cummins; Frederick H. Gillett
- Previous: 1922 State of the Union Address
- Next: 1924 State of the Union Address

The 1923 State of the Union Address was given by Calvin Coolidge, the 30th president of the United States, on Thursday, December 6, 1923, to the 68th United States Congress in the chamber of the United States House of Representatives. It was Coolidge's first State of the Union Address and his first speech to a joint session of the United States Congress after assuming the presidency upon the death of Warren G. Harding four months earlier in 1923. Presiding over this joint session was House speaker Frederick H. Gillett, accompanied by Senate president pro tempore Albert B. Cummins, .

== Speech ==
Coolidge opened his speech by paying tribute to recently deceased President Warren G. Harding:

Since the close of the last Congress the Nation has lost President Harding. The world knew his kindness and his humanity, his greatness and his character. He has left his mark upon history. He has made justice more certain and peace more secure. The surpassing tribute paid to his memory as he was borne across the continent to rest at last at home revealed the place lie held in the hearts of the American people.

Amongst the many issues facing the country that Coolidge addressed, his opposition to the practice of lynching is notable:

Numbered among our population are some 12,000,000 colored people. Under our Constitution their rights are just as sacred as those of any other citizen. It is both a public and a private duty to protect those rights. The Congress ought to exercise all its powers of prevention and punishment against the hideous crime of lynching, of which the negroes are by no means the sole sufferers, but for which they furnish a majority of the victims.

Coolidge closed his speech with a reflection on the emergence of the United States as a world power in the post-World War I era, in which he alluded to a line from Abraham Lincoln's Cooper Union speech:

The world has had enough of the curse of hatred and selfishness, of destruction and war. It has had enough of the wrongful use of material power. For the healing of the nations there must be good will and charity, confidence and peace. The time has come for a more practical use of moral power, and more reliance upon the principle that right makes its own might. Our authority among the nations must be represented by justice and mercy. It is necessary not only to have faith, but to make sacrifices for our faith. The spiritual forces of the world make all its final determinations. It is with these voices that America should speak. Whenever they declare a righteous purpose there need be no doubt that they will be heard. America has taken her place in the world as a Republic—free, independent, powerful. The best service that can be rendered to humanity is the assurance that this place will be maintained.

This was the only State of the Union Address which Coolidge delivered as a speech. After 1923, Coolidge opted to restore the longstanding practice of delivering the State of the Union Address in writing. By word count, this address was Coolidge's shortest State of the Union Address, consisting of 6,706 words.

This was the first State of the Union Address to be broadcast to a large radio audience, following a limited but successful experimentation with radio the year prior.

This speech was the last time that a Republican president would address a joint session of Congress to deliver a State of the Union Address until 30 years later, when Dwight D. Eisenhower gave his first State of the Union Address in 1953.

Preceded by 1922 State of the Union Address	State of the Union addresses 1923	Succeeded by 1924 State of the Union Address
