= 1971 State of the Union Address =

Speech by US President Richard Nixon

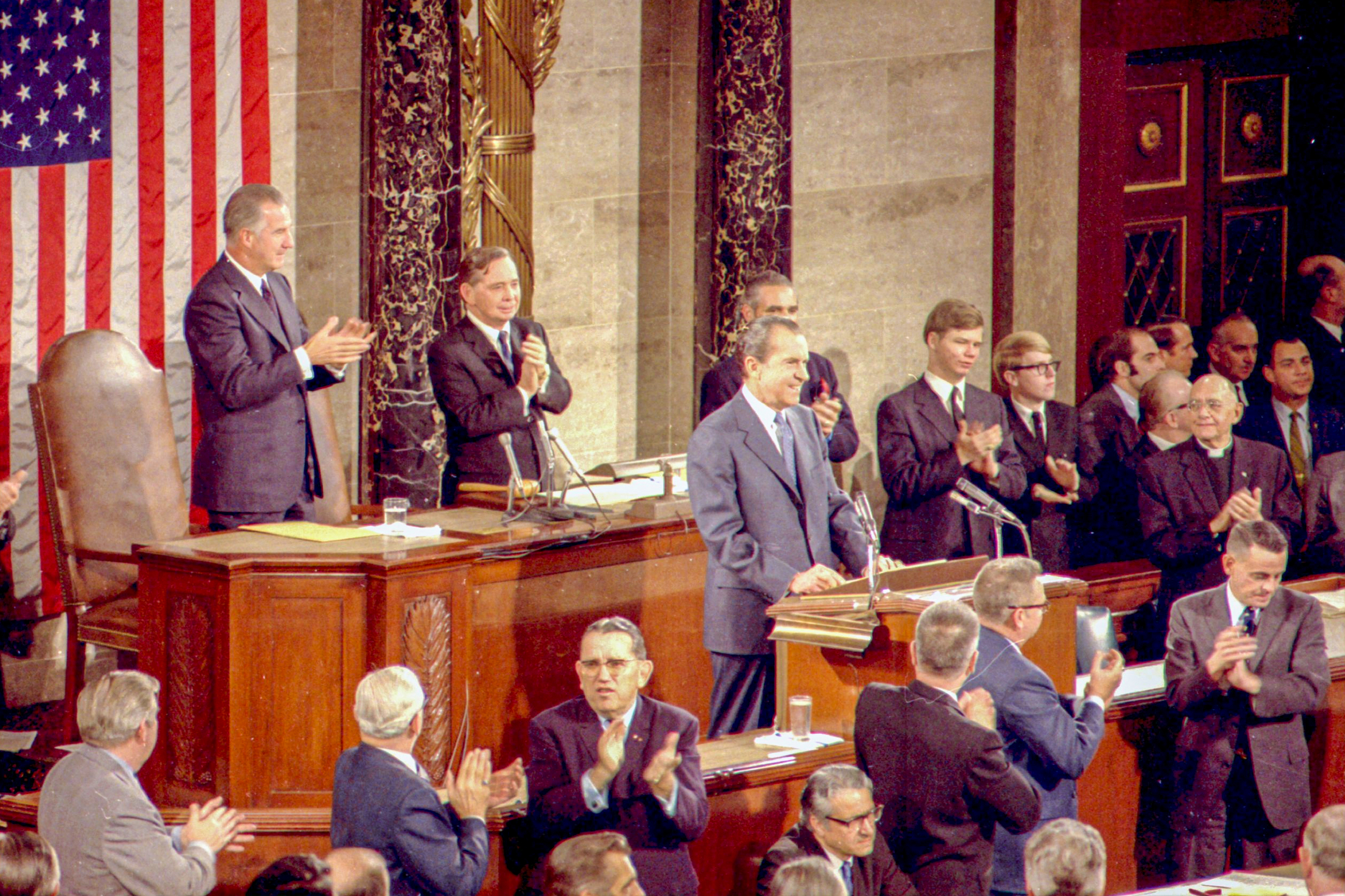
- Date: January 22, 1971
- Time: 9:00 p.m. EST
- Duration: 33 minutes
- Venue: House Chamber, United States Capitol
- Location: Washington, D.C.; 38°53′23″N 77°00′32″W
- Type: State of the Union Address
- Participants: Richard Nixon; Spiro Agnew; Carl Albert
- Previous: 1970 State of the Union Address
- Next: 1972 State of the Union Address

The 1971 State of the Union Address was given by U.S. President Richard Nixon on January 22, 1971.

== Topics ==
At the very start of the address, Nixon mourned the death of Senator Richard Russell Jr.

The address was known for introducing Nixon's "six great goals", which would go on to be reiterated in the 1972 State of the Union Address:

1. Welfare reform, particularly with the proposed Family Assistance Plan
2. Peacetime prosperity, and stimulating the economy
3. Restoring the natural environment, particularly with the National Environmental Policy Act
4. Expanding health care (which Nixon would later go on to fulfill with the Health Maintenance Organization Act of 1973 and the December 1971 National Cancer Act)
5. Revenue sharing with state and local governments (later accomplished with the 1972 General Revenue Sharing Bill, which became the State and Local Fiscal Assistance Act of 1972)
6. Reorganize the federal government (this would have reduced 12 of the departments down to 8 had it happened, though it did not).

Notably, the 1971 State of the Union did not touch upon foreign policy.

== Response ==
On January 26, 1971, Senator Mike Mansfield (D-MT), then the Senate Majority Leader, responded to the address in an interview with four network correspondents.

Preceded by 1970 State of the Union Address	State of the Union addresses 1971	Succeeded by 1972 State of the Union Address
