= 1950 State of the Union Address =

Speech by US President Harry S. Truman

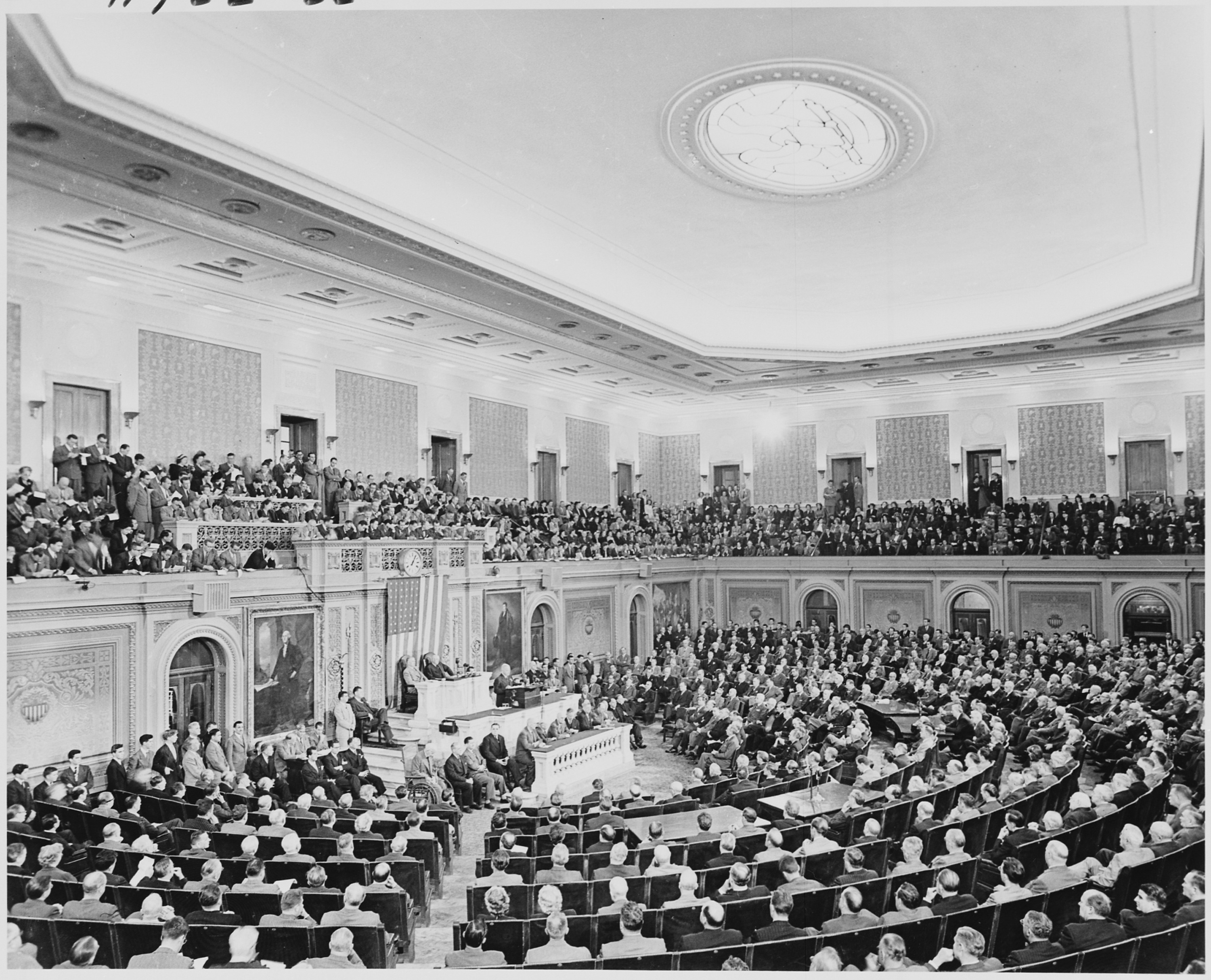
- Photograph of President Truman delivering his State of the Union address to a joint session of Congress.
- Date: January 4, 1950
- Time: 1:00 p.m. EST
- Venue: House Chamber, United States Capitol
- Location: Washington, D.C.; 38°53′23″N 77°00′32″W
- Type: State of the Union Address
- Participants: Harry S. Truman; Alben W. Barkley; Sam Rayburn
- Previous: 1949 State of the Union Address
- Next: 1951 State of the Union Address

The 1950 State of the Union Address was given by Harry S. Truman, the 33rd president of the United States, on Wednesday, January 4, 1950. He spoke to the 81st United States Congress, to the United States House of Representatives and the United States Senate. It was a joint session, and the 160th address given. He said, "Our aim for a peaceful, democratic world of free peoples will be achieved in the long run, not by force of arms, but by an appeal to the minds and hearts of men." He also said, Our Social Security System should be developed into the main reliance of our people for basic protection against the economic hazards of old-age, unemployment, and illness.

In speaking about his most important recommendations the President said:

As we go forward in achieving greater economic security and greater opportunity for all our people, we should make every effort to extend the benefits of our democratic institutions to every citizen. The religious ideals which we profess, and the heritage of freedom which we have received from the past, clearly place that duty upon us. I again urge the Congress to enact the civil rights proposals I made in February 1948. These proposals are for the enactment of Federal statutes which will protect all our people in the exercise of their democratic rights and their search for economic opportunity, grant statehood to Alaska and Hawaii, provide a greater measure of self-government for our island possessions, and accord home rule to the District of Columbia. Some of those proposals have been before the Congress for a long time. Those who oppose them, as well as those who favor them, should recognize that it is the duty of the elected representatives of the people to let these proposals come to a vote.

== See also ==
- United States House of Representatives elections, 1950

Preceded by 1949 State of the Union Address	State of the Union addresses 1950	Succeeded by 1951 State of the Union Address
