= 1977 State of the Union Address =

Speech by US President Gerald R. Ford

- Date: January 12, 1977
- Time: 9:00 p.m. EST
- Duration: 45 minutes
- Venue: House Chamber, United States Capitol
- Location: Washington, D.C.; 38°53′23″N 77°00′32″W
- Type: State of the Union Address
- Participants: Gerald Ford; Nelson Rockefeller; Tip O'Neill
- Previous: 1976 State of the Union Address
- Next: 1978 State of the Union Address

The 1977 State of the Union address was given by President Gerald R. Ford to a joint session of the 95th United States Congress on Wednesday, January 12, 1977. Presiding over this joint session was the House speaker, Tip O'Neill, accompanied by Nelson Rockefeller, the vice president, in his capacity as the president of the Senate.

The speech lasted 44 minutes and 55 seconds and contained 4,727 words. In the speech, President Ford discussed the Vietnam War, national defense, and fiscal policy issues.

The President advocated for peace through strength by saying:

America's first goal is and always will be peace with honor. America must remain first in keeping peace in the world. We can remain first in peace only if we are never second in defense.

As of 2026, this State of the Union address was the last one delivered as a spoken speech to a joint session of Congress by a president in January of the same year in which he left office. Thus, Gerald Ford is the last president to have given a State of the Union address as a speech in the same year in which he left office.

== See also ==
- 1976 United States presidential election

Preceded by 1976 State of the Union Address	State of the Union addresses 1977	Succeeded by 1978 State of the Union Address
