= January 1953 State of the Union Address =

Speech by US President Harry S. Truman

- Date: January 7, 1953
- Venue: House Chamber and Senate Chamber, United States Capitol
- Location: Washington, D.C.
- Type: State of the Union Address
- Participants: Harry S. Truman; Alben W. Barkley; Sam Rayburn
- Format: Written
- Previous: 1952 State of the Union Address
- Next: February 1953 State of the Union Address

The January 1953 State of the Union Address was delivered by Harry S. Truman, the 33rd president of the United States, on Wednesday, January 7, 1953, to both houses of the 83rd United States Congress in written format. Truman did not deliver this as a speech before a joint session of Congress. The written address consisted of 9,683 words.

This speech functioned effectively as a farewell address for Truman since, instead of proposing legislation for the Congress to consider, Truman reflected on the past accomplishments of his administration:

The presentation of a legislative program falls properly to my successor, not to me, and I would not infringe upon his responsibility to chart the forward course. Instead, I wish to speak of the course we have been following the past eight years and the position at which we have arrived.

Notably, the President reflected back on World War 2, the development of chemical weaponry and the atomic age. He noted the significant accomplishments of the country since the end of the war, by saying:

Our economy has grown tremendously. Free enterprise has flourished as never fore. Sixty-two million people are now gainfully employed, compared with 51 million seven years ago. Private businessmen and farmers have invested more than 200 billion dollars in new plant and equipment since the end of World War II. Prices have risen further than they should have done--but incomes, by and large, have risen even more, so that real living standards are now considerably higher than seven years ago. Aided by sound government policies, our expanding economy has shown the strength and flexibility for swift and almost painless reconversion from war to peace, in 1945 and 1946; for quick reaction and recovery-- well before Korea--from the beginnings of recession in 1949. Above all, this live and vital economy of ours has now shown the remarkable capacity to sustain a great mobilization program for defense, a vast outpouring of aid to friends and allies all around the world--and still to produce more goods and services for peaceful use at home than we have ever known before.

== See also ==
- 1952 United States presidential election

| Preceded by 1952 State of the Union Address | State of the Union addresses 1953 | Succeeded by 1953 State of the Union Address |
