= 1893 State of the Union Address =

Speech by US President Grover Cleveland

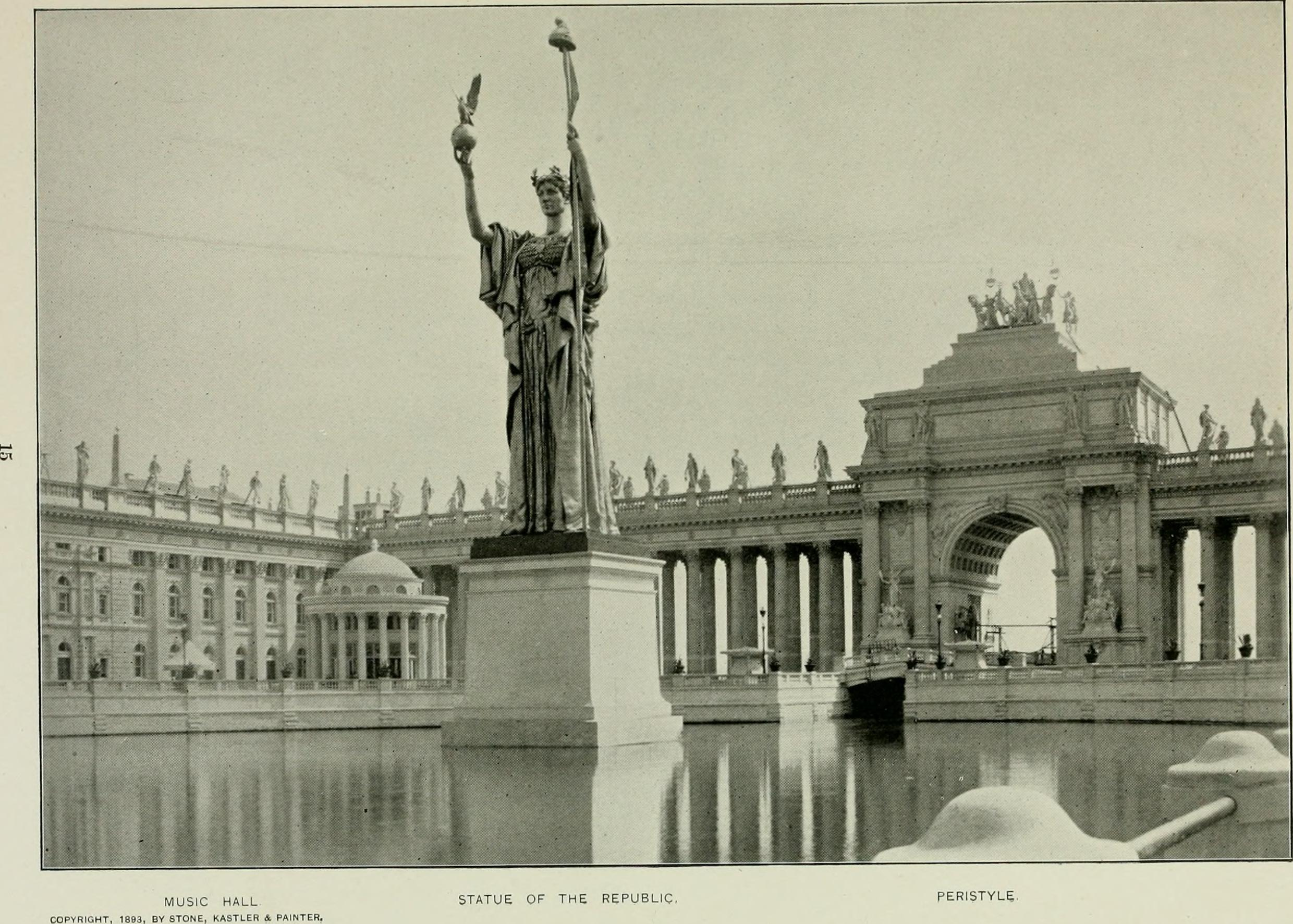
- Cleveland opened the historic Columbian exposition in Chicago, 1893
- Date: December 4, 1893
- Venue: House Chamber, United States Capitol
- Location: Washington, D.C.; 38°53′23″N 77°00′32″W
- Type: State of the Union Address
- Participants: Grover Cleveland; Adlai Stevenson; Charles F. Crisp
- Format: Written
- Previous: 1892 State of the Union Address
- Next: 1894 State of the Union Address

The 1893 State of the Union Address was written on Monday, December 4, 1893, by Grover Cleveland, the 24th United States president, to both houses of the 53rd United States Congress. It was his fifth address, and his fifth year in office. He said, "It is believed that under the recent amendment of the act extending the time for registration the Chinese laborers thereto entitled who desire to reside in this country will now avail themselves of the renewed privilege thus afforded of establishing by lawful procedure their right to remain, and that thereby the necessity of enforced deportation may to a great degree be avoided."

== Perpetual government ==
"Beneath all the vagaries and sublimated theories which are attracted to it there underlies this reform a sturdy common-sense principle not only suited to this mundane sphere, but whose application our people are more and more recognizing to be absolutely essential to the most successful operation of their Government, if not to its perpetuity."

== Conclusion ==
"In conclusion my intense feeling of responsibility impels me to invoke for the manifold interests of a generous and confiding people the most scrupulous care and to pledge my willing support to every legislative effort for the advancement of the greatness and prosperity of our beloved country."

Preceded by 1892 State of the Union Address	State of the Union addresses 1893	Succeeded by 1894 State of the Union Address
