= 1973 State of the Union Address =

Speech by US President Richard Nixon

- Date: February 2 – March 14, 1973
- Venue: House Chamber and Senate Chamber, United States Capitol
- Location: Washington, D.C.
- Type: State of the Union Address
- Participants: Richard Nixon
- Format: Written
- Previous: 1972 State of the Union Address
- Next: 1974 State of the Union Address

The 1973 State of the Union Address was delivered to the 93rd United States Congress as a series of six written messages from February 2 to March 14, 1973. The first message was an overview, which was then followed by five additional messages, each of which focused on a specific public policy theme.

In the initial introductory message, Nixon wrote:

America continues to provide a better and more abundant life for more of its people than any other nation in the world. We have passed through one of the most difficult periods in our history without surrendering to despair and without dishonoring our ideals as a people.

Looking back, there is a lesson in all this for all of us. The lesson is one that we sometimes had to learn the hard way over the past few years. But we did learn it. That lesson is that even potentially destructive forces can be converted into positive forces when we know how to channel them, and when we use common sense and common decency to create a climate of mutual respect and goodwill.

By working together and harnessing the forces of nature, Americans have unlocked some of the great mysteries of the universe.

== Six messages ==
#	Date	Title	Source
1	February 2, 1973	Overview and Goals	
2	February 15, 1973	Natural Resources and the Environment	
3	February 22, 1973	The Economy	
4	March 1, 1973	Human Resources	
5	March 8, 1973	Community Development	
6	March 14, 1973	Law Enforcement and Drug Abuse Prevention	

Preceded by 1972 State of the Union Address	State of the Union addresses 1973	Succeeded by 1974 State of the Union Address
