= 1972 State of the Union Address =

Speech by US President Richard Nixon

- Date: January 20, 1972
- Time: 12:30 p.m. EST
- Duration: 29 minutes
- Venue: House Chamber, United States Capitol
- Location: Washington, D.C.; 38°53′23″N 77°00′32″W
- Type: State of the Union Address
- Participants: Richard Nixon; Spiro Agnew; Carl Albert
- Previous: 1971 State of the Union Address
- Next: 1973 State of the Union Address

The 1972 State of the Union Address was a State of the Union address given by U.S. President Richard Nixon on January 20, 1972. The shortest such recorded address in history, it covered value-added taxes, emergency medicine, and the then-ongoing Vietnam War.

== Topics ==
In the address, Nixon proposed a value-added tax of 3% on retail sales. He also discussed deficiencies in the country's emergency medical services, advising the U.S. Department of Health, Education & Welfare to reorganize such services. With respect to the Vietnam War, the president declared that "As our involvement with the war in Vietnam comes to an end, we must go on to build a generation of peace". (The war actually ended with the Fall of Saigon in 1975, three years later, making the president's declaration read as premature in retrospect.)

The address continued six great goals from the 1971 State of the Union Address, but with various other items added to appease interest groups. (These goals were: welfare reform, peacetime prosperity, restoring the natural environment, improving healthcare, revenue sharing, and reorganizing the U.S. federal government.)

== Event ==
The address ended up being the shortest-ever recorded State of the Union address in history. It lasted for only 28 minutes and 55 seconds.

On January 21, Democratic Congresspeople recorded an official response to the address in a 53-minute televised panel.

Preceded by 1971 State of the Union Address	State of the Union addresses 1972	Succeeded by 1973 State of the Union Address
