= 1976 State of the Union Address =

Speech by US President Gerald Ford

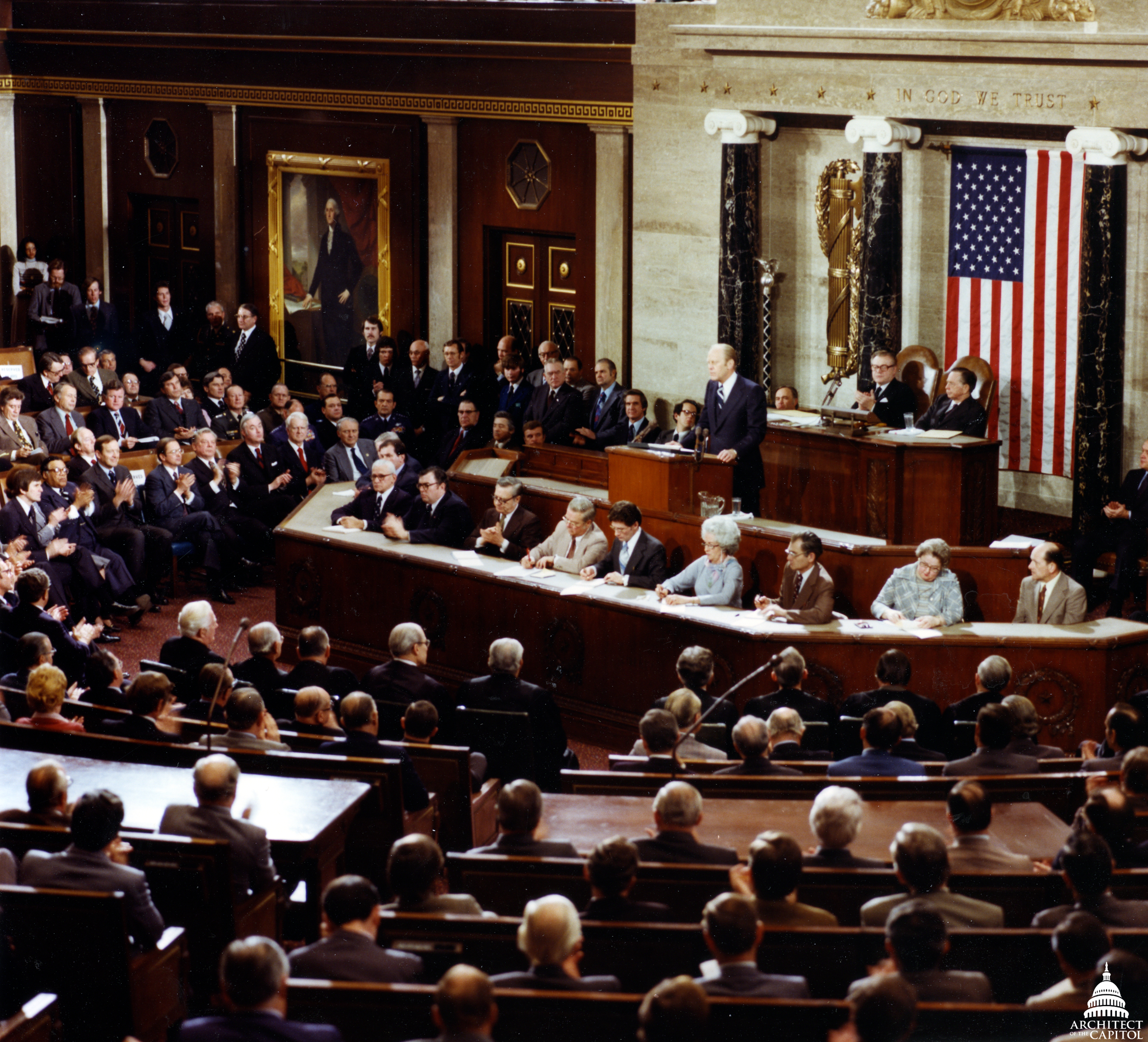
- Date: January 19, 1976
- Time: 9:00 p.m. EST
- Duration: 51 minutes
- Venue: House Chamber, United States Capitol
- Location: Washington, D.C.; 38°53′23″N 77°00′32″W
- Type: State of the Union Address
- Participants: Gerald Ford; Nelson Rockefeller; Carl Albert
- Previous: 1975 State of the Union Address
- Next: 1977 State of the Union Address

The 1976 State of the Union address was given by President Gerald R. Ford to a joint session of the 94th United States Congress on Monday, January 19, 1976.

The speech lasted 50 minutes and 38 seconds. and contained 4948 words.

1976 marked the United States bicentennial, the President remarked on the accomplishment of the country reaching this point.

The President closed by saying:

I have heard many inspiring Presidential speeches, but the words I remember best were spoken by Dwight D. Eisenhower. "America is not good because' it is great," the President said. "America is great because it is good."

President Eisenhower was raised in a poor but religious home in the heart of America. His simple words echoed President Lincoln's eloquent testament that "right makes might." And Lincoln in turn evoked the silent image of George Washington kneeling in prayer at Valley Forge.

So, all these magic memories which link eight generations of Americans are summed up in the inscription just above me. How many times have we seen it? "In God We Trust."

Let us engrave it now in each of our hearts as we begin our Bicentennial.

== See also ==
- 1976 United States presidential election

Preceded by 1975 State of the Union Address	State of the Union addresses 1976	Succeeded by 1977 State of the Union Address
