= 1903 State of the Union Address =

Speech by US President Theodore Roosevelt

- Date: December 7, 1903
- Venue: House Chamber, United States Capitol
- Location: Washington, D.C.; 38°53′23″N 77°00′32″W
- Type: State of the Union Address
- Participants: Theodore Roosevelt; William P. Frye; Joseph G. Cannon
- Previous: 1902 State of the Union Address
- Next: 1904 State of the Union Address

The 1903 State of the Union Address was submitted on Monday, December 7, 1903, by the 26th president of the United States, Theodore Roosevelt, to both houses of the 58th United States Congress.

Concerning immigration to the United States, Roosevelt commented, "We can not have too much immigration of the right kind, and we should have none at all of the wrong kind." Discussing the problem of public corruption, Roosevelt wrote, "There can be no crime more serious than bribery. Other offenses violate one law while corruption strikes at the foundation of all law." Roosevelt described the October 1903 resolution of the Alaska boundary dispute as "satisfactory in every way." Referring approvingly to the submission of the issues of the Venezuelan crisis of 1902–1903 to the Permanent Court of Arbitration in The Hague, Roosevelt wrote, "There seems good ground for the belief that there has been a real growth among the civilized nations of a sentiment which will permit a gradual substitution of other methods than the method of war in the settlement of disputes."

Of the District of Alaska, Roosevelt wrote, "Alaska is situated in the far north; but so are Norway and Sweden and Finland; and Alaska can prosper and play its part in the New World just as those nations have prospered and played their parts in the Old World." Roosevelt also stated, "I recommend that an appropriation be made for building light-houses in Hawaii, and taking possession of those already built. The Territory should be reimbursed for whatever amounts it has already expended for light-houses." Concerning the Philippines, Roosevelt said, "No one people ever benefited another people more than we have benefited the Filipinos by taking possession of the islands." Commending the work of the Bureau of Pensions on pension claims, Roosevelt wrote, "No other class of our citizens deserves so well of the Nation as those to whom the Nation owes its very being, the veterans of the civil war."

In the final part of the address, Roosevelt discussed at length the November 1903 separation of Panama from Colombia and the importance of building a Panama Canal. Roosevelt stated, "For four hundred years, ever since shortly after the discovery of this hemisphere, the canal across the Isthmus has been planned. For two score years it has been worked at. When made it is to last for the ages. It is to alter the geography of a continent and the trade routes of the world... At last the right to begin this great undertaking is made available. Panama has done her part. All that remains is for the American Congress to do its part, and forthwith this Republic will enter upon the execution of a project colossal in its size and of well-nigh incalculable possibilities for the good of this country and the nations of mankind."

Preceded by 1902 State of the Union Address	State of the Union addresses 1903	Succeeded by 1904 State of the Union Address
