= 1906 State of the Union Address =

Speech by US President Theodore Roosevelt

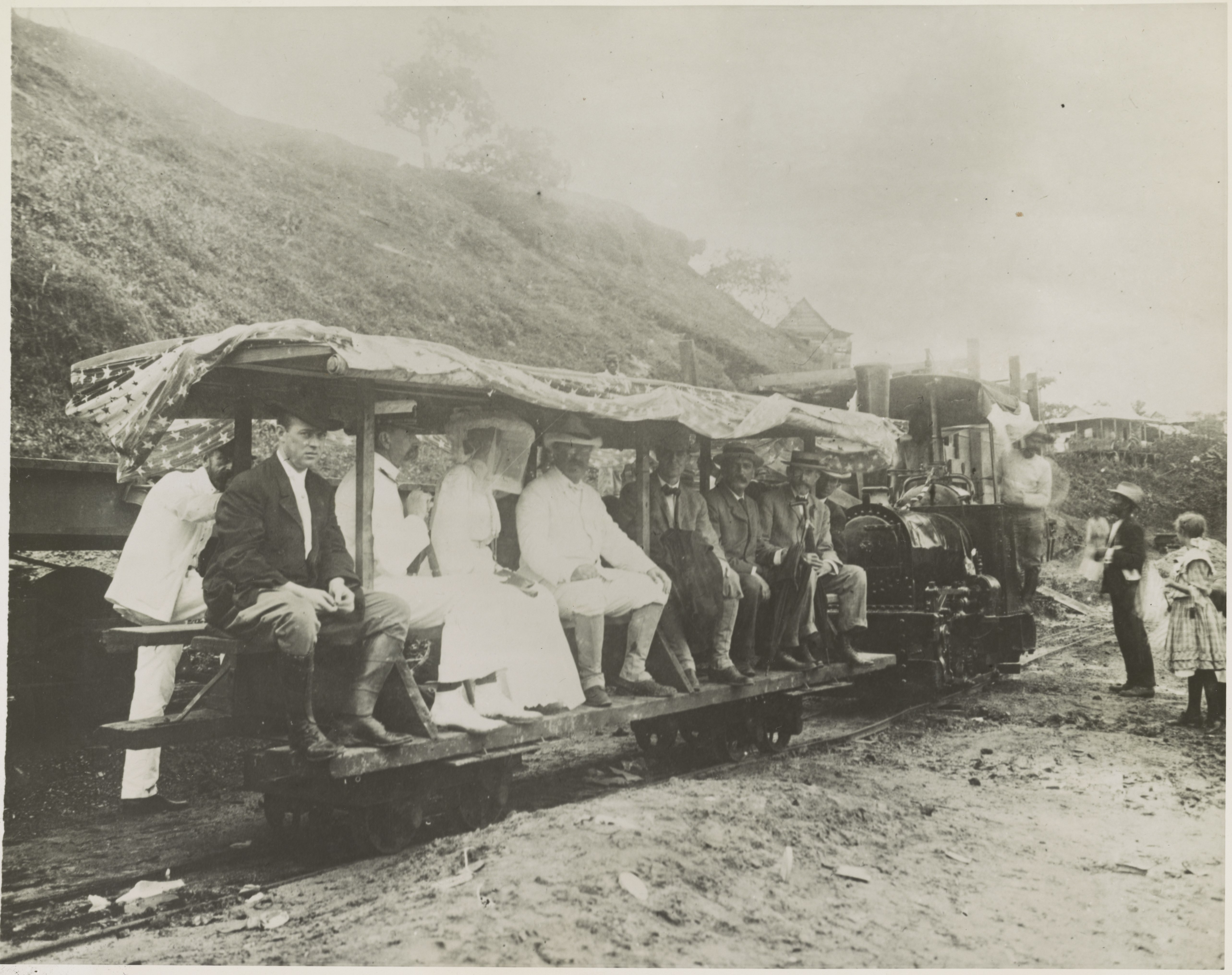
- When President Theodore Roosevelt visited Panama Canal in 1906
- Date: December 3, 1906
- Venue: House Chamber, United States Capitol
- Location: Washington, D.C.; 38°53′23″N 77°00′32″W
- Type: State of the Union Address
- Participants: Theodore Roosevelt; Charles W. Fairbanks; Joseph G. Cannon
- Format: Written
- Previous: 1905 State of the Union Address
- Next: 1907 State of the Union Address

The 1906 State of the Union Address was written by Theodore Roosevelt, the 26th president of the United States, on Monday, December 3, 1906. He did not speak directly to the 59th United States Congress. He said, "The readiness and efficiency of both the Army and Navy in dealing with the recent sudden crisis in Cuba illustrate afresh their value to the Nation. This readiness and efficiency would have been very much less had it not been for the existence of the General Staff in the Army and the General Board in the Navy; both are essential to the proper development and use of our military forces afloat and ashore."

In domestic matters, the President spoke about the importance of education:

No more shortsighted policy can be imagined than, in the fancied interest of one class, to prevent the education of another class. The free public school, the chance for each boy or girl to get a good elementary education, lies at the foundation of our whole political situation. In every community the poorest citizens, those who need the schools most, would be deprived of them if they only received school facilities proportioned to the taxes they paid. This is as true of one portion of our country as of another.

On foreign affairs, the President spoke about his vision for America's role in the Pacific:

Our nation fronts on the Pacific, just as it fronts on the Atlantic. We hope to play a constantly growing part in the great ocean of the Orient. We wish, as we ought to wish, for a great commercial development in our dealings with Asia; and it is out of the question that we should permanently have such development unless we freely and gladly extend to other nations the same measure of justice and good treatment which we expect to receive in return. It is only a very small body of our citizens that act badly. Where the Federal Government has power it will deal summarily with any such. Where the several States have power I earnestly ask that they also deal wisely and promptly with such conduct, or else this small body of wrongdoers may bring shame upon the great mass of their innocent and right-thinking fellows—that is, upon our nation as a whole. Good manners should be an international no less than an individual attribute. I ask fair treatment for the Japanese as I would ask fair treatment for Germans or Englishmen, Frenchmen, Russians, or Italians. I ask it as due to humanity and civilization. I ask it as due to ourselves because we must act uprightly toward all men.

Preceded by 1905 State of the Union Address	State of the Union addresses 1906	Succeeded by 1907 State of the Union Address
