= 1908 State of the Union Address =

Speech by US President Theodore Roosevelt

- Date: December 8, 1908
- Venue: House Chamber, United States Capitol
- Location: Washington, D.C.; 38°53′23″N 77°00′32″W
- Type: State of the Union Address
- Participants: Theodore Roosevelt; Charles W. Fairbanks; Joseph G. Cannon
- Format: Written
- Previous: 1907 State of the Union Address
- Next: 1909 State of the Union Address

The 1908 State of the Union Address was written on Tuesday, December 8, 1908, by Theodore Roosevelt, the 26th president of the United States. He did not speak directly to the 60th United States Congress, as the tradition did not start until 1913. He said about the navy, "I approve the recommendations of the General Board for the increase of the Navy, calling especial attention to the need of additional destroyers and colliers, and above all, of the four battleships. It is desirable to complete as soon as possible a squadron of eight battleships of the best existing type."

In foreign affairs concerning the governance of the Philippines, the President spoke on the progress of the Philippine people towards true self-determination. In reporting progress on the Panama Canal, the President said:

The work on the Panama Canal is being done with a speed, efficiency and entire devotion to duty which make it a model for all work of the kind. No task of such magnitude has ever before been undertaken by any nation; and no task of the kind has ever been better performed. The men on the isthmus, from Colonel Goethals and his fellow commissioners through the entire list of employees who are faithfully doing their duty, have won their right to the ungrudging respect and gratitude of the American people.

Preceded by 1907 State of the Union Address	State of the Union addresses 1908	Succeeded by 1909 State of the Union Address
