= 1897 State of the Union Address =

Speech by US President William McKinley

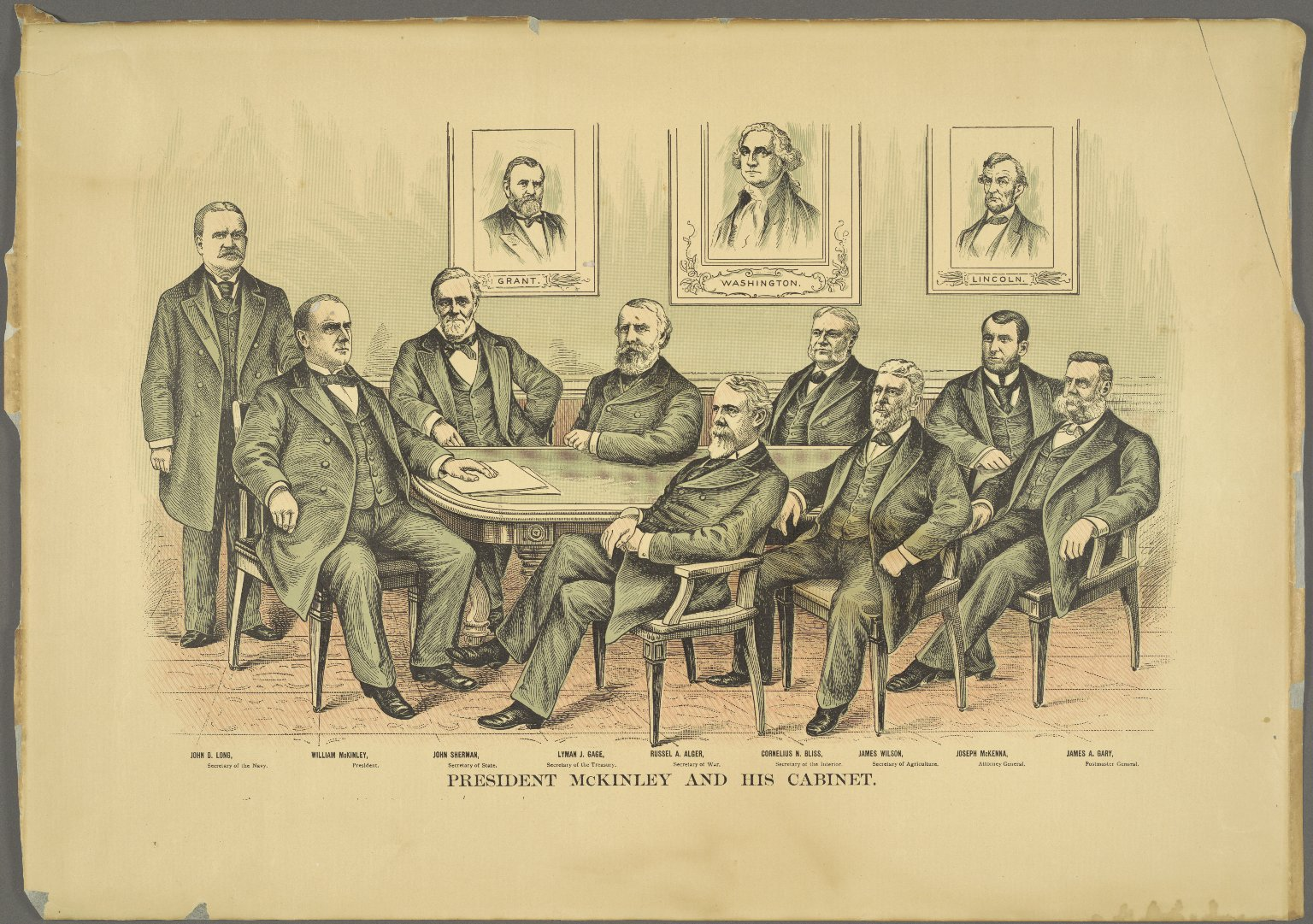
- President McKinley and His Cabinet Date Made: ca. 1897
- Date: December 6, 1897
- Venue: House Chamber, United States Capitol
- Location: Washington, D.C.; 38°53′23″N 77°00′32″W
- Type: State of the Union Address
- Participants: William McKinley; Garret Hobart; Thomas B. Reed
- Format: Written
- Previous: 1896 State of the Union Address
- Next: 1898 State of the Union Address

The 1897 State of the Union Address was a speech given on Monday, December 6, 1897, by President William McKinley, the 25th president of the United States. It was his first State of the Union Address, and was read to both houses of the 55th United States Congress. He began with, "A matter of genuine satisfaction is the growing feeling of fraternal regard and unification of all sections of our country, the incompleteness of which has too long delayed realization of the highest blessings of the Union. The spirit of patriotism is universal and is ever increasing in fervor." It took time for the Southern states to feel united with the Northern states, and for the Western states to feel united with the eastern states.

In foreign policy, the President mentions the progression of the annexation of Hawaii into the United States.

In domestic policy, the President mentions the Indian Appropriation Act, and the responsibility of the government now to engage with the Five Civilized Tribes in the matter of completing applications for citizenship.

Preceded by 1896 State of the Union Address	State of the Union addresses 1897	Succeeded by 1898 State of the Union Address
