= 1901 State of the Union Address =

Speech by US President Theodore Roosevelt

- Date: December 3, 1901
- Venue: House Chamber, United States Capitol
- Location: Washington, D.C.; 38°53′23″N 77°00′32″W
- Type: State of the Union Address
- Participants: Theodore Roosevelt
- Format: Written
- Previous: 1900 State of the Union Address
- Next: 1902 State of the Union Address

The 1901 State of the Union Address was given on Tuesday, December 3, 1901, by the 26th president of the United States, Theodore Roosevelt. It was presented to both houses of the 57th United States Congress, but he was not present. He stated, "The Congress assembles this year under the shadow of a great calamity. On the sixth of September, President McKinley was shot by an anarchist while attending the Pan-American Exposition at Buffalo, and died in that city on the fourteenth of that month." He concluded it with, "Indeed, from every quarter of the civilized world we received, at the time of the President's death, assurances of such grief and regard as to touch the hearts of our people. In the midst of our affliction we reverently thank the Almighty that we are at peace with the nations of mankind; and we firmly intend that our policy shall be such as to continue unbroken these international relations of mutual respect and good will."

In foreign policy, the President said about Philippines, which recently came under US governance:

In the Philippines our problem is larger. They are very rich tropical islands, inhabited by many varying tribes, representing widely different stages of progress toward civilization. Our earnest effort is to help these people upward along the stony and difficult path that leads to self-government. We hope to make our administration of the islands honorable to our Nation by making it of the highest benefit to the Filipinos themselves; and as an earnest of what we intend to do, we point to what we have done. Already a greater measure of material prosperity and of governmental honesty and efficiency has been attained in the Philippines than ever before in their history.

Preceded by 1900 State of the Union Address	State of the Union addresses 1901	Succeeded by 1902 State of the Union Address
