= 1900 State of the Union Address =

Speech by US President William McKinley

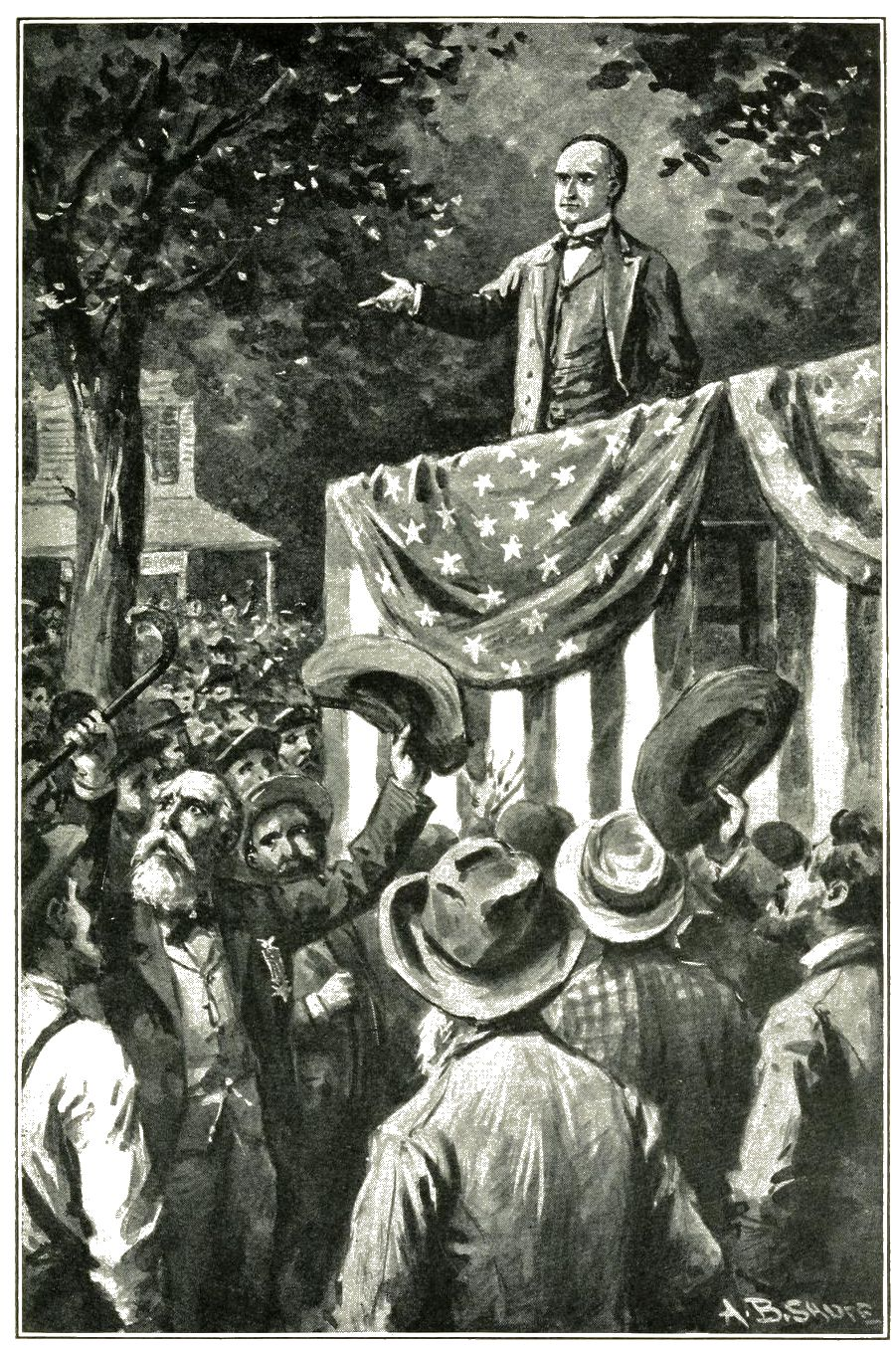
- Date: December 3, 1900
- Venue: House Chamber, United States Capitol
- Location: Washington, D.C.; 38°53′23″N 77°00′32″W
- Type: State of the Union Address
- Participants: William McKinley; William P. Frye; David B. Henderson
- Format: Written
- Previous: 1899 State of the Union Address
- Next: 1901 State of the Union Address

The 1900 State of the Union Address was written by William McKinley, the 25th president of the United States. He began it with these words: "At the outgoing of the old and the incoming of the new century you begin the last session of the 56th Congress with evidences on every hand of individual and national prosperity and with proof of the growing strength and increasing power for good of Republican institutions." It was the last of the four addresses given by McKinley. It was given as a written message to the 56th United States Congress. He did not deliver it as a speech.

In foreign policy, the President talks about the revolution that occurred in the Dominican Republic and the installation of President Jimenez. The completion of a telegraph line from the US to the German Empire was announced as completed. Additionally, the assassination of King Humbert was mentioned. The Bureau of American Republics effectiveness as a diplomatic body was also mentioned. Finally, President Mckinley talks about the commencement of the governance of Philippines by the US.

Preceded by 1899 State of the Union Address	State of the Union addresses 1900	Succeeded by 1901 State of the Union Address
