= Timeline of the William Howard Taft presidency =

The presidency of William Howard Taft began on March 4, 1909, when William Howard Taft was inaugurated the 27th president of the United States and ended on March 4, 1913.

== 1909 ==
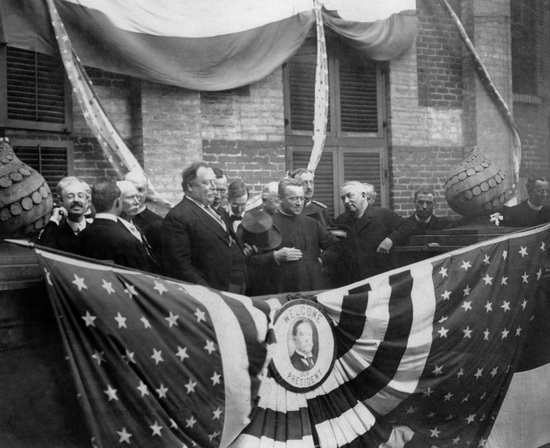
Taft visits New Orleans. October 30, 1909

- March 4 - The Inauguration of William Howard Taft takes place.
- April 7 - Taft orders that the deaf be allowed to take the civil service exam.
- April 19 - Taft attends a Major League Baseball game with Vice President James S. Sherman, the first such game to be spectated by a president.
- April 30 - Taft has the city of La Bova renanmed to Balboa in the Panama Canal Zone.
- May 17 - First Lady Helen Herron Taft suffers a stroke that leaves her partially paralyzed and speech impaired for the following year.
- May 22 - Taft orders 700,000 acres of federal land be opened for settlement in and around the Pacific Northwest.
- May 26 - Taft chooses the design of the Lincoln cent.
- June 16 - Taft recommends to Congress that an income tax amendment be made to the Constitution.
- June 28 - Taft hosts the first meal to be served on the roof of the White House.
- July 12 - Taft establishes the Oregon Caves National Monument and Preserve.
- July 15 - Taft contacts Prince Chun to request American involvement in the financing of Chinese railways.
- August 2 - The United States Army purchases the world's first military plane from the Wright brothers.
- July 31 - Taft establishes the Mukuntuweap National Monument, which would become Zion National Park.
- August 2 - The Lincoln Center is made available to the public.
- August 5 - Taft signs the Payne–Aldrich Tariff Act into law.
- August 7 - Taft relocates to his Summer White House in Beverly, Massachusetts.
- September 14 - Taft embarks on a tour throughout the United States.
- September 21 - Taft establishes the Shoshone Cavern National Monument.
- September 23 - Taft opens the Gunnison Tunnel in Colorado.
- September 27 - Taft sets aside over 3 million acres of land as the country's first Naval oil reserve.
- October 16 - Taft meets with Mexican President Porfirio Díaz in El Paso, Texas. He becomes the first sitting president to visit a foreign country when he dines with Díaz in Ciudad Juárez.
- November 1 - Taft establishes the Gran Quivira National Monument.
- November 10 - Taft returns to Washington, D.C. following his tour.
- November 18 - The United States sends two warships to Nicaragua following the execution of two Americans.
- November 21 - The United States demands reparations from Nicaragua for the killing of Americans.
- December 1 - The United States ends diplomatic relations with Nicaragua.
- December 7 - Taft delivers the 1909 State of the Union Address.
- December 13 - Taft nominates Horace Harmon Lurton to the Supreme Court of the United States.
- December 16 - Nicaraguan dictator José Santos Zelaya resigns under pressure from the American military.
- December 20 - Horace Harmon Lurton is confirmed as an Associate Justice of the Supreme Court.

== 1910 ==
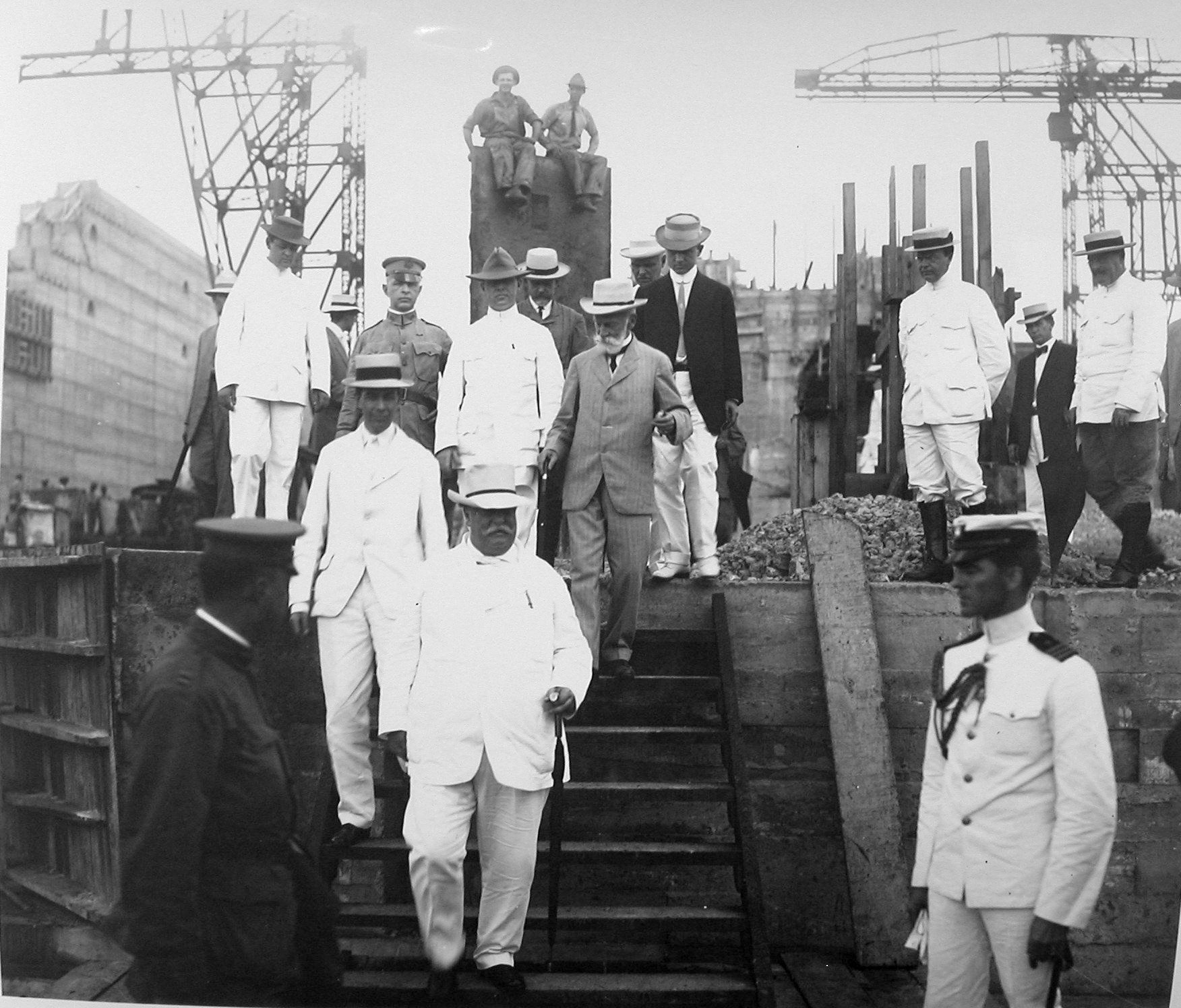
Taft tours construction of the Panama Canal. November 1910.

- January 1 - Taft invites the public into the White House to celebrate the new year.
- January 3 - Presidents of the major railroad companies meet with Taft to request he call off antitrust litigation.
- January 7 - Taft has Forestry Director Gifford Pinchot fired, setting off the events of the Pinchot–Ballinger controversy.
- February 1 - Secretary of State Philander C. Knox embarks on a tour of Central and South America.
- April 14 - Taft establishes the tradition of the president throwing the ceremonial first pitch.
- April 22 - Leonard Wood takes office as Chief of Staff of the United States Army.
- April 25 - Taft nominates Charles Evans Hughes to the Supreme Court of the United States.
- May 2 - Horace Harmon Lurton is sworn in as an associate justice of the Supreme Court.
- May 3 - Taft visits his hometown of Cincinnati and requests that he be treated without presidential honors.
- June 20 - Taft signs the Enabling Act of 1910 into law.
- June 25 - Taft signs the Federal Corrupt Practices Act, the Mann Act, and the Postal Savings Bank Act into law.
- June 27 - Robert A. Taft accidentally strikes a pedestrian with his car. President Taft offers compensation in addition to covering medical expenses.
- July 2 - Taft sets aside nearly 8.5 million acres as federal land in Alaska.
- July 7 - Taft sets aside over 35 million acres of federal land in the Western United States for coal mining.
- July 28 - Taft establishes the Eldorado National Forest.
- November 8 - Democrats take control of the House of Representatives in the 1910 United States elections.
- November 10 - Taft embarks on the USS Tennessee to visit the Panama Canal.
- November 14 - Taft arrives in Panama on board the USS Tennessee.
- November 16 - Speaking in Panama City, Taft reiterates that the United States will not annex Panama.
- November 20 - The Mexican Revolution begins.
- November 23 - Taft returns to the United States following visits to Panama and Cuba.
- December 1 - Taft hosts a debutante ball at the White House for his daughter Helen Taft.
- December 6 - Taft delivers the 1910 State of the Union Address.
- December 12 - Taft nominates Willis Van Devanter and Joseph Rucker Lamar to the Supreme Court and nominates Associate Justice Edward Douglass White as Chief Justice of the United States. White is confirmed as Chief Justice the same day.
- December 15 - Willis Van Devanter and Joseph Rucker Lamar are confirmed as Associate Justices.

== 1911 ==
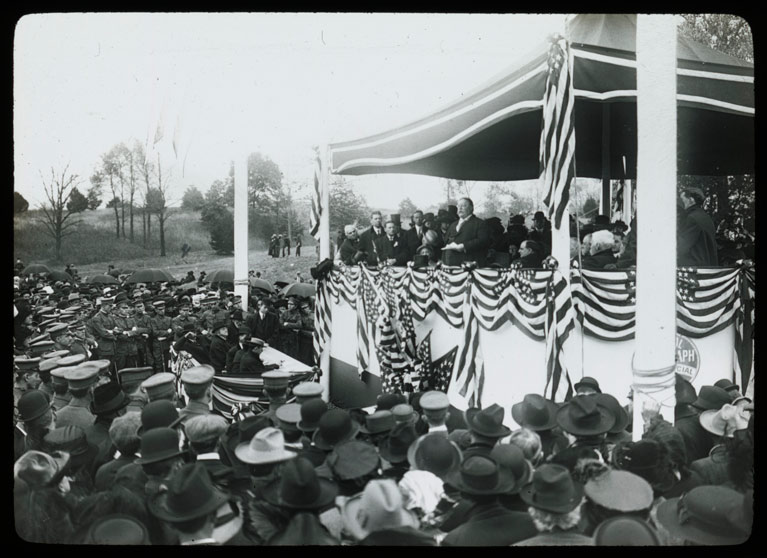
Taft dedicates Lincoln Memorial Hall. November 9, 1911.

- March 1 - Taft signs the Weeks Act into law.
- March 4 - Taft calls a special session of Congress to address unresolved issues.
- March 7 - The United States military mobilizes along the Mexican border as the Mexican Revolution risks spilling over into the United States.
- March 12 - Richard A. Ballinger resigns as Secretary of the Interior amid scandal.
- March 13 - Walter L. Fisher takes office as Secretary of the Interior.
- May 21 - Jacob M. Dickinson is no longer Secretary of War.
- May 22 - Henry L. Stimson takes office as Secretary of War.
- May 23 - Taft dedicates the New York Public Library alongside Andrew Carnegie.
- June 17 - Robert M. La Follette announces his candidacy for the Republican presidential nomination.
- July 14 - Aviator Harry Atwood flies from Boston to the White House, breaking the record for the longest airplane flight.
- August 4 - Taft meets with Admiral Tōgō Heihachirō of Japan.
- August 11 - Taft travels to his Summer White House in Beverly, Massachusetts.
- August 15 - Taft vetoes statehood of Arizona and New Mexico over a provision in the Arizona Constitution allowing judicial recall.
- September 15 - Taft embarks on a tour across the United States.
- October 14 - Taft breaks ground on the Panama–Pacific International Exposition that would take place in 1915.
- October 16 - Two men place dynamite on a railroad in California ahead of Taft's car. Security guard Abe Jenkins discovers the dynamite before the president arrives.
- October 26 - Taft files an antitrust suit against U.S. Steel.
- November 2 - Taft inspects the Naval fleet as he receives a 3,690 gun salute.
- November 9 - Taft dedicates Lincoln Memorial Hall in Hodgenville, Kentucky.
- November 12 - Taft returns to the White House after 87 days away.
- December 5 - Taft delivers the 1911 State of the Union Address.

== 1912 ==
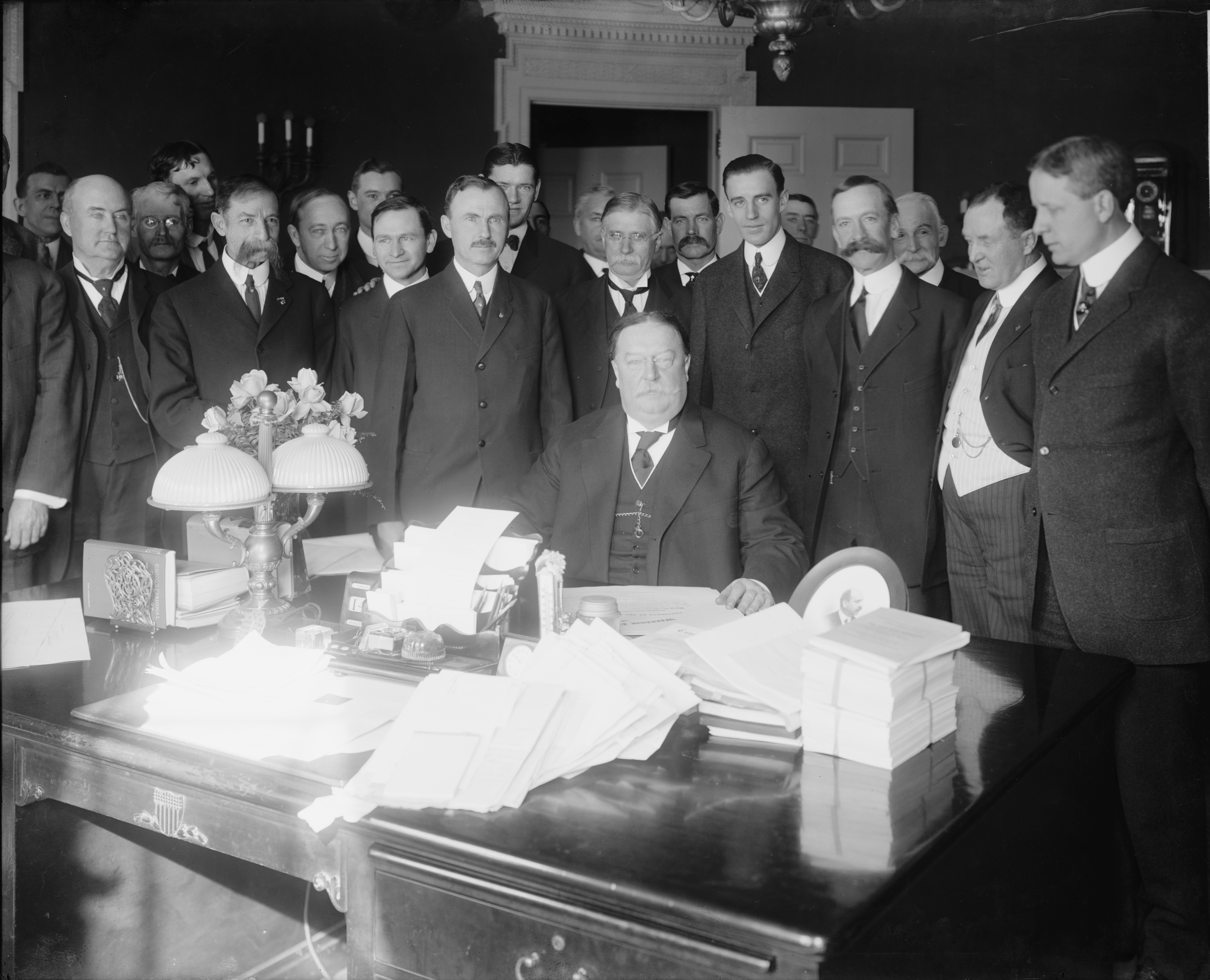
Taft signing the Arizona Statehood Bill. February 14, 1912.

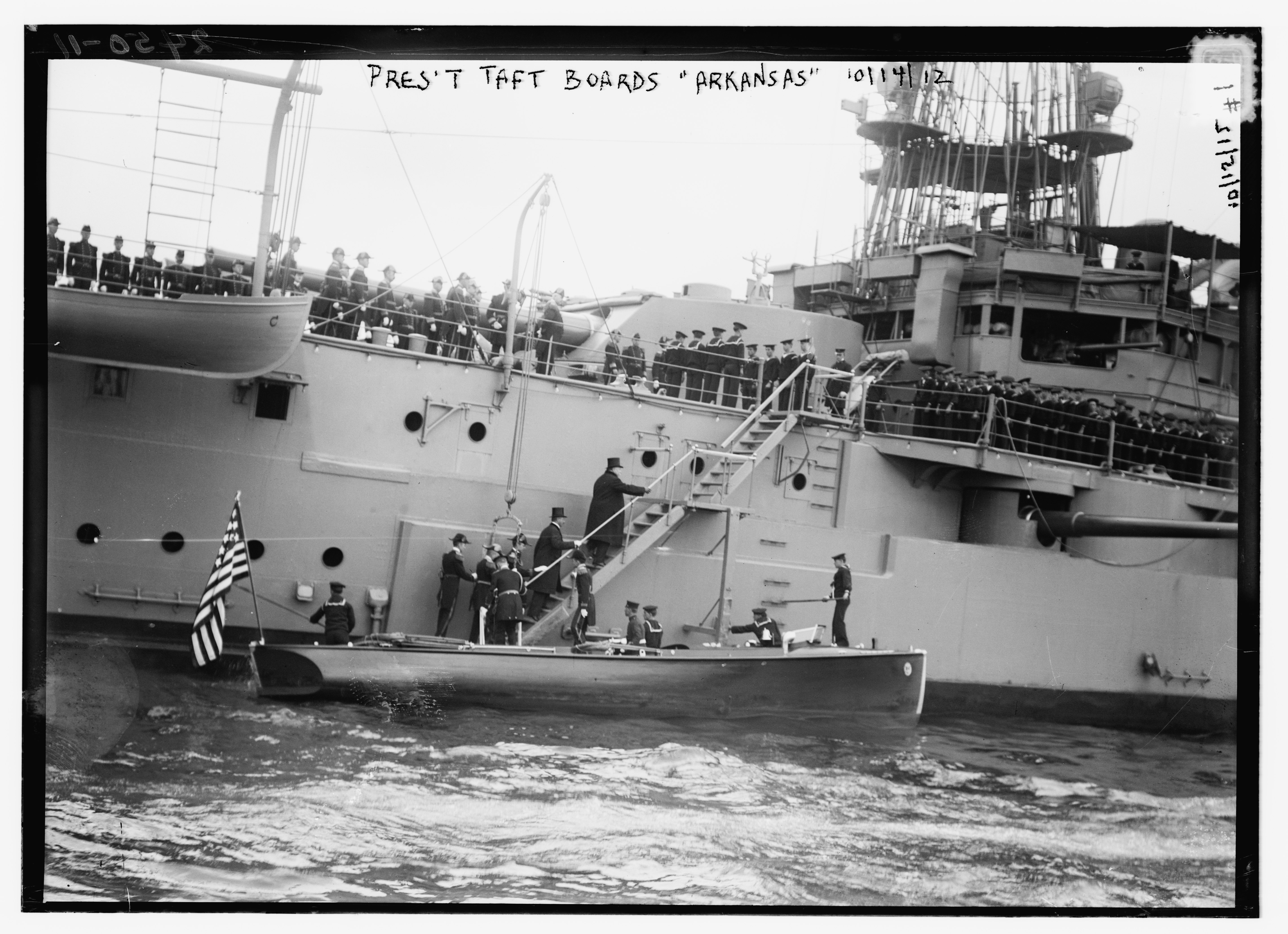
Taft boarding the USS Arkansas. October 14, 1912.

- January 6 - New Mexico is admitted as the 47th state.
- January 18 - Taft pardons Charles W. Morse, believing him to be terminally ill.
- February 6 - Taft declares his intention to name William Cather Hook as a Supreme Court nominee. He rescinds the suggestion following backlash from the African-American community.
- February 14 - Arizona is admitted as the 48th state.
- February 19 - Taft nominates Mahlon Pitney to the Supreme Court of the United States.
- February 22 - Former President Theodore Roosevelt announces his candidacy for the Republican presidential nomination.
- March 2 - Taft urges that American citizens prepare to evacuate Mexico as the Mexican Revolution escalates.
- March 13 - Mahlon Pitney is confirmed as an Associate Justice.
- March 14 - Taft issues an embargo on weapon sales to Mexico.
- March 19 - North Dakota hosts the first ever statewide primary. Taft finishes third behind Theodore Roosevelt and Robert M. La Follette.
- April 17 - Julia Lathrop becomes the first woman to lead a federal agency in the United States as director of the United States Children's Bureau.
- May 11 - The Territory of Alaska is incorporated into the United States.
- June 3 - Taft welcomes visiting German Naval officers in Hampton Roads.
- June 5 - U.S. Marines land in Cuba.
- June 19 - Taft signs into law the eight-hour workday for federal employees.
- June 22 - The Republican National Convention nominates Taft as its presidential candidate.
- June 24 - Taft establishes federal regulations for the design of the Flag of the United States, also adding two stars for Arizona and New Mexico.
- July 31 - Taft signs the Sims Act into law.
- August 4 - The United States begins its occupation of Nicaragua at the request of the Nicaraguan government.
- August 5 - The Progressive Party splits off from the Republican Party to nominate Theodore Roosevelt.
- August 24 - Taft signs the Panama Canal Act into law.
- September 2 - Taft sets aside the first Naval oil reserve to be used in the event of war in Kern County, California.
- September 23 - Taft bans all foreign ships from accessing Pearl Harbor, Guantánamo Bay, Subic Bay, and Guam.
- September 24 - U.S. Marines restore order in the Dominican Republic amid the Dominican Civil War.
- October 14 - Theodore Roosevelt is shot while campaigning for the presidency.
- October 30 - Vice President James S. Sherman dies of kidney failure at the age of 57.
- November 5 - Taft finishes third in the 1912 presidential election behind Woodrow Wilson and Theodore Roosevelt.
- December 3 - Taft delivers the 1912 State of the Union Address.
- December 15 - US Ambassador to the UK Whitelaw Reid dies at the age of 75.
- December 21 - Taft embarks on the USS Arkansas to visit the Panama Canal.
- December 25 - An attempt is made on Taft's life as a road in Colón, Panama is destroyed by dynamite only minutes after Taft had crossed it.

== 1913 ==
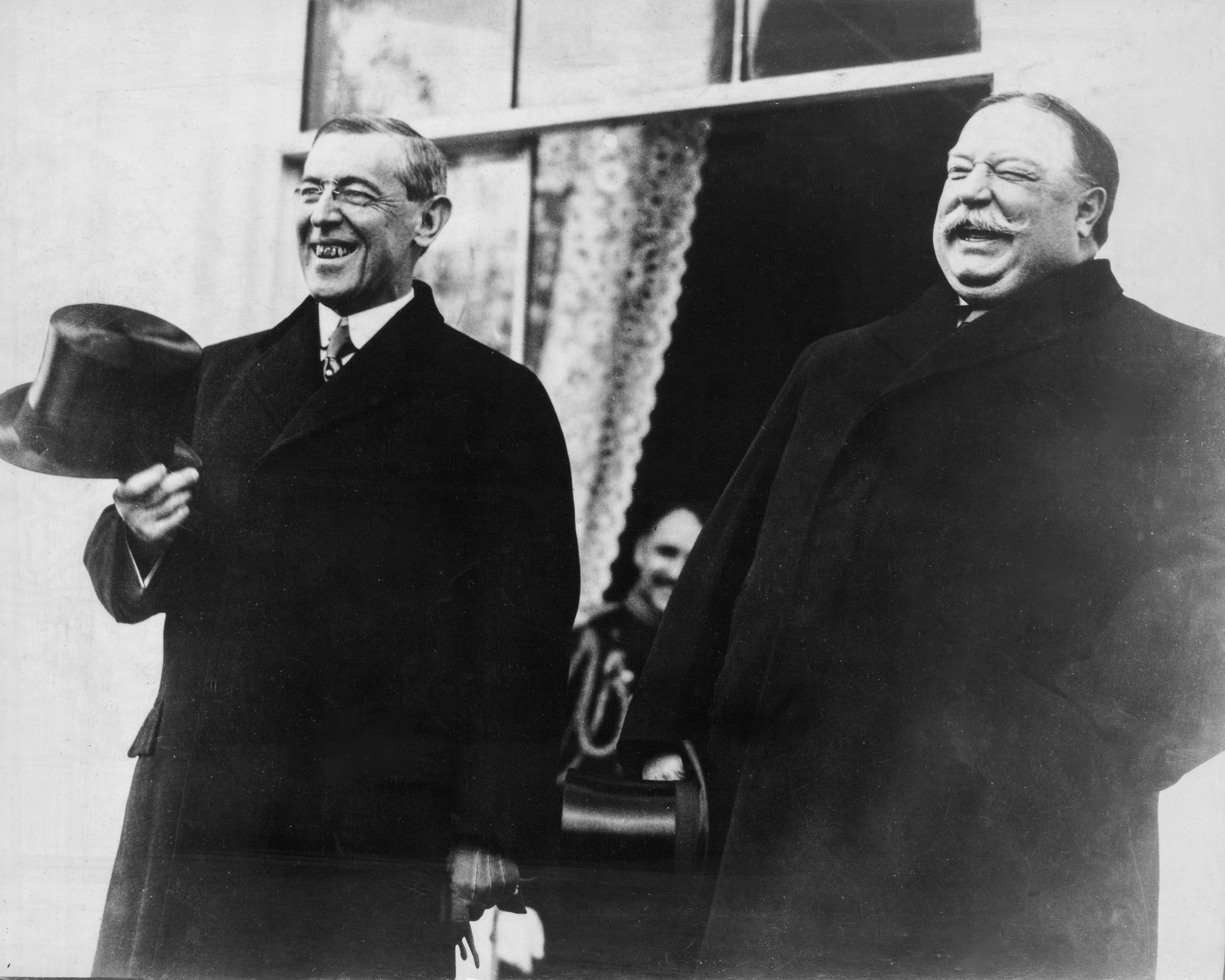
Taft with Woodrow Wilson prior to the latter's inauguration. March 4, 1913.

- January 20 - Taft accepts a position as professor at Yale Law School.
- February 8 - Taft personally attends a session of Congress to deliver a eulogy for Vice President James S. Sherman. This is the first time a president has attended a session of Congress personally since 1801.
- February 14 - Taft vetoes an immigration bill that would require literacy tests.
- February 22 - Taft deploys thousands of soldiers to Galveston, Texas to prepare for potential war with Mexico.
- February 25 - The Sixteenth Amendment to the United States Constitution is ratified.
- March 4 - Taft signs into law the creation of the Department of Labor as a distinct entity from the US Department of Commerce and Labor.
- March 4 - Woodrow Wilson is inaugurated as the 28th President of the United States.

== See also ==
- Timeline of the Theodore Roosevelt presidency, for his predecessor
- Timeline of the Woodrow Wilson presidency, for his successor
