= 1913 State of the Union Address =

Speech by US President Woodrow Wilson

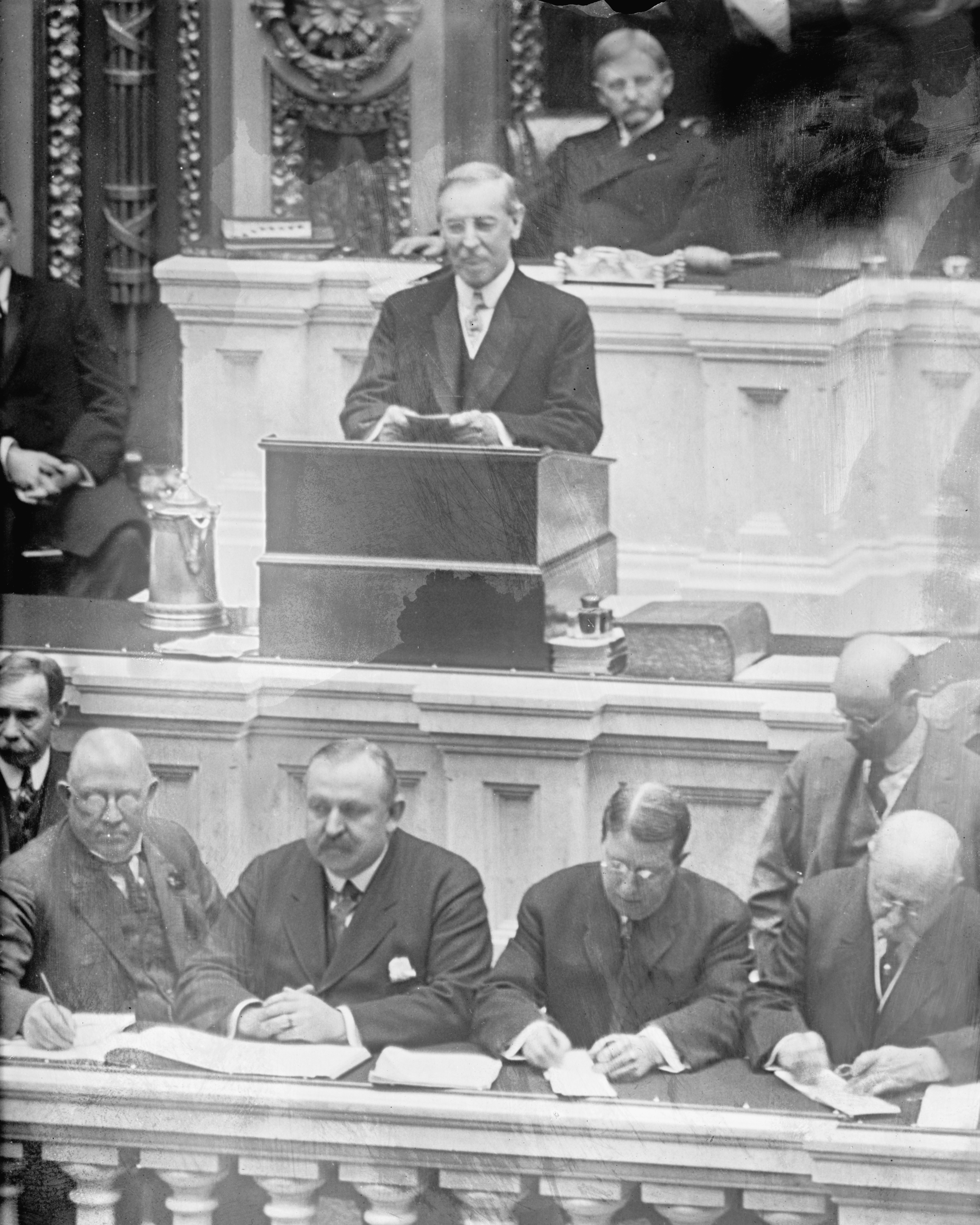
- Woodrow Wilson giving his State of the Union address
- Date: December 2, 1913
- Venue: House Chamber, United States Capitol
- Location: Washington, D.C.; 38°53′23″N 77°00′32″W
- Type: State of the Union Address
- Participants: Woodrow Wilson; Thomas R. Marshall; Champ Clark
- Previous: 1912 State of the Union Address
- Next: 1914 State of the Union Address

The 1913 State of the Union Address was given by Woodrow Wilson, the 28th president of the United States, on Tuesday, December 2, 1913. It was given directly to the 63rd United States Congress by the president as a speech. Wilson was the first to deliver it as a speech, rather than a written message, since John Adams in 1800. With a few exceptions, all addresses since then have been given directly following Wilson's lead.

It was his first State of the Union Address. He stated, "The country, I am thankful to say, is at peace with all the world, and many happy manifestations multiply about us of a growing cordiality and sense of community of interest among the nations, foreshadowing an age of settled peace and good will." The speech was just over 3,500 words and took 28 minutes to read.

On foreign policy related to the Philippines the president said: “ At last, I hope and believe, we are beginning to gain the confidence of the Filipino peoples. By their counsel and experience, rather than by our own, we shall learn how best to serve them and how soon it will be possible and wise to withdraw our supervision. Let us once find the path and set out with firm and confident tread upon it and we shall not wander from it or linger upon it.”

Preceded by 1912 State of the Union Address	State of the Union addresses 1913	Succeeded by 1914 State of the Union Address
