= 1918 State of the Union Address =

Speech by US President Woodrow Wilson

- Date: December 2, 1918
- Venue: House Chamber, United States Capitol
- Location: Washington, D.C.; 38°53′23″N 77°00′32″W
- Type: State of the Union Address
- Participants: Woodrow Wilson; Thomas R. Marshall; Champ Clark
- Previous: 1917 State of the Union Address
- Next: 1919 State of the Union Address

The 1918 State of the Union Address was given by the 28th president of the United States, Woodrow Wilson, on Monday, December 2, 1918, to the houses of the 65th United States Congress. He gave these war statistics, "A year ago we had sent 145,918 men overseas. Since then we have sent 1,950,513, an average of 162,542 each month, the number in fact rising, in May last, to 245,951, in June to 278,760, in July to 307,182, and continuing to reach similar figures in August and September, in August 289,570 and in September 257,438." By the end of 1918, America had won the peace, and World War I was over. He said, "And throughout it all how fine the spirit of the nation was: what unity of purpose, what untiring zeal!" He ended with, "I shall make my absence as brief as possible and shall hope to return with the happy assurance that it has been possible to translate into action the great ideals for which America has striven."

The President notably mentioned that employment would need to be found for the returning veterans of the war, recommended advancement of the plans of the Secretary of the Interior towards allocating additional land for cultivation and more development of railways, waterways, highways and country roads.

Preceded by 1917 State of the Union Address	State of the Union addresses 1918	Succeeded by 1919 State of the Union Address
