= 1917 State of the Union Address =

Speech by US President Woodrow Wilson

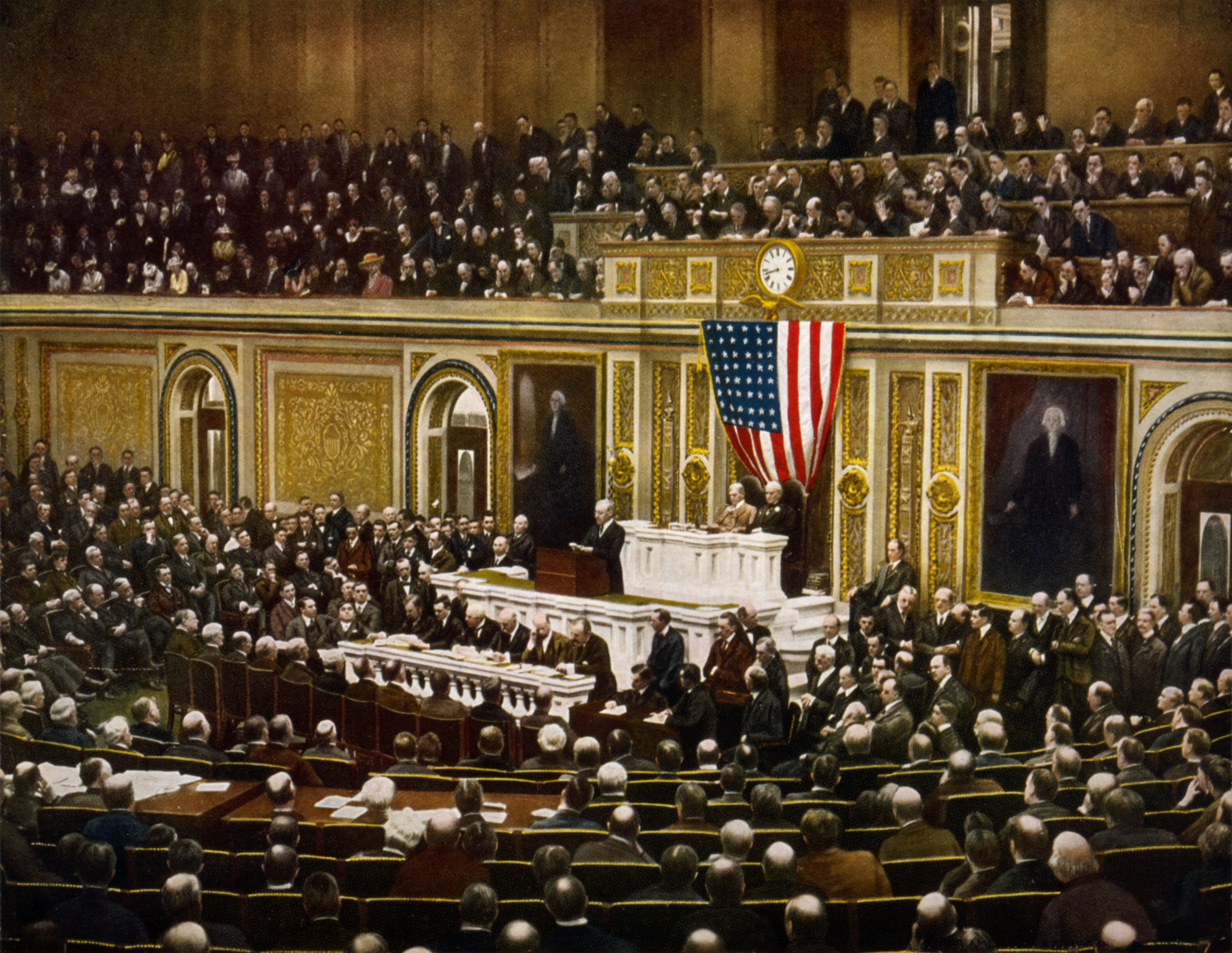
- President Woodrow Wilson asking Congress to declare war on Germany on April 2, 1917
- Date: December 4, 1917
- Venue: House Chamber, United States Capitol
- Location: Washington, D.C.; 38°53′23″N 77°00′32″W
- Type: State of the Union Address
- Participants: Woodrow Wilson; Thomas R. Marshall; Champ Clark
- Previous: 1916 State of the Union Address
- Next: 1918 State of the Union Address

The 1917 State of the Union Address was given by Woodrow Wilson, the 28th president of the United States on Tuesday, December 4, 1917, during his second term. He spoke in the United States House of Representatives chamber, in the United States Capitol. He said, "I shall not go back to debate the causes of the war. The intolerable wrongs done and planned against us by the sinister masters of Germany have long since become too grossly obvious and odious to every true American to need to be rehearsed." He addressed the 65th United States Congress, and spoke of World War I. He ended with, "A supreme moment of history has come. The eyes of the people have been opened and they see. The hand of God is laid upon the nations. He will show them favor, I devoutly believe, only if they rise to the clear heights of His own justice and mercy." In the middle of the speech, he said this about the German Empire, "The worst that can happen to the detriment the German people is this, that if they should still, after the war is over, continue to be obliged to live under ambitious and intriguing masters interested to disturb the peace of the world, men or classes of men whom the other peoples of the world could not trust, it might be impossible to admit them to the partnership of nations which must henceforth guarantee the world's peace." He is saying that empires' do not promote world peace. A year after he gave this speech, on December 4, 1918, the United States military would swallow Germany in victory, and the saying that is written would come true, "Death has been swallowed up in victory."

Preceded by 1916 State of the Union Address	State of the Union addresses 1917	Succeeded by 1918 State of the Union Address
