= 1914 State of the Union Address =

Speech by US President Woodrow Wilson

- Date: December 8, 1914
- Venue: House Chamber, United States Capitol
- Location: Washington, D.C.; 38°53′23″N 77°00′32″W
- Type: State of the Union Address
- Participants: Woodrow Wilson; Thomas R. Marshall; Champ Clark
- Previous: 1913 State of the Union Address
- Next: 1915 State of the Union Address

The 1914 State of the Union Address was given by Woodrow Wilson, the 28th United States president, on Tuesday, December 8, 1914, to both houses of 63rd United States Congress. He concluded it with, "To develop our life and our resources; to supply our own people, and the people of the world as their need arises, from the abundant plenty of our fields and our marts of trade to enrich the commerce of our own States and of the world with the products of our mines, our farms, and our factories, with the creations of our thought and the fruits of our character,-this is what will hold our attention and our enthusiasm steadily, now and in the years to come, as we strive to show in our life as a nation what liberty and the inspirations of an emancipated spirit may do for men and for societies, for individuals, for states, and for mankind."

In regards to preparedness for World War I, the President said:

If asked, Are you ready to defend yourselves? we reply, Most assuredly, to the utmost; and yet we shall not turn America into a military camp. We will not ask our young men to spend the best years of their lives making soldiers of themselves. There is another sort of energy in us. It will know how to declare itself and make itself effective should occasion arise. And especially when half the world is on fire we shall be careful to make our moral insurance against the spread of the conflagration very definite and certain and adequate indeed.

Preceded by 1913 State of the Union Address	State of the Union addresses 1914	Succeeded by 1915 State of the Union Address
