= 1916 State of the Union Address =

Speech by US President Woodrow Wilson

- Date: December 5, 1916
- Venue: House Chamber, United States Capitol
- Location: Washington, D.C.; 38°53′23″N 77°00′32″W
- Type: State of the Union Address
- Participants: Woodrow Wilson; Thomas R. Marshall; Champ Clark
- Previous: 1915 State of the Union Address
- Next: 1917 State of the Union Address

The 1916 State of the Union Address was given by Woodrow Wilson, the 28th president of the United States, on Tuesday, December 5, 1916. He personally addressed the 64th United States Congress. It was given on the eve of the United States' intervention in World War I. He said, "And, sixth, the lodgment in the hands of the Executive of the power, in case of military necessity, to take control of such portions and such rolling stock of the railways of the country as may be required for military use and to operate them for military purposes, with authority to draft into the military service of the United States such train crews and administrative officials as the circumstances require for their safe and efficient use."

In other domestic matters, the President advocated for the eight hour work day, in the Adamson Act. The President also advocated for the expansion of the Interstate Commerce Commission in order to undertake additional duties like complaint redress.

He ended with, "Inasmuch as this is, gentlemen, probably the last occasion I shall have to address the Sixty-fourth Congress, I hope that you will permit me to say with what genuine pleasure and satisfaction I have co-operated with you in the many measures of constructive policy with which you have enriched the legislative annals of the country." The 1916 presidential election was over, and Wilson had been re-elected.

Preceded by 1915 State of the Union Address	State of the Union addresses 1916	Succeeded by 1917 State of the Union Address
