= 1915 State of the Union Address =

Speech by US President Woodrow Wilson

- Date: December 7, 1915
- Venue: House Chamber, United States Capitol
- Location: Washington, D.C.; 38°53′23″N 77°00′32″W
- Type: State of the Union Address
- Participants: Woodrow Wilson; Thomas R. Marshall; Champ Clark
- Previous: 1914 State of the Union Address
- Next: 1916 State of the Union Address

The 1915 State of the Union Address was given by Woodrow Wilson, the 28th president of the United States on Tuesday, December 7, 1915. It was given to a joint session of the 64th United States Congress, to the United States Senate and United States House of Representatives. He said these words: "The moral is, that the states of America are not hostile rivals but cooperating friends, and that their growing sense of community or interest, alike in matters political and in matters economic, is likely to give them a new significance as factors in international affairs and in the political history of the world."

On the subject of preparedness for war, the President spoke of expanding the armed forces, he spoke about how patriotism would aid in this cause by saying:

It would depend upon the patriotic feeling of the younger men of the country whether they responded to such a call to service or not. It would depend upon the patriotic spirit of the employers of the country whether they made it possible for the younger men in their employ to respond under favorable conditions or not. I, for one, do not doubt the patriotic devotion either of our young men or of those who give them employment,--those for whose benefit and protection they would in fact enlist. I would look forward to the success of such an experiment with entire confidence.

Preceded by 1914 State of the Union Address	State of the Union addresses 1915	Succeeded by 1916 State of the Union Address
