= Timeline of the Warren G. Harding presidency =

Warren G. Harding was inaugurated as the 29th president of the United States on March 4, 1921, and served as president until his death on August 2, 1923, 881 days later. During his presidency, he organized international disarmament agreements, addressed major labor disputes, enacted legislation and regulations pertaining to veterans' rights, and traveled west to visit Alaska.

Harding inherited the aftermath of World War I after taking office in 1921, requiring him to formally end American involvement and participate in the polarized discussion of veterans' affairs, including the debate surrounding the Bonus Bill. The massive scale of World War I would prompt him to organize the Washington Naval Conference to promote disarmament. He also inherited labor disputes that would persist throughout his presidency, some of which escalated into riots and armed insurrections. Harding toured the Southern United States in October 1921 to speak in favor of civil rights.

In 1922, Harding worked to support and encourage ratification of the Four-Power Treaty that came of the Washington Naval Conference. His administration was beset by scandal in March 1922 after the president dismissed officials at the Bureau of Engraving and Printing, and the events of the larger Teapot Dome scandal began the following month when the Department of the Interior leased the Teapot Dome oil reserves to Harry Ford Sinclair. Harding was forced to personally broker agreements amidst coal and rail strikes that escalated into violence in the summer of 1922. His activities as president were subdued in the final months of 1922 after his wife fell seriously ill.

In 1923, Harding formally ended the American occupation of Germany and negotiated the payment of World War I reparations. In June 1923, he undertook a months-long Voyage of Understanding to tour the Western United States and the Territory of Alaska, also visiting British Columbia. He fell ill and died during this trip on August 2, 1923.

The timeline below includes notable events that took place during Harding's presidency, including the president's travels, speaking engagements, and notable meetings, as well as major government actions and other historical events that directly affected the presidency.

== 1921 ==
=== March 1921 ===
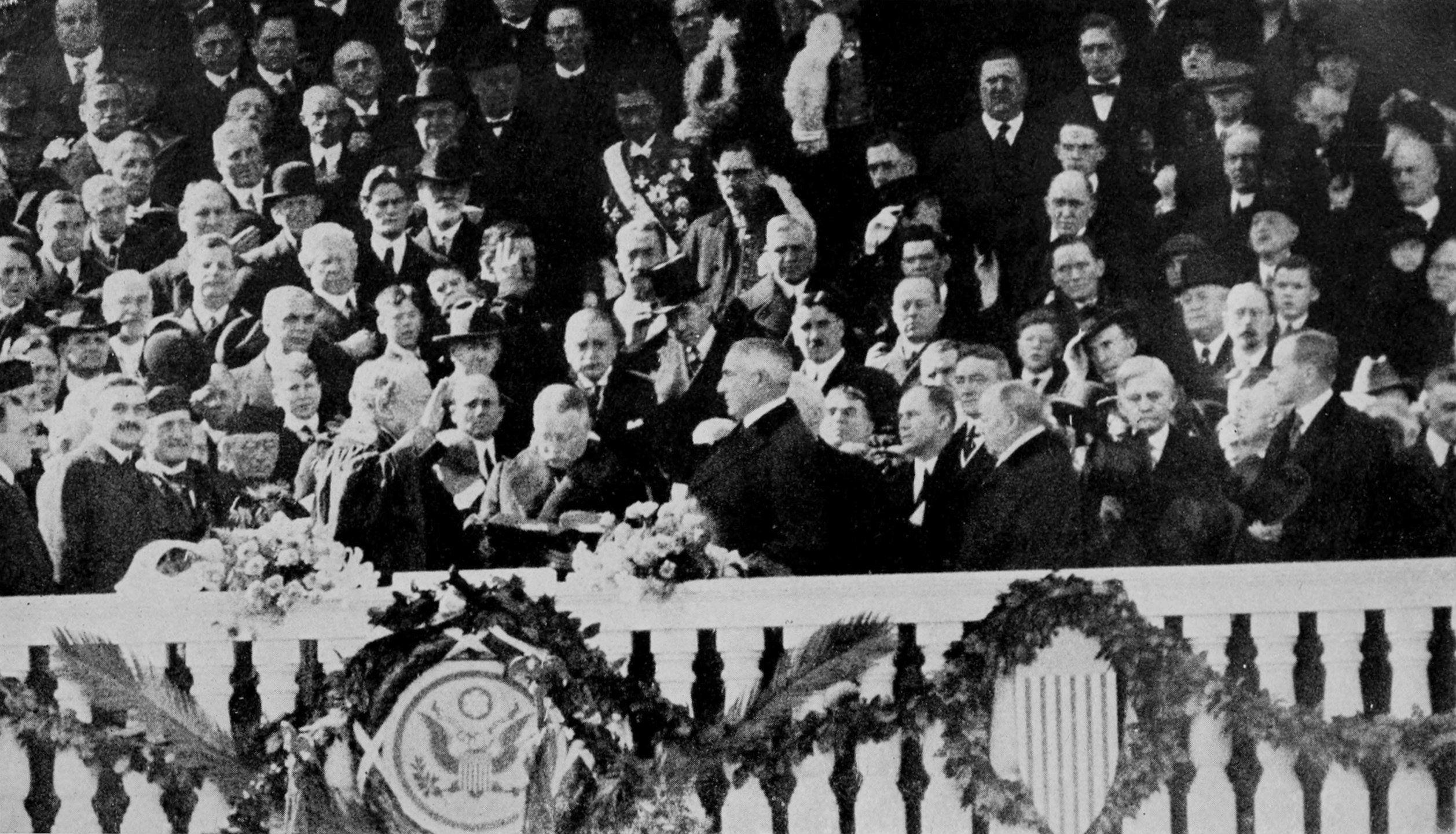
Harding takes the Oath of Office on March 4, 1921.

- March 4 – The inauguration of Warren G. Harding takes place. Harding County, New Mexico, is established and named in his honor.
- March 5 – Harding takes his first foreign policy action by demanding cessation of hostilities between Costa Rica and Panama.
- March 9 – Harding requests that the Senate ratify the Thomson–Urrutia Treaty.
- March 11 – Harding orders the Department of Labor to mediate a labor dispute in meat factories.
- March 17 – Harding forbids American troops from marching in support of an independent Ireland.
- March 20 – Harding visits Walter Reed Hospital to inspect the facility and speak to disabled veterans.
- March 25 – Harding meets former president William Howard Taft at the White House.
- March 28 – Harding restores the practice of hosting a children's egg rolling event on the White House lawn.
- March 29 – Harding establishes a committee led by Charles G. Dawes to investigate the needs of veterans.
- March 30 – Harding meets former French Prime Minister René Viviani at the White House.

=== April 1921 ===
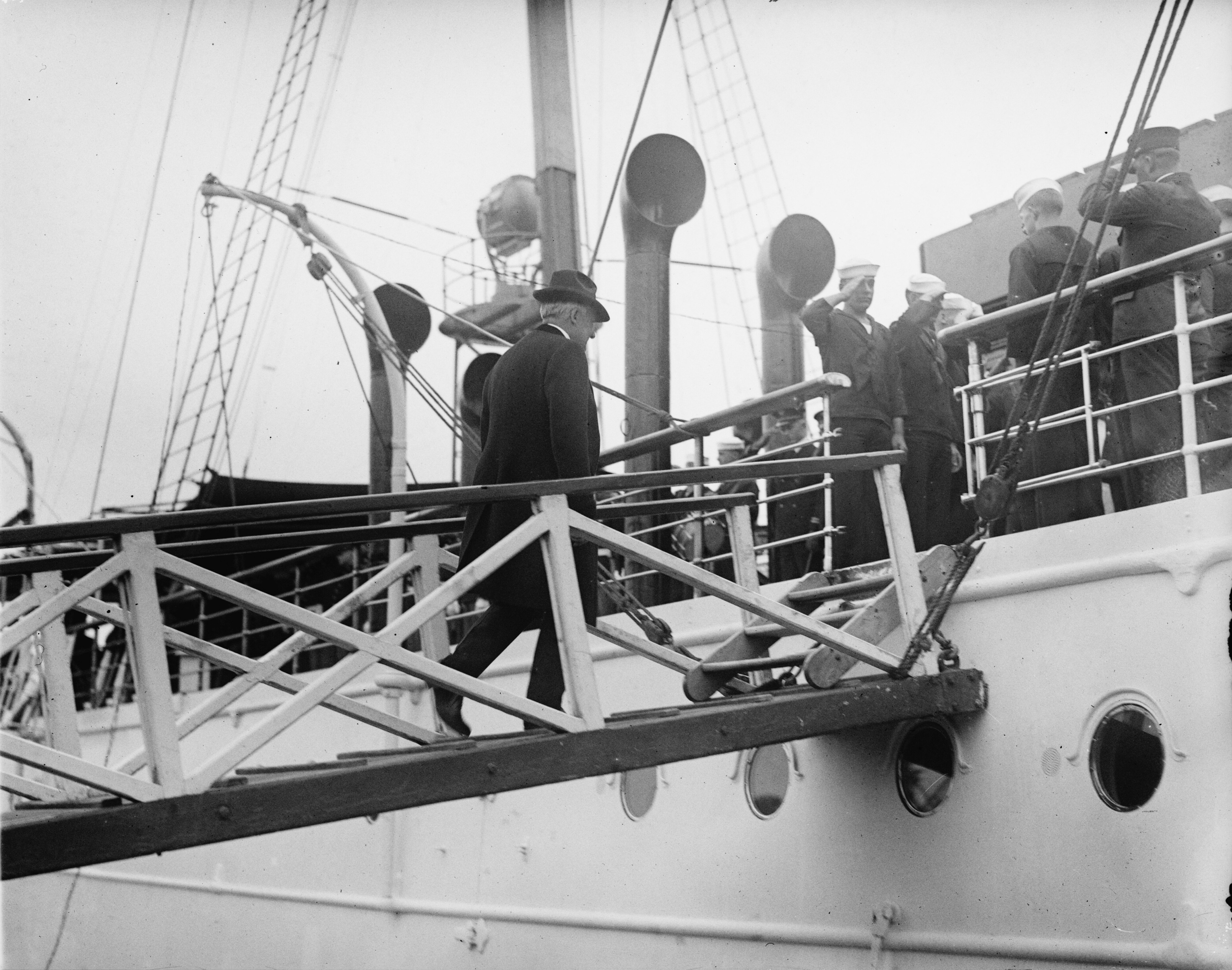
Harding boards the USS Mayflower on April 27, 1922.

- April 2 – A man falsely claiming to be Harding's cousin and assistant secretary is arrested by the Secret Service on impersonation charges.
- April 4 – The United States takes the official position that Germany is financially responsible for World War I.
- April 12 – Harding addresses a joint session of Congress where he supports the Treaty of Versailles and opposes the League of Nations.
- April 15 – Harding meets President of Liberia Charles D. B. King at the White House.
- April 19 – Harding dedicates the Equestrian statue of Simón Bolívar in New York.
- April 20 – The Senate ratifies the Thomson–Urrutia Treaty.
- April 28 – Harding reviews the Naval fleet while aboard the USS Mayflower.

=== May 1921 ===
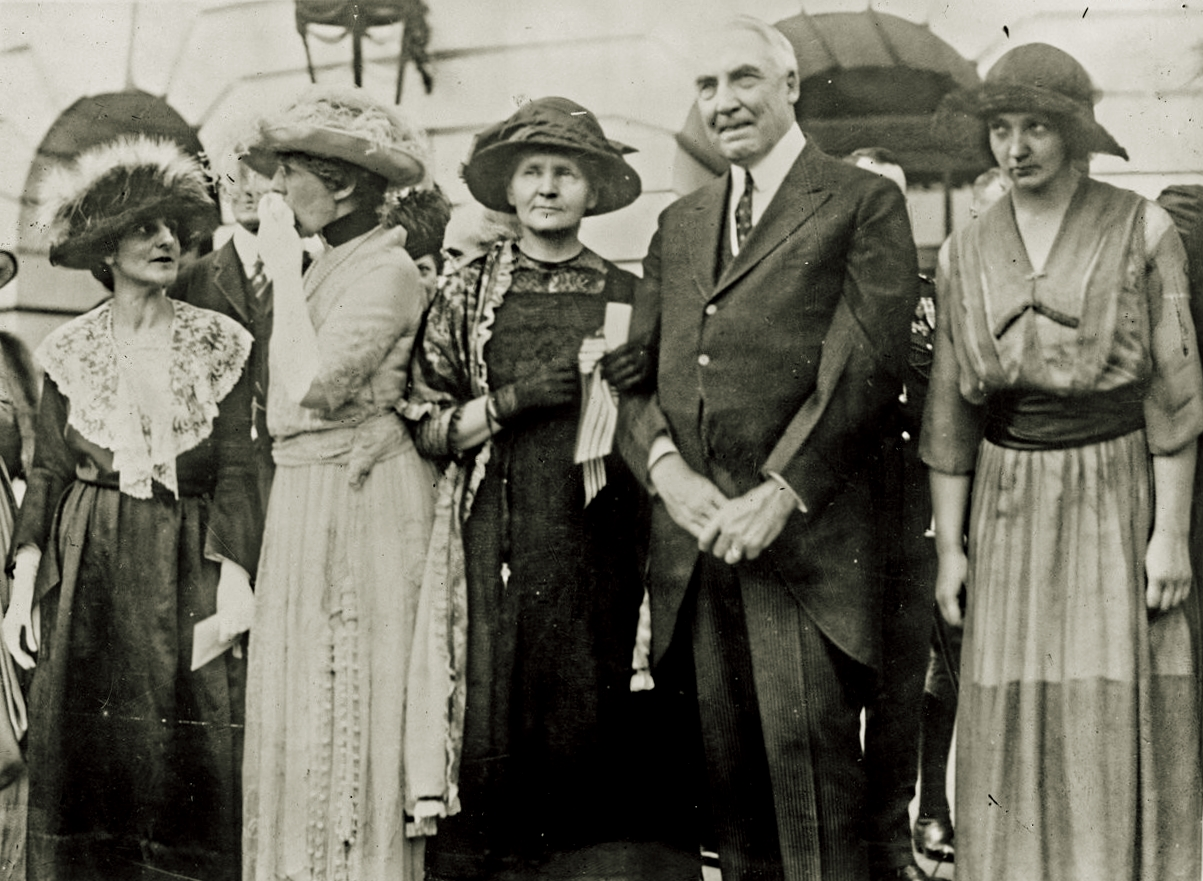
Harding with Marie Curie on May 20, 1921

- May 3 – Harding orders the executive departments to keep balanced budgets.
- May 6 – Harding announces that the United States will participate with Europe in post-war negotiations.
- May 11 – Harding loosens a rule from the Wilson administration that enforced civil service regulations in the selection of postmasters.
- May 14 – Harding signs declarations of martial law to be invoked in response to a laborer insurgency.
- May 19 – Harding signs the Emergency Quota Act into law.
- May 20 – Harding meets physicist and chemist Marie Curie at the White House.
- May 21 – Harding attends the funeral of Chief Justice Edward Douglass White.
- May 23 – Harding speaks in honor of those killed during World War I.
- May 23 – Harding promises limited interference in business by his administration and asks agriculture, labor, and business to work together at the 125th anniversary dinner of the New York Commercial.
- May 25 – Harding meets prominent American bankers at the White House to discuss foreign economic policy.
- May 27 – Harding signs the Emergency Tariff of 1921 into law.
- May 29 – Harding speaks at Pohick Church.
- May 31 – Control of Naval oil reserves is transferred from the Department of the Navy to the Department of the Interior.

=== June 1921 ===
- June 1 – The Tulsa race massacre takes place.
- June 2 – Harding speaks to the students of the Naval Academy.
- June 3 – Harding attends a schoolchildren's pageant in his honor.
- June 4 – Harding travels to Pennsylvania as the guest of Senator Philander C. Knox.
- June 6 – Harding speaks to the students of Lincoln University about the Tulsa race massacre and racial equality.
- June 10 – The Budget and Accounting Act is signed into law.
- June 16 – Harding intervenes in a dispute between the railroad and fruit industries.
- June 18 – Harding hosts several officials on a weekend cruise on the USS Mayflower.
- June 23 – Harding meets with Representative Joseph W. Fordney at the White House to expedite economic legislation.
- June 30 – Harding nominates former president William Howard Taft as Chief Justice of the United States, who is confirmed by the Senate on the same day.

=== July 1921 ===
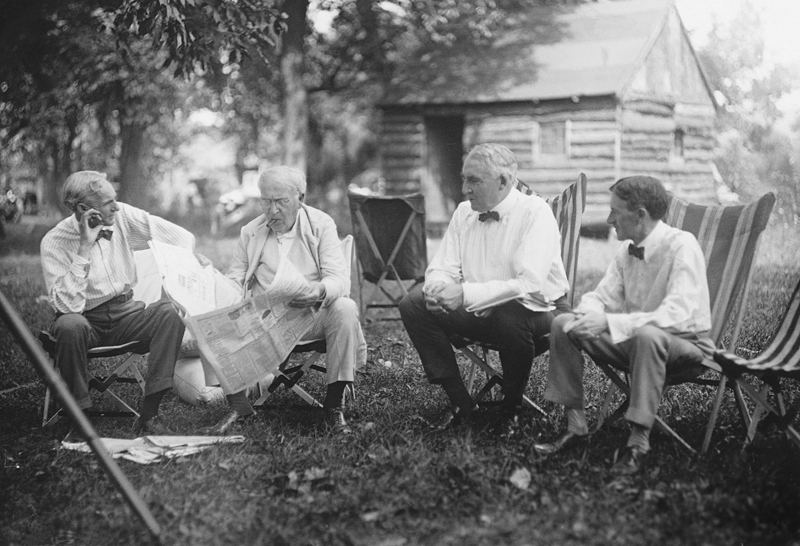
Harding camps with Ford, Edison, and Firestone in July 1921.

- July 2 – Harding signs the Knox–Porter Resolution, declaring an official end to the state of war during World War I.
- July 4 – Harding celebrates Independence Day at Senator Theodore Frelinghuysen's home in New Jersey.
- July 6 – Harding meets with Representative Benjamin K. Focht to discuss the administration of Washington D.C.
- July 8 – Harding visits the Capitol Building to facilitate discussion of economic policy.
- July 9 – Harding invites several officials to a weekend excursion on the USS Mayflower down the Potomac River.
- July 12 – Harding addresses the Senate to discourage the passage of an adjusted compensation bill.
- July 16 – The League of Nations endorses the Harding disarmament plan.
- July 16 – Harding invites several officials to his second excursion on the USS Mayflower this month.
- July 23 – Harding goes camping with businessmen Harvey S. Firestone, Henry Ford, and Thomas Edison at Licking Creek.
- July 25 – Imposter Stanley Clifford Weyman successfully arranges a meeting between Harding and Princess Fatma Gevheri Osmanoglu.
- July 27 – Harding hosts dinner with Senators at the White House to discuss tax policy.
- July 28 – Harding hosts dinner with House representatives at the White House to discuss tax policy.
- July 29 – Harding departs on board the USS Mayflower for a vacation in the Northeast.

=== August 1921 ===
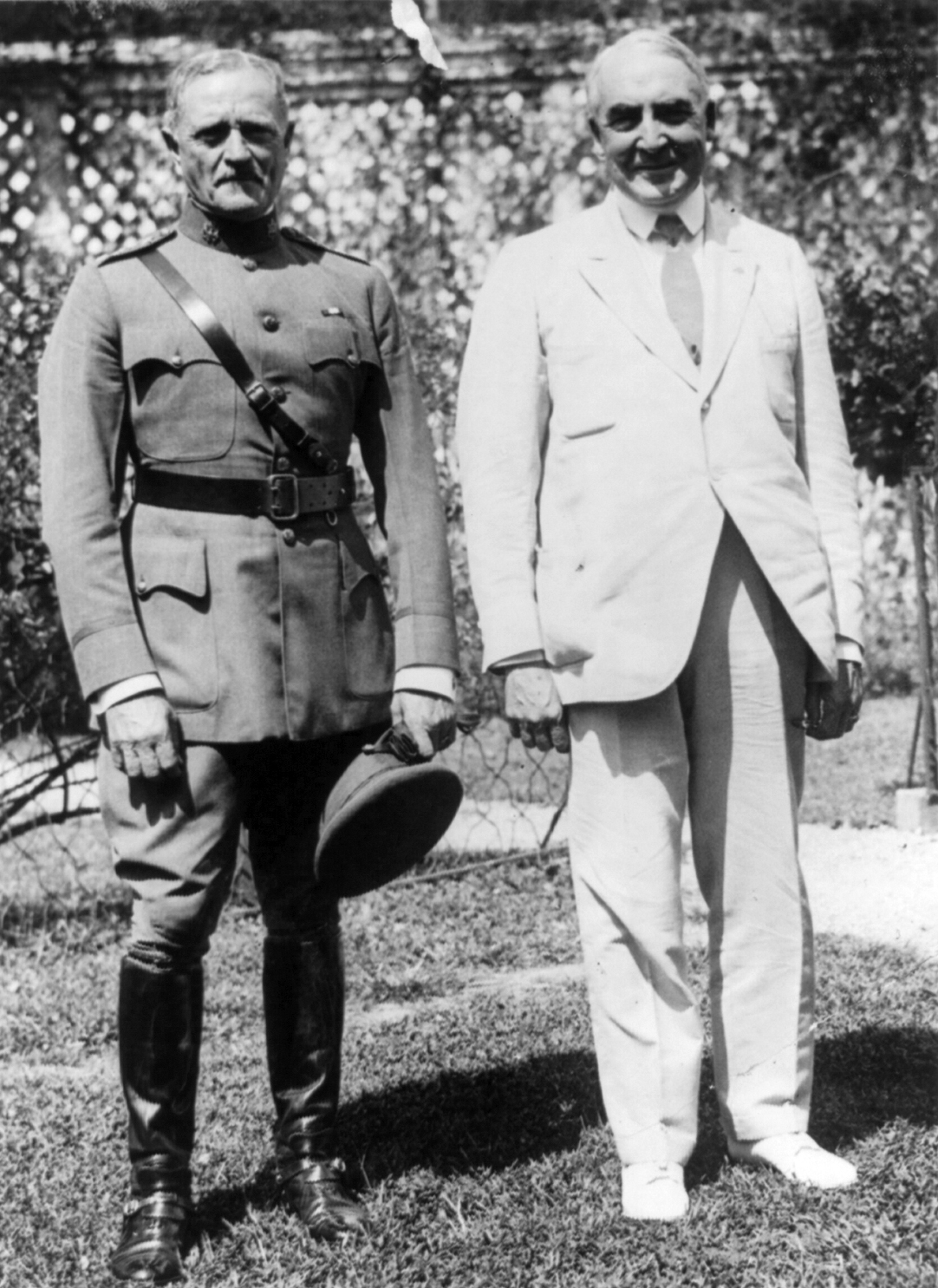
Harding with General John J. Pershing on August 30, 1921

- August 1 – Harding officiates the 300th anniversary celebration of the landing of the Pilgrims in Plymouth, Massachusetts.
- August 2 – Harding visits Portland, Maine, and Whitefield, New Hampshire, during his travels.
- August 3 – Harding arrives at Lancaster, New Hampshire, as a guest of Secretary of War John W. Weeks.
- August 5 – Harding visits an Army hospital in Gorham, New Hampshire.
- August 6 – Harding departs from New Hampshire to visit an Army hospital in Oxford, Maine, and return to Washington D.C.
- August 9 – Harding arrives Washington D.C. following his vacation and signs a soldiers' relief bill.
- August 11 – Harding adjourns a meeting after being informed that his 76-year-old father George Tryon Harding had suddenly married his own 52-year-old aide.
- August 14 – Harding travels to Baltimore with Attorney General Harry M. Daugherty to visit Daugherty's hospitalized wife.
- August 15 – Harding signs a proclamation declaring that the United States has been at peace with Germany since July 2. He also signs the Packers and Stockyards Act into law.
- August 19 – Harding declares his intention to merge the Department of War and the Department of the Navy.
- August 20 – Officials accompany Harding during an excursion to Chesapeake Bay on the USS Mayflower.
- August 24 – Harding signs the Future Trading Act into law.
- August 25 – The Battle of Blair Mountain begins in Logan County, West Virginia.
- August 30 – Harding gives an ultimatum to declare martial law if rioters do not disperse in West Virginia.

=== September 1921 ===
- September 2 – The U.S. Army arrives in West Virginia and ends the Battle of Blair Mountain, but Harding declines to declare martial law.
- September 5 – A vacation to Atlantic City, New Jersey, via the USS Mayflower is canceled due to bad weather.
- September 7 – Harding speaks about his peace initiatives at the Army academy.
- September 8 – Harding meets former Senator Elihu Root at the White House.
- September 9 – Colombia declares its support for a United-States-led society of nations instead of the League of Nations.
- September 10 – Harding names the American delegation to the Washington Naval Conference: Elihu Root, Charles Evans Hughes, Henry Cabot Lodge, and Oscar Underwood.
- September 10 – Harding takes the USS Mayflower to visit Philadelphia and Atlantic City.
- September 12 – Harding visits New York City and goes to the theater.
- September 15 – Harding speaks at West Point and departs from New York.
- September 17 – Harding visits Norfolk, Virginia, for a day of leisure before returning to Washington D.C.
- September 21 – Harding is briefed on the increased activity of the Ku Klux Klan.
- September 26 – Harding opens the 1921 Conference on Unemployment.
- September 30 – Harding adds a 128-acre donation of land from former Representative William Kent to the Muir Woods National Monument.

=== October 1921 ===
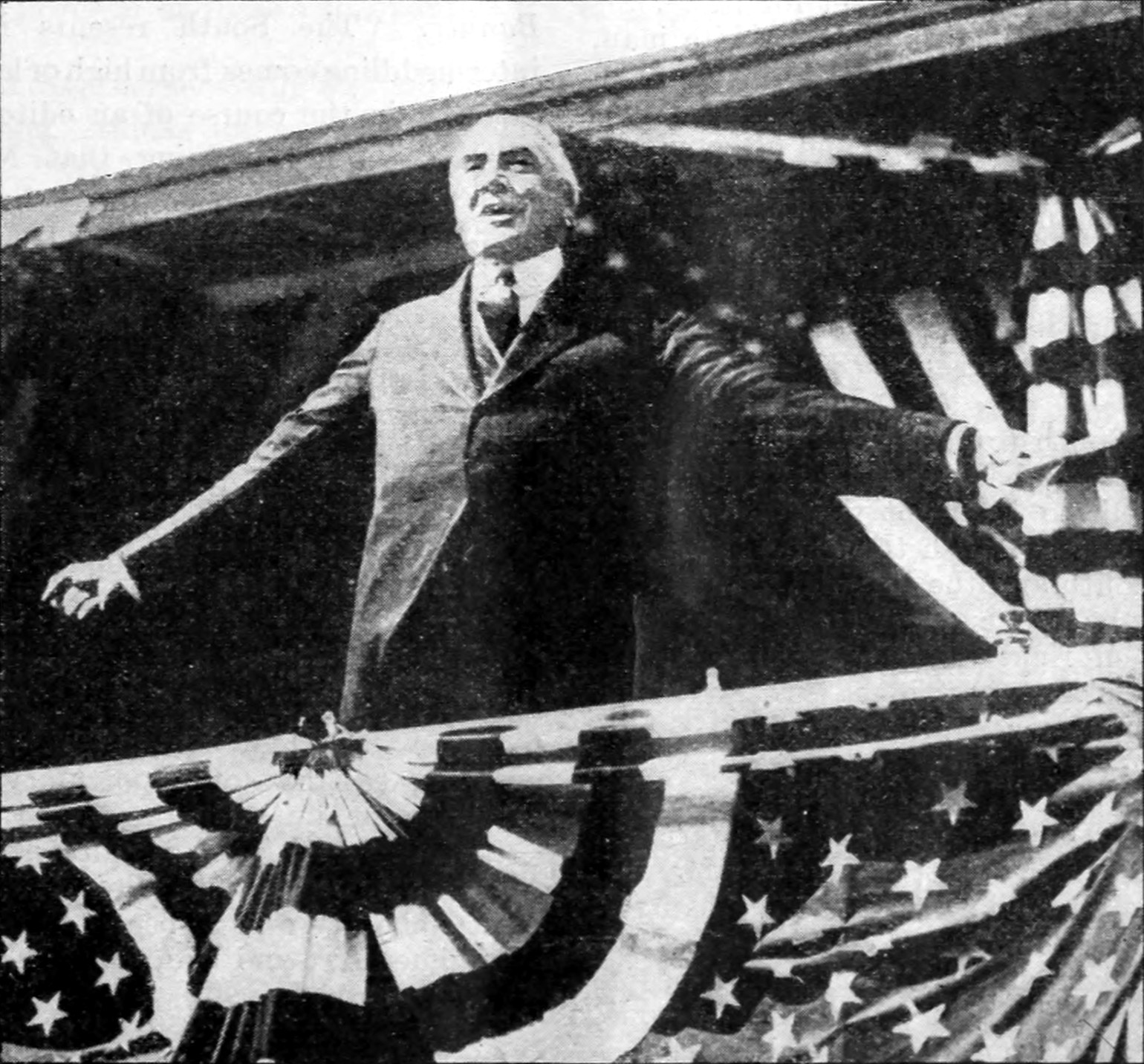
Harding speaks in Birmingham, Alabama on October 26, 1921.

- October 2 – Harding observes as marines engage in a mock battle in Virginia.
- October 3 – William Howard Taft is sworn in as Chief Justice of the United States.
- October 4 – Harding meets with representatives of the United Mine Workers to discuss imprisoned miners.
- October 12 – Harding hosts a reception for attendants of postmaster conventions in Washington.
- October 13 – The American delegation to the Washington Naval Conference begins meeting in preparation of the event.
- October 14 – Harding attends the funeral of Senator Philander C. Knox.
- October 18 – The federal government intervenes to prevent a nationwide railroad strike.
- October 19 – Harding speaks at the College of William & Mary where he receives an honorary doctorate of law.
- October 22 – Harding authorizes the Department of Justice to take action against a railroad walkout. He declines to use World War I era wartime powers that are still at his disposal.
- October 24 – Harding meets wartime heroes Armando Diaz, David Beatty, and Alphonse Jacques at the White House as they arrive for Armistice Day ceremonies.
- October 25 – Harding leaves to visit the Southern United States.
- October 26 – Harding gives a speech in favor of civil rights at the 50th anniversary of the founding of Birmingham, Alabama.
- October 27 – The anticipated rail strike is called off. Harding visits Atlanta.
- October 28 – Harding recommends to Congress the merger of the Railroad Labor Board and the Interstate Commerce Commission to prevent further threats of railroad shutdowns.
- October 29 – Harding welcomes Supreme Allied Commander Ferdinand Foch to Washington D.C.
- October 31 – Harding grants American disarmament delegates the rank of ambassador preceding the conference.

=== November 1921 ===
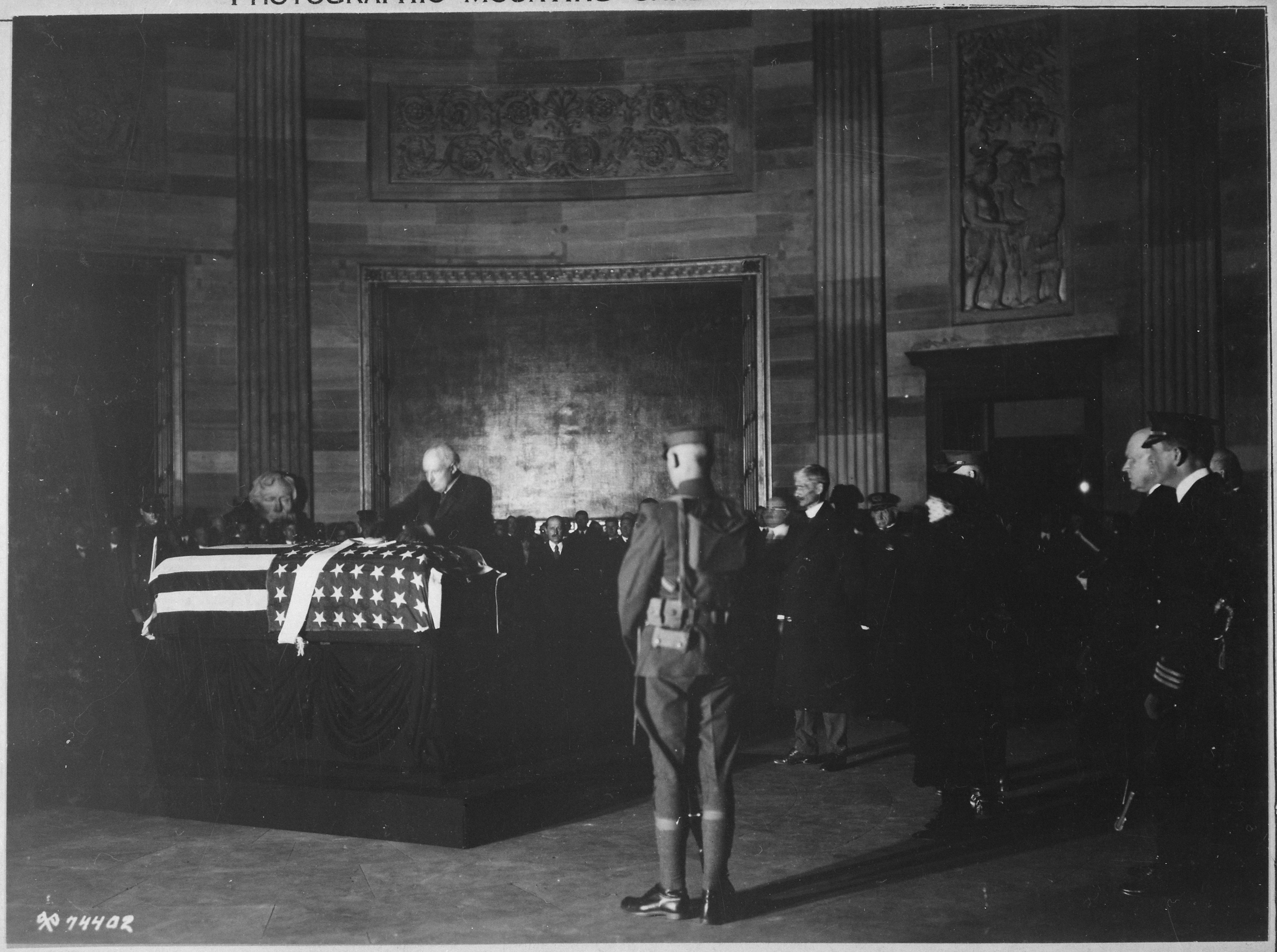
Harding places a wreath on the Tomb of the Unknown Soldier on November 9, 1921.

- November 2 – Harding declines to celebrate his birthday, but he receives congratulations from King George V of the United Kingdom.
- November 5 – Harding proclaims Armistice Day as a national holiday on November 11.
- November 8 – Harding receives French Prime Minister Aristide Briand as the French disarmament delegation arrives.
- November 11 – Harding dedicates the Tomb of the Unknown Soldier on Armistice Day.
- November 12 – The Washington Naval Conference begins.
- November 14 – Harding lays the corner stone for a World War I memorial in Washington, D.C.
- November 17 – The House votes in favor of a 50% income surtax rate, despite Harding's insistence of a compromise at 40%.
- November 23 – Harding signs the Revenue Act of 1921, the Willis–Campbell Act, and the Sheppard–Towner Act into law.
- November 26 – Harding proposes a looser collection of national conferences instead of the League of Nations.

=== December 1921 ===
- December 5 – Harding delivers a national budget to Congress.
- December 6 – Harding delivers the 1921 State of the Union Address.
- December 13 – The Four-Power Treaty is signed at the Washington Naval Conference.
- December 21 – Harding and the American delegation make conflicting statements about which territories of Japan pertain to the Four-Power Treaty.
- December 22 – Harding signs the Russian Famine Relief Act into law.
- December 23 – Harding commutes the prison sentences of Eugene V. Debs and other World War I seditionists.
- December 25 – Harding takes Christmas Day off, attending church and dining at the White House without guests.
- December 27 – Harding appoints Secretary of Commerce Herbert Hoover as chairman of the Colorado River Commission to reclaim arid land.
- December 28 – The Washington Naval Conference is hampered by France's insistence of maintaining a large fleet of submarines.
- December 30 – Harding orders Secretary of Agriculture Henry Cantwell Wallace to form a conference of agricultural leaders to address farm issues.
- December 31 – Harding orders that two Medal of Honor recipients have their Boston military jobs restored after being laid off.

== 1922 ==
=== January 1922 ===
- January 2 – Harding hosts the first White House New Year's reception in nine years.
- January 7 – Harding dines with cabinet members and Republican leadership at the White House.
- January 11 – Harding indicates support for soldier bonus bills but refuses to endorse any that does not provide a source of funding.
- January 13 – Harding calls several senators over the phone to campaign against the expulsion of Senator Truman Handy Newberry.
- January 16 – Harding agrees to the appointment of a farmer on the Federal Reserve Board after a meeting with Senator William S. Kenyon.
- January 18 – Harding speaks critically of the press reporting meticulously on the president's speech.
- January 21 – Harding requests funding for roads and post offices.
- January 23 – Harding opens the national agricultural conference.
- January 23 – It is announced that the United States will not participate in the world economic congress in Genoa.
- January 27 – Harding instructs several executive departments to offer work to the unemployed.
- January 27 – Harding opens an investigation into banks offering federal farm loans at illegal rates.
- January 30 – Harding requests a postponement of the annual Ohio Society banquet following the collapse of the Knickerbocker Theatre.
- January 30 – The White House puts out a statement opposing the reduction of Navy personnel to 50,000 men.
- January 31 – The United States arbitrates the Shandong Problem between Japan and China.

=== February 1922 ===
- February 3 – Harding lauds his administration's budget cuts while speaking to the government business organization.
- February 6 – The Washington Naval Conference ends and the Washington Naval Treaty is signed. Harding closes the conference with a speech.
- February 7 – Harding orders the suspension of work on Naval vessels.
- February 7 – Harding appoints diplomats to the Central Powers.
- February 8 – The White House's first radio is installed.
- February 9 – Harding signs the World War Foreign Debts Commission Act into law.
- February 9 – Harding hosts a reception for members of Congress at the White House.
- February 11 – Harding speaks on the Senate floor to urge the ratification of disarmament treaties.
- February 11 – Harding speaks at the Lincoln Dinner at the League of Republican State Clubs.
- February 14 – Harding receives the findings of a report on labor disputes at the New River coal mines.
- February 15 – Harding opposes a new tax for a bonus bill for soldiers and expresses doubt that it can be funded.
- February 16 – The Senate requests information from Harding regarding the signing of the Four-Power Treaty.
- February 16 – Harding delivers an ultimatum that the pending soldiers' bonus bill be funded with a sales tax.
- February 18 – Harding signs the Capper–Volstead Act into law.
- February 20 – Harding informs the Senate that there are no records of the deliberations before the drafting of the Four-Power Treaty.
- February 21 – Comedian Will Rogers is no longer welcome at the White House after making jokes at the administration's expense.
- February 23 – The White House postpones a military reception following the Roma disaster.
- February 24 – Harding and Senator Frank B. Brandegee compromise on an amendment to the Four-Power Treaty.
- February 25 – Harding meets with Congressmen at the White House to negotiate lower budget cuts for the Navy.
- February 28 – Harding addresses Congress to request funding for the Merchant Marine.

=== March 1922 ===
- March 3 – Postmaster General Will H. Hays resigns to serve as the chairman of the Motion Picture Producers and Distributors of America. He is replaced by Hubert Work.
- March 4 – Harding holds meetings with General John J. Pershing and members of the House Army Appropriation Subcommittee to discus army downsizing.
- March 4 – Harding declares his return to normalcy successful on the first anniversary of his inauguration.
- March 7 – Harding informs the Senate that the Lansing–Ishii Agreement is superseded by the Nine-Power Treaty.
- March 8 – Harding pays his income tax and departs from Washington by train to visit Florida.
- March 9 – Harding arrives in St. Augustine, Florida.
- March 10 – Harding boards the houseboat of The Washington Post editor Edward Beale McLean.
- March 14 – Harding's visit to the houseboat ends and he disembarks at Palm Beach, Florida.
- March 15 – Harding tours St. Augustine, Florida.
- March 18 – Harding departs for Washington D.C. by train.
- March 19 – Harding holds a conference to address the hospitalization of disabled veterans.
- March 20 – Harding orders that all remaining American soldiers in Germany are to be removed by July 1.
- March 20 – Harding signs the General Land Exchange Act of 1922 into law.
- March 27 – Harding signs a bill into law that restores the right to retirement to 80,000 government employees.
- March 28 – Harding breaks ground on the George Gordon Meade Memorial.
- March 29 – Harding declines to make stump speeches during the 1922 United States elections, instead opting to write letters in advance.
- March 31 – Harding faces accusations of restoring the spoils system after dismissing officials at the Bureau of Engraving and Printing. The action's legality is debated.

=== April 1922 ===
- April 1 – Harding orders the Department of Justice to prevent violence during the nationwide strike.
- April 3 – A special House committee opens an investigation into Harding's dismissal of officials at the Bureau of Engraving and Printing.
- April 4 – The House Appropriation Committee informs Harding that they intend to reduce the Naval enlisted strength to 67,000 despite the president's instance of 80,000-85,000.
- April 7 – Secretary of the Interior Albert B. Fall leases oil reserves to businessman Harry Ford Sinclair in what would become the Teapot Dome scandal.
- April 8 – Harding is said to support a proposed Constitutional amendment limiting the presidency to a single six-year term.
- April 11 – The Senate Finance Committee presents a revised tariff bill incorporating Harding's recommendations.
- April 14 – The Wall Street Journal breaks the story that the Secretary of the Interior had leased oil reserves to a private company.
- April 15 – Senator John B. Kendrick introduces a resolution to investigate the leasing of oil reserves by Secretary of the Interior Albert B. Fall.
- April 15 – Harding's demand of an enlisted Naval force of 86,000 is incorporated into a military appropriations bill.
- April 17 – Charges are filed against Senator Joseph I. France for engaging with a foreign government without going through the Department of State.
- April 18 – Harding endorses the development of the Naval oil reserve at the Teapot Dome by the Sinclair Oil Company, so long as it "does business honestly". This decision would later be the focus of the Teapot Dome scandal.
- April 22 – Harding attends the Gridiron Club dinner.
- April 27 – Harding attends a ceremony in Point Pleasant, Ohio, for the centennial of former President Ulysses S. Grant's birth. Harding orders government offices to be closed in Grant's honor.
- April 29 – Harding meets Lord and Lady Astor at the White House.
- April 29 – Harding takes the position against adopting daylight saving time.

=== May 1922 ===
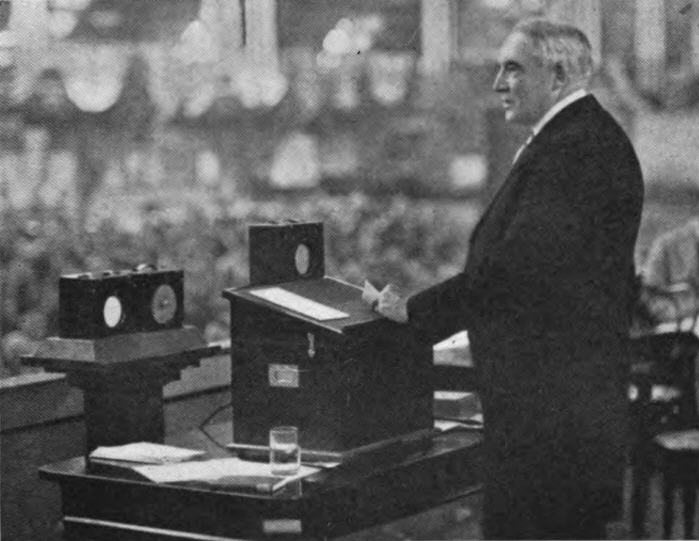
Harding's speech is broadcast over radio on May 18, 1922.

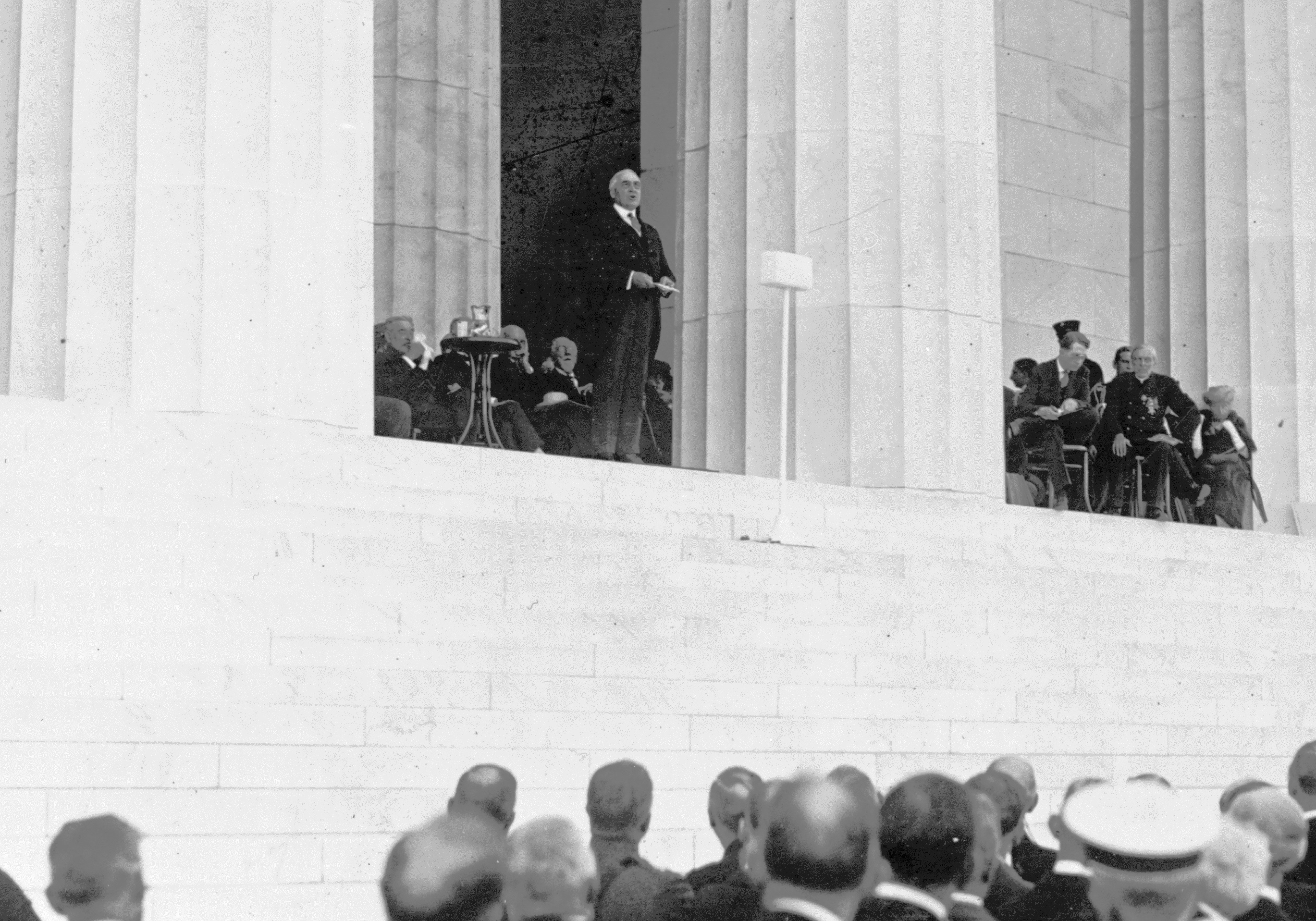
Harding dedicates the Lincoln Memorial on May 30, 1922.

- May 2 – The White House states that Harding would not be influenced by the picketing of the Children's Crusade.
- May 4 – Harding is awakened early in the morning due to a fire in the nearby Treasury Building.
- May 5 – Harding requests $500,000 from Congress to investigate fraud cases pertaining to World War I.
- May 6 – Senate Republican leadership presents the most recent version of the Soldiers' Bonus Bill to Harding.
- May 12 – Harding travels to New Jersey where he will be the guest of Senator Walter Evans Edge. He speaks to the New Jersey Women's Club in Atlantic City.
- May 14 – Harding returns to Washington D.C. from New Jersey.
- May 15 – Harding meets with Senator Reed Smoot to discuss an alternate draft of the soldiers' bonus bill.
- May 15 – Harding requests that the United States Shipping Board refrain from renaming the SS Leviathan after him, as they had intended to do.
- May 18 – Secretary of Commerce Herbert Hoover meets with coal field operators on Hoover's behalf to negotiate prices.
- May 18 – Harding's speech to the Chamber of Commerce is broadcast over radio, the first such broadcast of a presidential speech.
- May 18 – Harding meets with steel industry leaders to negotiate an end to the 12-hour workday.
- May 20 – Harding meets with rail industry leaders to negotiate prices.
- May 21 – Harding cancels his attendance to the dedication of the new National Women's Party headquarters.
- May 26 – Harding signs the Narcotic Drugs Import and Export Act into law.
- May 27 – Harding and his company embark on the USS Mayflower.
- May 28 – Harding authorizes an eight-hour workday for postal workers.
- May 29 – Harding makes a surprise appearance at the Naval Academy.
- May 30 – Harding dedicates the Lincoln Memorial.

=== June 1922 ===
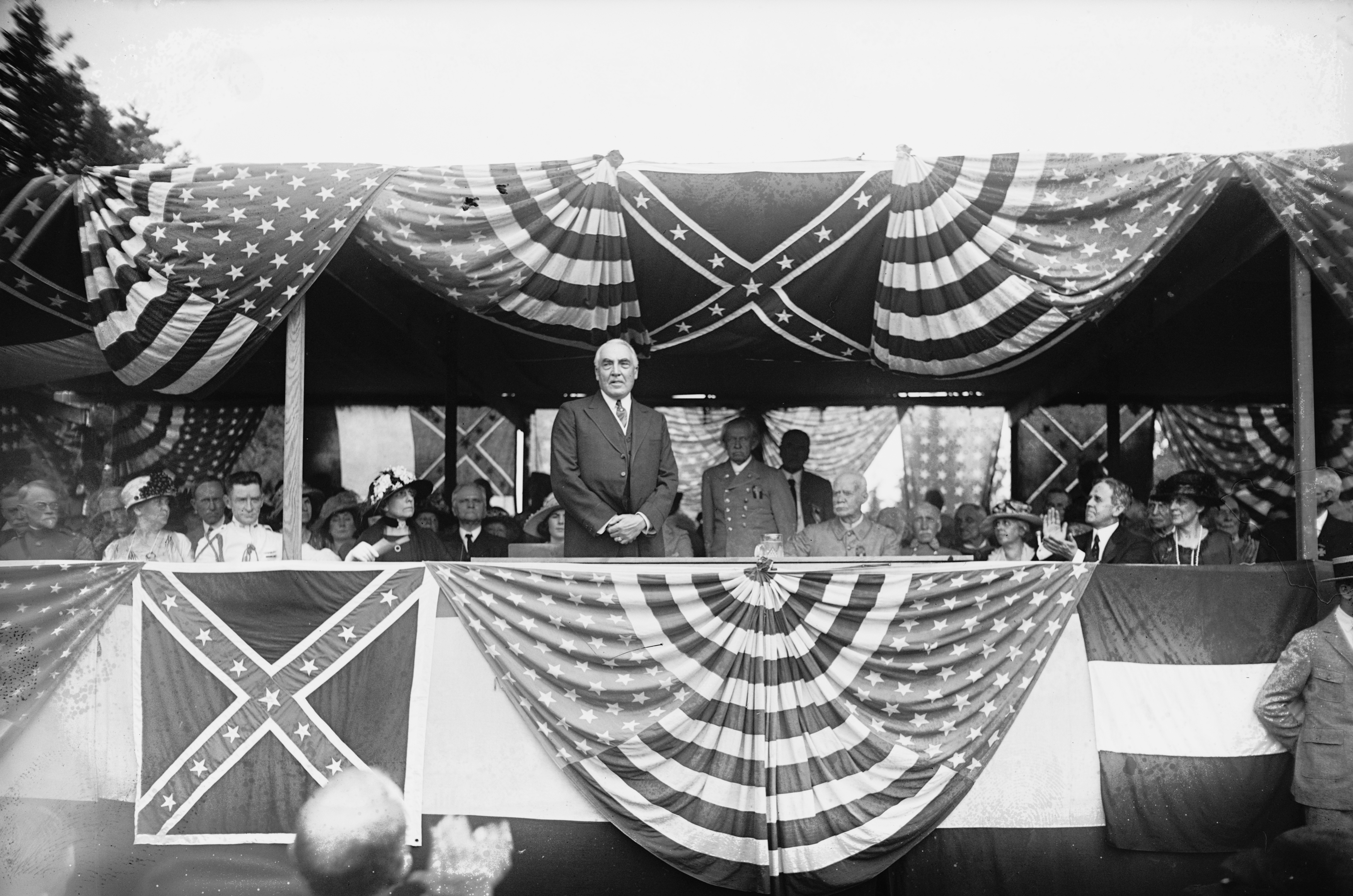
Harding speaking to Confederate veterans on June 5, 1922

- June 3 – Harding accompanies 700 schoolchildren from the White House to the Lincoln Memorial where they perform a concert in his honor.
- June 3 – Senator Augustus Owsley Stanley accuses Harding on the Senate floor of stifling the press to prevent criticism of Attorney General Harry M. Daugherty.
- June 4 – Harding makes a surprise appearance and gives a speech at the Arlington National Cemetery during a tribute to Civil War veterans.
- June 8 – Harding arrives in Somerville, New Jersey.
- June 9 – Harding dedicates the Princeton Battle Monument.
- June 9 – Harding departs for Washington D.C. after giving a speech at the train station against the return of pre-war wages.
- June 10 – Harding signs the Joint Service Pay Readjustment Act into law.
- June 10 – Harding attends the wedding of the daughter of the Secretary of State.
- June 13 – Harding informs the House that he will call a special session of Congress if a ship subsidy bill is not passed.
- June 14 – The Department of the Navy opens an investigation into a case of antisemitism in the Naval Academy.
- June 14 – Harding dedicates the Francis Scott Key Monument in Baltimore.
- June 17 – Harding meets Representative Philip P. Campbell at the White House to negotiate the ship subsidy bill.
- June 17 – Republican Congressional leadership indicate they may request the resignation of Secretary of the Interior Albert B. Fall due to his encroachment on the Department of Agriculture.
- June 19 – Harding agrees to postpone Congressional action on the ship subsidy bill.
- June 19 – Harding reviews Marine marches at the White House.
- June 21 – Senate allies of Harding block the advancement of the soldiers' bonus bill.
- June 22 – Striking coal miners in Herrin, Illinois, begin to murder their opposition during the Herrin massacre.
- June 22 – Harding denies Filipino requests of independence and defers further action to Congress.
- June 23 – Harding announces that the federal government will intervene in coal strikes to prevent further acts of violence.
- June 24 – Harding expresses his support for cabinet secretaries to give their own opinions independently of the administration, responding to criticisms of Secretary of War John W. Weeks.
- June 24 – Harding travels to the home of Edward Beale McLean in Virginia.
- June 26 – Harding meets with United Mine Workers president John L. Lewis.

=== July 1922 ===
- July 1 – The Great Railroad Strike of 1922 begins.
- July 1 – Harding oversees a Civil War reenactment by the Marines in Gettysburg, Pennsylvania.
- July 1 – Harding orders the return of contracts and property given to the Chemical Foundation Inc. by the Woodrow administration.
- July 1 – Harding begins holding negotiations to facilitate and end of the coal strike.
- July 3 – The Railroad Labor Board determines that the Great Railroad Strike had been conducted improperly and revokes rights of the offending unions.
- July 4 – Harding celebrates Independence Day in his hometown of Marion, Ohio, following the city's centennial.
- July 6 – Harding departs from Marion, Ohio, on route to Washington D.C.
- July 8 – Harding returns to Washington D.C. from Marion, Ohio.
- July 10 – Harding delivers his arbitration plan to coal miners and operators.
- July 11 – Harding declares that rail service will continue and will be enforced by federal troops if necessary.
- July 12 – Harding meets Prime Minister of Canada William Lyon Mackenzie King at the White House.
- July 15 – The United Mine Workers reject Harding's attempt to negotiate an end to the coal strike.
- July 17 – The United States and Japan reach an agreement over the island of Yap.
- July 18 – Harding orders that the coal strike is to end immediately, enforced by state and federal troops.
- July 22 – Harding meets with the Chairman of the Railroad Labor Board and senators of the Senate Interstate Commerce Committee.
- July 22 – Chile and Peru sign an agreement in Washington D.C. to settle the Tacna-Arica dispute following 10 weeks of negotiations facilitated by the United States.
- July 28 – The United States recognizes the independence of Albania, Estonia, Latvia, and Lithuania.
- July 30 – Harding delivers his arbitration plan to rail workers and operators.
- July 31 – The federal government assumes authority of coal distribution to address the shortage caused by striking miners.

=== August 1922 ===
- August 2 – Rail strikers accept Harding's arbitration plan while rail operators reject it.
- August 11 – The Senate votes to give Harding authority over flexible tariff rates.
- August 13 – Rail strikers reject Harding's mediation of the strike.
- August 15 – An agreement is reached to reopen bituminous coal mines.
- August 18 – Harding addresses Congress regarding ongoing railroad and coal strikes.
- August 21 – Harding speaks in favor of military strength and readiness while reviewing student soldiers at Fort Meade.
- August 23 – The Harding administration begins drafting legislation to regulate coal prices.
- August 27 – Harding meets with Chairman of the Senate Interstate Commerce Committee, Senator Albert B. Cummins, to discuss legislation that would give Harding authority over mines.
- August 28 – Members of Congress object to Harding's intention of seizing coal mines.
- August 29 – Harding authorizes $600,000 in funds to build the Wilson Dam.

=== September 1922 ===
- September 1 – Harding meets with Alien Property Custodian Thomas W. Miller at the White House.
- September 2 – Harding facilitates an end to the anthracite coal strikes, bringing the national coal strikes to an end.
- September 5 – Harding nominates former Senator George Sutherland to the Supreme Court.
- September 7 – First Lady Florence Harding falls seriously ill.
- September 9 – Harding suspends all presidential duties to tend to his ailing wife.
- September 10 – Harding meets former President Woodrow Wilson at the White House.
- September 12 – Florence Harding's condition is determined to be stable.
- September 13 – An agreement is reached to end the rail strike.
- September 18 – Harding meets with veterans' organization leaders to hear arguments in favor of the bonus bill.
- September 19 – Harding vetoes the World War Adjusted Compensation Act bonus bill.
- September 17 – Harding approves the promotions of six generals and 13 colonels.
- September 21 – The Senate sustains Harding's veto of the bonus bill.
- September 21 – Harding signs the Fordney–McCumber Tariff into law.
- September 22 – Harding signs the Cable Act into law.
- September 29 – Harding's father George T. Harding endorses a Democrat for Iowa's Senate race.

=== October 1922 ===
- October 1 – Harding orders the creation of a White House Police Force.
- October 6 – Harding orders the ban of alcohol on ships in American water and on American ships abroad.
- October 6 – Harding names a fact finding commission to address issues in the coal industry.
- October 7 – Enforcement of the alcohol ban on ships is delayed until October 14.
- October 9 – Harding authorizes the creation of an emergency fund to support refugees in Turkey following the Burning of Smyrna.
- October 13 – Harding warns Congress that he will challenge any pork barrel legislation in the upcoming session.
- October 14 – Enforcement of the alcohol ban on ships is further delayed until October 21.
- October 16 – American forces land in Fuzhou alongside British and Japanese forces to maintain order during the fighting of the Warlord Era.
- October 18 – The inquiry of the Federal Finding Coal Commission begins following the appointment of John Hays Hammond as chairman.
- October 22 – Harding establishes a commission to support refugees in Turkey, with former Postmaster General Will H. Hays appointed as chairman.
- October 24 – Harding rejects calls from the American Legion to order the resignation of General Charles E. Sawyer.
- October 30 – A new labor dispute begins in the rail industry after the Railroad Labor Board warns of the risks of raising wages.

=== November 1922 ===
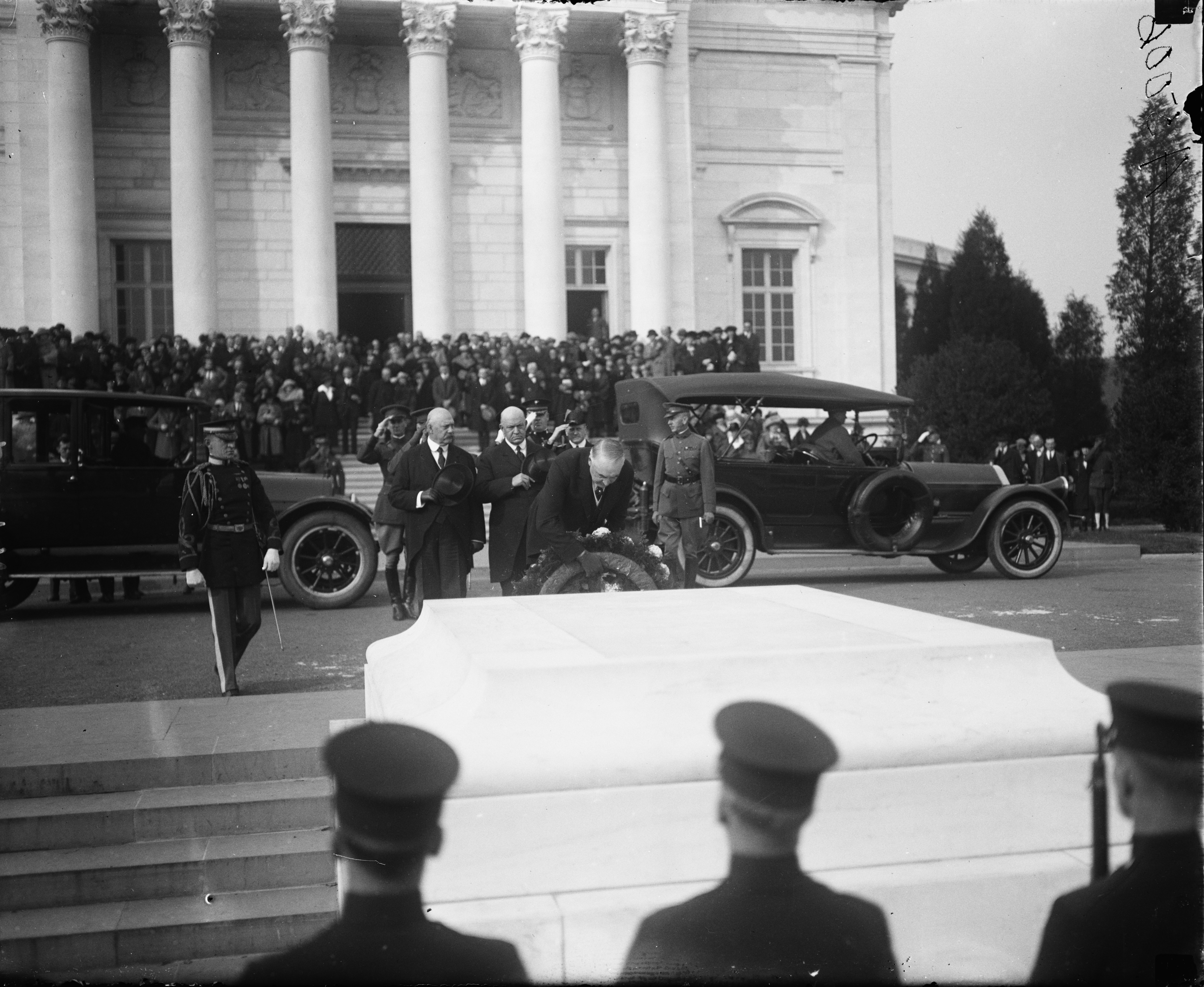
Harding places a wreath on the Tomb of the Unknown Soldier on November 11, 1922.

- November 7 – Republicans hold both chambers of Congress in the 1922 United States elections.
- November 10 – Harding declares November 12 to be Red Cross Sunday and makes a plea for Americans to support the group.
- November 11 – Harding places a wreath on the Tomb of the Unknown Soldier in honor of Armistice Day.
- November 17 – Harding denies rumors that he has taken an anti-prohibition stance.
- November 20 – Harding assures federal support if Ku Klux Klan violence becomes a problem in Louisiana.
- November 20 – Harding convenes Congress in a special session.
- November 21 – Harding addresses Congress to request the immediate passage of a ship subsidy bill.
- November 23 – Harding nominates Pierce Butler as an Associate Justice of the Supreme Court.
- November 24 – The Harding administration names the enforcement of prohibition as its next priority.
- November 25 – Florence Harding is gifted a canary to be kept in the White House as she recovers from her illness.
- November 29 – Harding recommends that the states address the Ku Klux Klan, threatening federal intervention if federal interests are made at stake.

=== December 1922 ===
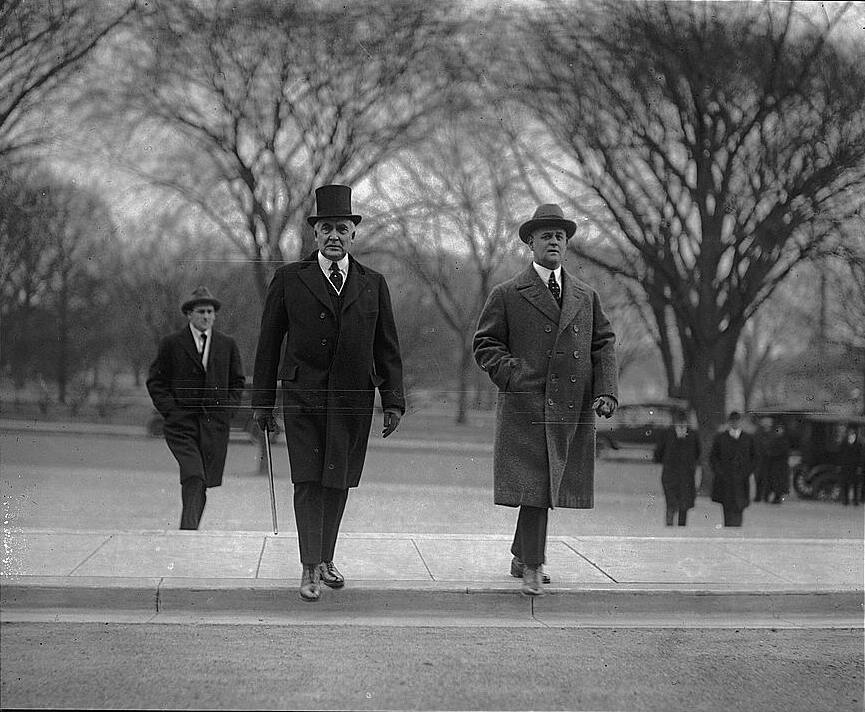
Harding outside the Red Cross on December 13, 1922

- December 1 – Harding makes a statement in favor of ending the 12-hour work day.
- December 4 – Harding delivers a preliminary 1923 budget to Congress, declaring that the need for a wartime budget has ended.
- December 4 – The United States hosts a peace conference between Nicaragua, Costa Rica, Guatemala, El Salvador, and Honduras.
- December 4 – The nomination of Pierce Butler to the Supreme Court is blocked by the Senate.
- December 5 – Harding renominates Pierce Butler to the Supreme Court.
- December 5 – Harding meets with former Prime Minister of France Georges Clemenceau in the White House to hear a case for increased American involvement in Europe.
- December 5 – Harding opposes a proposed constitutional amendment to abolish the Electoral College.
- December 8 – Harding delivers the 1922 State of the Union Address.
- December 12 – Hearings begin for the impeachment of Attorney General Harry M. Daugherty.
- December 13 – Harding opens the annual American Red Cross board meeting.
- December 18 – Harding hosts a meeting of 14 state governors to discuss the enforcement of prohibition.
- December 21 – Assistant Secretary of the Navy Theodore Roosevelt Jr. reports to Harding that the US Navy is unfit to use in war.
- December 21 – Pierce Butler is confirmed by the Senate as an Associate Justice of the Supreme Court.
- December 24 – Harding objects to a provision in the Naval appropriations bill that would require him to convene a world conference on the economy.
- December 25 – President Harding and the First Lady tend to Christmas gifts received by the White House, but no festivities are held due to Florence Harding's illness.
- December 30 – Harding commutes the sentences of eight members of the Industrial Workers of the World that had been convicted of espionage charges.

== 1923 ==
=== January 1923 ===
- January 3 – Harding vetoes the Bursum Bill that would provide pensions to military widows.
- January 3–8 – Harding holds extended discussions at the White House with Ambassador to the United Kingdom George Harvey to discuss the issue of World War I debts.
- January 10 – Harding orders the end of American occupation in Germany.
- January 12 – Harding nominates Comptroller of the Currency Daniel Richard Crissinger as Chair of the Federal Reserve.
- January 17 – Harding cancels all of his appointments for the next few days due to illness.
- January 19 – A man from Cleveland is arrested for mailing a death threat to Harding and signing it as his wife.
- January 24 – Harding nominates Edward Terry Sanford to the Supreme Court.
- January 29 – Edward Terry Sanford is confirmed as an Associate Justice of the Supreme Court.
- January 31 – The United Kingdom agrees to the American plan for repayment of World War I debts.

=== February 1923 ===
- February 7 – Harding delivers to Congress the World War I debt plan negotiated with the United Kingdom.
- February 13 – Harding expresses approval of a plan to consolidate the Department of War and the Department of the Navy under a Department of Defense.
- February 16 – Director of the Veterans Bureau Charles R. Forbes offers his resignation effective February 28.
- February 19 – Harding nominates Senator Miles Poindexter as Ambassador to Peru following the Senator's reelection defeat.
- February 22 – Harding meets with Brigadier General Frank T. Hines at the White House.
- February 24 – Harding requests that the Senate authorize American membership of the World Court.
- February 27 – Harding nominates Frank T Hines as Director of the Veterans Bureau, Hubert Work as Secretary of the Interior, and Senator Harry Stewart New as the Secretary of the Post.
- February 28 – Harding signs the British debt agreement into law.

=== March 1923 ===
- March 2 – Brigadier General Frank T. Hines takes office as Director of the Veterans Bureau.
- March 5 – Harding departs on a train to Florida.
- March 6 – Harding's train arrives in Ormond Beach, Florida.
- March 10 – Harding travels to Palm Beach, Florida, by houseboat.
- March 17 – Harding's candidacy in the 1924 United States presidential election is announced.
- March 23 – Harding travels to St. Augustine, Florida, by houseboat, stopping in Titusville, Florida, and Daytona Beach, Florida.
- March 28 – Harding opens an investigation into the manipulation of sugar prices.

=== April 1923 ===
- April 1 – Harding arrives in Augusta, Georgia, by train.
- April 7 – Harding departs from Augusta, Georgia, to return to Washington D.C.
- April 16 – Harding speaks to the Daughters of the American Revolution in the Memorial Continental Hall.
- April 21 – Harding meets with British MP Robert Cecil at the White House.
- April 24 – Harding travels to New York and gives a speech in favor of the World Court to the Associated Press.
- April 26 – Harding orders a halt on Naval modernization to avoid diplomatic conflict with the United Kingdom.

=== May 1923 ===
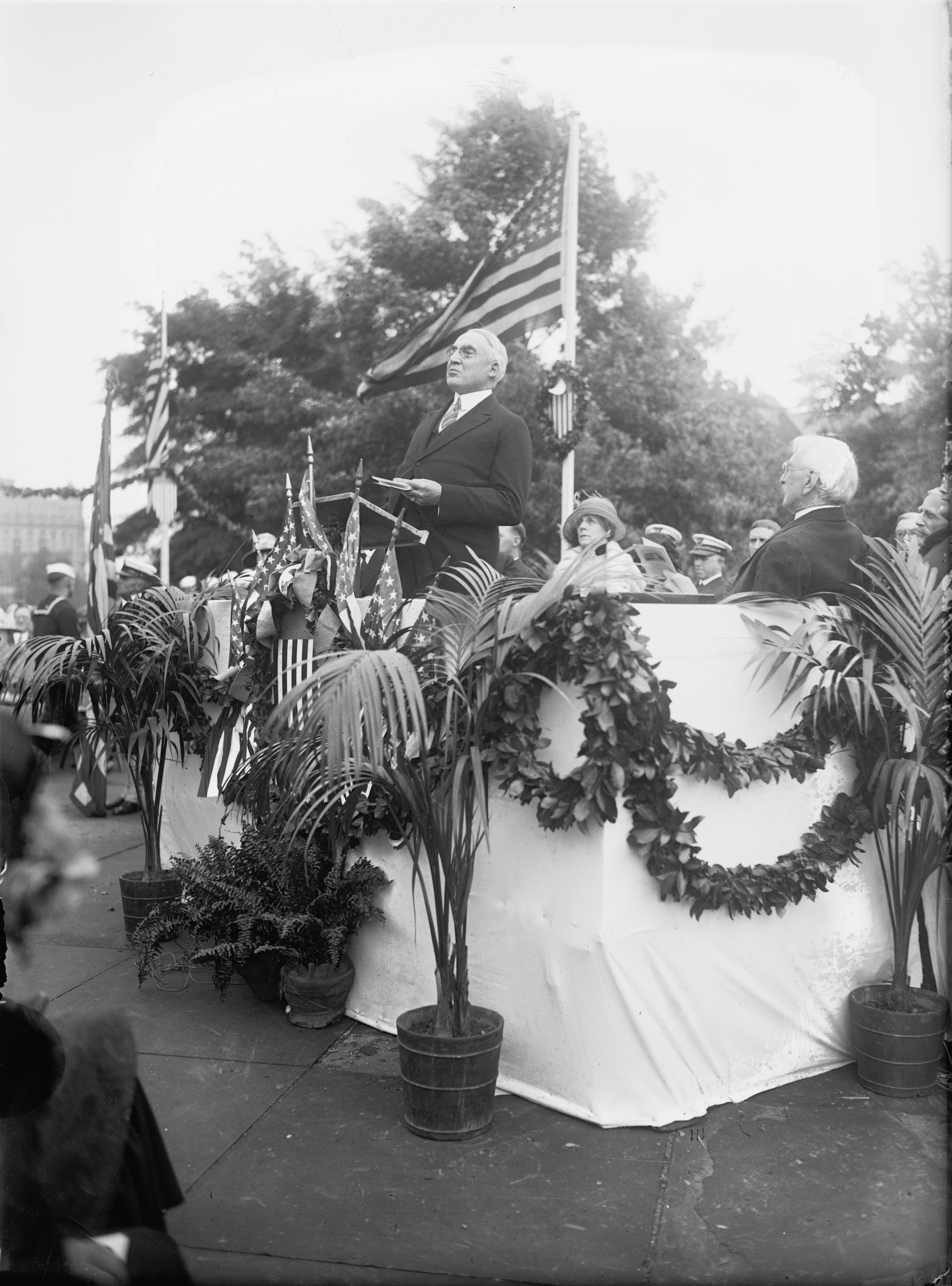
Harding dedicates a statue of Alexander Hamilton on May 17, 1923.

- May 1 – Harding expresses support for the 1923 sugar boycott.
- May 17 – Harding dedicates a monument to founding father Alexander Hamilton.
- May 28 – Attorney General Harry M. Daugherty declares that it is legal for women to wear pants and that they could not be banned from doing so.
- May 30 – Harding speaks at Arlington National Cemetery for Memorial Day.

=== June 1923 ===
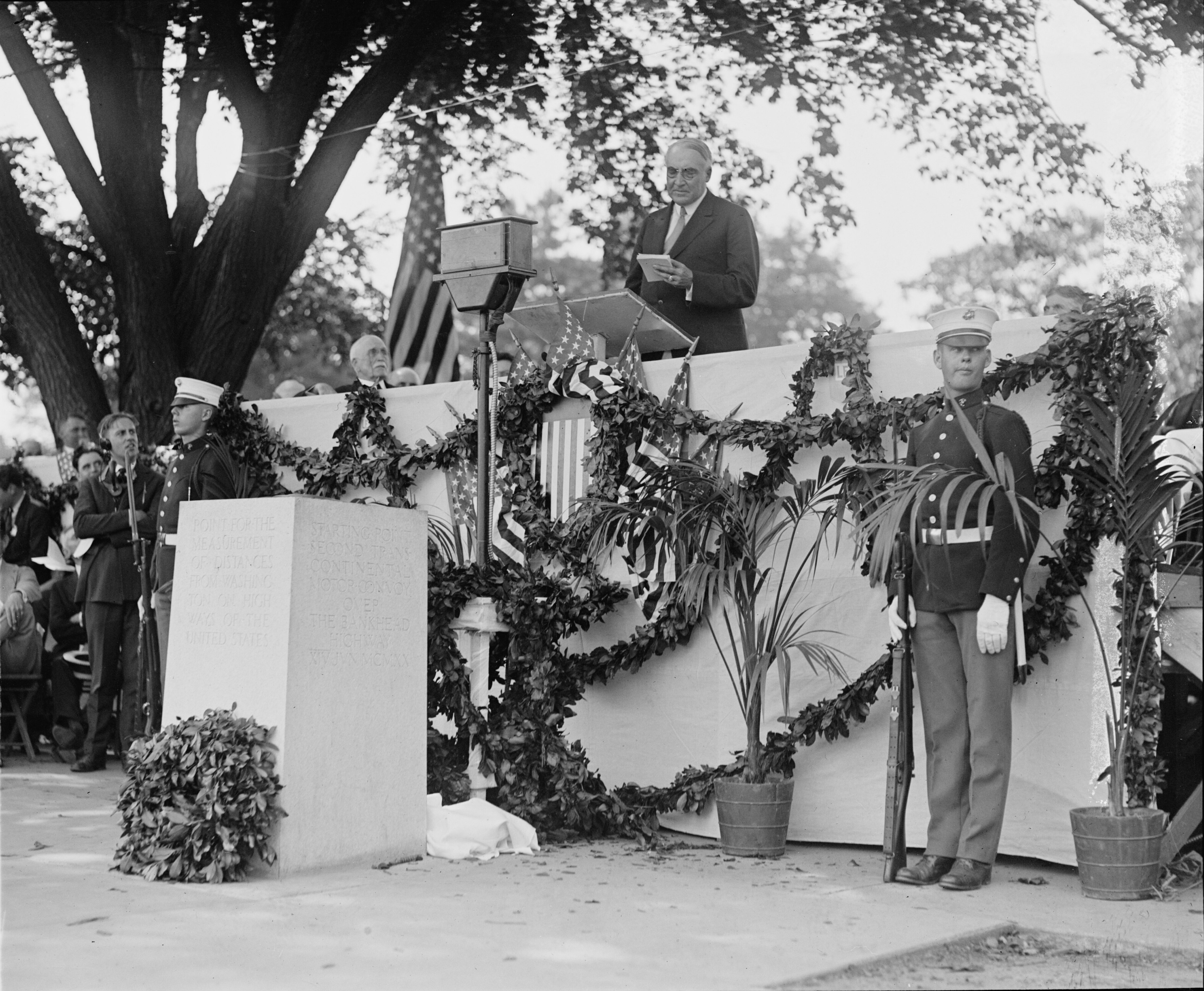
Harding dedicates the Zero Milestone on June 4, 1923.

- June 4 – Harding dedicates the Zero Milestone and gives a speech in favor of national highways.
- June 5 – Harding speaks at the opening session of the Ancient Arabic Order Of The Nobles Of The Mystic Shrine, advocating the end of war.
- June 9 – Harding speaks to the Young Men's Republican Club in Wilmington, Delaware.
- June 12 – Harding authorizes a $600,000 trial trip for the SS Leviathan.
- June 13 – Harding meets ambassadors George Harvey and Henry P. Fletcher at the White House.
- June 14 – Harding speaks to the American Legion in the Continental Memorial Hall for Flag Day, declaring his wish that Americans learn the lyrics to "The Star Spangled Banner".
- June 20 – Harding relinquishes control of The Marion Star.
- June 20 – Harding embarks on the Voyage of Understanding.
- June 21 – Harding speaks in favor of the World Court in St. Louis.
- June 22 – Harding speaks in Kansas City, Missouri.
- June 23 – Harding speaks in Hutchinson, Kansas.
- June 24 – Harding speaks in Denver, Colorado. Three men accompanying him are killed in a car accident.
- June 25 – Harding speaks in Cheyenne, Wyoming.
- June 26 – Harding speaks in Salt Lake City, Utah.
- June 27 – Harding visits Zion National Park.
- June 28 – Harding speaks in Pocatello, Idaho, and Idaho Falls, Idaho.
- June 29 – Harding speaks in Butte, Montana, and Helena, Montana.
- June 30 – Harding visits Yellowstone National Park.

=== July 1923 ===
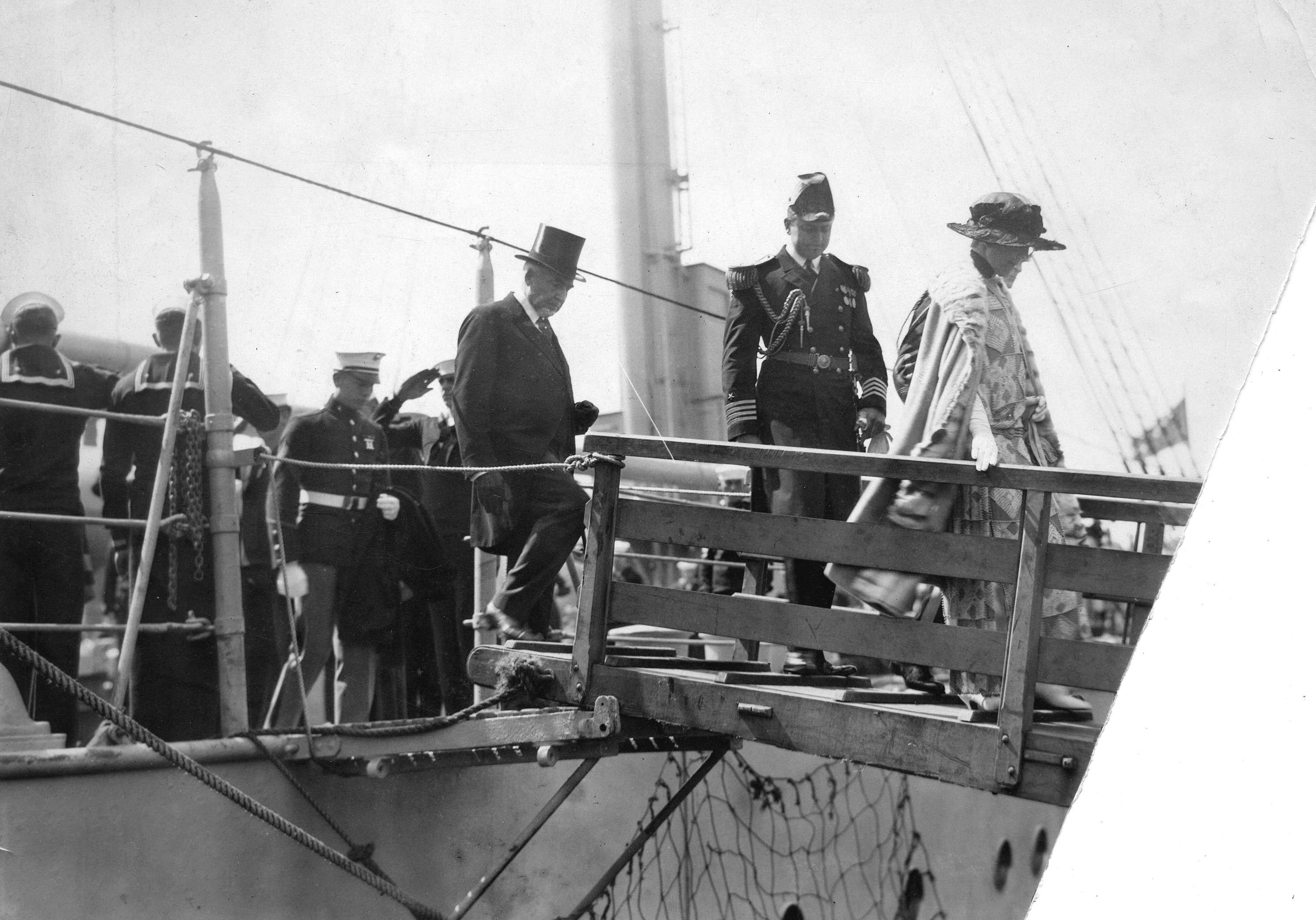
Harding becomes the first US president to visit Canada on July 26, 1923.

- July 2 – Harding speaks in Spokane, Washington.
- July 3 – Harding speaks in Meacham, Oregon.
- July 4 – Harding speaks in Portland, Oregon.
- July 5 – Harding embarks on the USS Henderson to Alaska.
- July 8 – Harding lands in Metlakatla, Alaska, and visits Ketchikan, Alaska.
- July 10 – Harding visits Juneau, Alaska.
- July 11 – Harding visits Skagway, Alaska, and passes the Muir Glacier.
- July 13 – Harding visits Seward, Alaska.
- July 14 – Harding visits Anchorage, Alaska.
- July 15 – Harding drives the final spike into the Alaska Railroad in Nenana, Alaska.
- July 16 – Harding visits Fairbanks, Alaska.
- July 18 – Harding returns to Seward for a fishing trip.
- July 19 – Harding visits Valdez, Alaska.
- July 20 – Harding visits Cordova, Alaska.
- July 22 – Harding visits Sitka, Alaska.
- July 25 – Harding goes fishing in Campbell River, British Columbia.
- July 26 – Harding visits Vancouver, British Columbia.
- July 27 – Harding speaks in Seattle about the future of Alaska.
- July 28 – Harding cancels stops on his trip due to illness.

=== August 1923 ===
- August 2 – Harding dies in San Francisco at the age of 57. Vice President Calvin Coolidge is inaugurated as the 30th president of the United States.

== See also ==
- Timeline of the Woodrow Wilson presidency, for his predecessor
- Timeline of the Calvin Coolidge presidency, for his successor
