= 1911 State of the Union Address =

1911 speech by U.S. president William Howard Taft

- Date: December 5–21, 1911
- Venue: House Chamber, United States Capitol
- Location: Washington, D.C.; 38°53′23″N 77°00′32″W
- Type: State of the Union Address
- Theme: Written
- Participants: William H. Taft; Augustus O. Bacon; Frank B. Brandegee; Jacob H. Gallinger; Champ Clark
- Format: Written
- Previous: 1910 State of the Union Address
- Next: 1912 State of the Union Address

The 1911 State of the Union Address was given by William Howard Taft, the 27th President of the United States. The address was given in four parts on December 5, 7, 20, and 21. The first part was about antitrust laws, specifically converting a Supreme Court decision about the various tobacco companies in the nation, the second part was about the United States’ foreign relations, the third part contained a report of his Tariff Board, and the fourth part was about the financial situation of the country. Taft said of the country's situation, "The financial condition of the government... was very satisfactory." Taft also stated that the surplus of money the country had gained was $47,237,377.10, approximately $1.15 billion in 2024.
