= 1912 State of the Union Address =

Speech by US President William Howard Taft

- Date: December 3, 1912
- Venue: House Chamber, United States Capitol
- Location: Washington, D.C.; 38°53′23″N 77°00′32″W
- Type: State of the Union Address
- Participants: William H. Taft; Augustus O. Bacon; Frank B. Brandegee; Jacob H. Gallinger; Champ Clark
- Format: Written
- Previous: 1911 State of the Union Address
- Next: 1913 State of the Union Address

The 1912 State of the Union Address was given on Tuesday, December 3, 1912. It was written by William H. Taft, the 27th president of the United States. He stated, "The position of the United States in the moral, intellectual, and material relations of the family of nations should be a matter of vital interest to every patriotic citizen." He said, "Our small Army now consists of 83,809 men, excluding the 5,000 Philippine scouts. Leaving out of consideration the Coast Artillery force, whose position is fixed in our various seacoast defenses, and the present garrisons of our various insular possessions, we have to-day within the continental United States a mobile Army of only about 35,000 men. This little force must be still further drawn upon to supply the new garrisons for the great naval base which is being established at Pearl Harbor, in the Hawaiian Islands, and to protect the locks now rapidly approaching completion at Panama."

From a foreign affairs standpoint, the President commented on the increasing self-determination of the Philippine people including the establishment of schools for the benefit of the local population. Additionally, the President commented on the Panama Canal Act, passed in 1912.

In domestic affairs, the President mentions the construction of the Lincoln Memorial and the President recommended the project's prompt approval.

Preceded by 1911 State of the Union Address	State of the Union addresses 1912	Succeeded by 1913 State of the Union Address
