= United States Oval Office Address =

Speech by the President of the United States

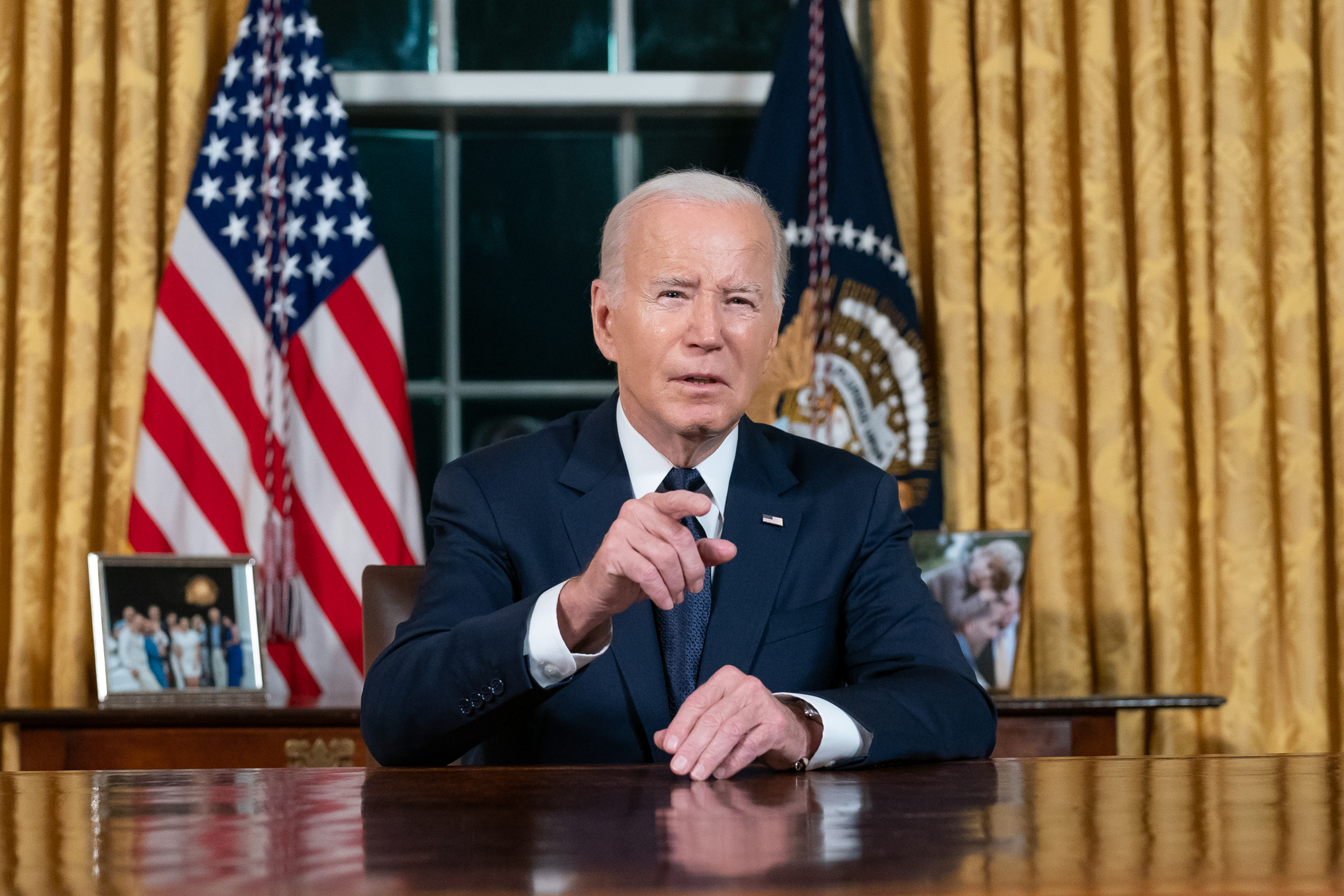
President Joe Biden addresses the nation about the response to the October 7 attacks in Israel and Russia's ongoing war on Ukraine, Thursday, October 19, 2023, in the Oval Office.

An Oval Office address is a type of speech made by the president of the United States, usually but not always in the Oval Office at the White House. It is considered among the most solemn settings for an address made by a leader, and is most often delivered to announce a major new policy initiative, on the occasion of a leader's departure from office, or during times of national emergency (natural disaster, war, etc.).

On occasions of national interest, U.S. presidents may decide to speak to the American people directly. Often in addresses to the nation, the president speaks directly into the camera and begins with the phrase, "My fellow Americans...".

== Use of the Oval Office ==
Presidents have used addresses in the Oval Office of the White House as a way to directly communicate with the American people. It is considered to be a major address and it functions as a way to move public opinion by having a direct connection with the president of the United States (compare Bully pulpit). Presidential historian Robert Dallek stated, “The Oval Office invokes the center of the presidential authority. That's the president's office, that's where he supposedly makes decisions, where he governs.” As the formal executive office of the president, the Oval Office sets the tone for any address to the American people. It is also where the president will communicate national news such as terrorist attacks, and each president usually gives their farewell speech in the Oval Office.

The first Oval Office address was delivered to the nation by President Herbert Hoover, who spoke on peace efforts and arms reduction throughout the world. President Dwight D. Eisenhower used the format in 1957 to inform the United States of his decision to send troops to Little Rock to enforce school desegregation. Being only the second ever televised address directly from the president's office, Eisenhower had to explain as much to the audience, saying, "in speaking from the house of Lincoln, of Jackson, of Wilson, my words would better convey both the sadness I feel today in the actions I feel compelled to make, and the firmness with which I intend to pursue this course."

Some previous addresses include John F. Kennedy's 1962 news of the Cuban Missile Crisis, Jimmy Carter's 1979 "Malaise" speech, Ronald Reagan's speech following the Space Shuttle Challenger disaster in 1986, George W. Bush's Address to the Nation on the evening of the 2001 September 11 terrorist attacks and Barack Obama's June 2010 speech addressing the issue of the Deepwater Horizon oil spill.

Traditionally, the addresses are delivered with the president sitting at the Resolute desk speaking into the camera. Occasionally, however, the president will stand at a lectern on the opposite side of the Oval Office and give the address. Previously, it was also common for an artificial background to be placed behind the president, ordinarily consisting of plain blue fabric. Since the administration of Gerald Ford, the preference has instead been for the natural backdrop of the Office's windows.

=== Modern format ===
There have been suggestions that the traditional Oval Office address is falling out of favor in the Information Age, with White House aide Daniel Pfeiffer describing it as "an argument from the '80s", when President Ronald Reagan would draw tens of millions of viewers per address (42 in all, the second-most of any president; Nixon ranks first, having given 43). Television networks are increasingly reluctant to sacrifice airtime for a political purpose.

In recent years, presidents have addressed the country in other White House settings. Barack Obama made several major speeches from the East Room, including an address on the Syrian civil war in 2010 an announcement of the death of Osama bin Laden, and an announcement of the withdrawal of 10,000 troops from Afghanistan.

Donald Trump used the Diplomatic Reception Room for several major announcements, including recognizing Jerusalem as the capital of Israel, the withdrawal of the United States from the Iran nuclear deal, and addressing the government shutdown in 2019.

During his presidency, Joe Biden used the White House Cross Hall or Roosevelt Room for major addresses. He delivered an announcement of a ceasefire and hostage deal in the Gaza war from the Cross Hall. From the Roosevelt Room, he addressed pro-Palestinian protests on college campuses, the fall of the Assad regime in Syria, and raising the debt ceiling during budget negotiations in 2023.

However, the tradition of the prime-time Oval Office address has continued into the Trump and Biden presidencies. The address of January 8, 2019, during the government shutdown was the first time that Trump requested airtime. The address of June 2, 2023, during the debt-ceiling crisis was the first time that Biden requested airtime.

== List of Oval Office addresses ==
President	Date	Subject	Speech
Donald Trump (2nd presidency) (2025–present)	July 17, 2026	On alleged foreign interference in the 2020 presidential election	
Donald Trump (2nd presidency) (2025–present)	April 1, 2026	On the 2026 Iran war and 2026 Strait of Hormuz crisis	
Joe Biden (2021–2025)	January 15, 2025	Farewell address	
Joe Biden (2021–2025)	July 24, 2024	On his withdrawal from the presidential race	
Joe Biden (2021–2025)	July 14, 2024	On the attempted assassination of Donald Trump	
Joe Biden (2021–2025)	October 19, 2023	On the Gaza war and Russian invasion of Ukraine	
Joe Biden (2021–2025)	June 2, 2023	On congressional approval of the Fiscal Responsibility Act of 2023	
Donald Trump (1st presidency) (2017–2021)	January 13, 2021	On the January 6th Capitol attack	
Donald Trump (1st presidency) (2017–2021)	March 11, 2020	On the coronavirus pandemic	
Donald Trump (1st presidency) (2017–2021)	January 8, 2019	On the government shutdown and the proposed United States-Mexico border wall	
Barack Obama (2009–2017)	December 6, 2015	On the United States counterterrorism strategy	
Barack Obama (2009–2017)	August 31, 2010	On United States policy towards Iraq	
Barack Obama (2009–2017)	June 15, 2010	On the Deepwater Horizon oil spill	
George W. Bush (2001–2009)	September 13, 2007	On the War in Iraq	
George W. Bush (2001–2009)	September 11, 2006	On the five year anniversary of the September 11th attacks	
George W. Bush (2001–2009)	May 15, 2006	On immigration, border security, drug policy, and the drug war in Mexico	
George W. Bush (2001–2009)	December 18, 2005	On the elections in Iraq	
George W. Bush (2001–2009)	March 19, 2003	Start of war against Iraq	
George W. Bush (2001–2009)	September 11, 2001	On the terrorist attacks in New York, Pennsylvania, and Washington D.C.	
George W. Bush (2001–2009)	August 9, 2001 (Note: Not from the Oval Office, but following the same format and treated at the same level. Aired from Bush Ranch in Crawford, Texas.)	On stem cell research	
Bill Clinton (1993–2001)	January 18, 2001	Farewell address	
Bill Clinton (1993–2001)	July 8, 2000	The President's Internet Address	
Bill Clinton (1993–2001)	June 10, 1999	On the peace agreement in Kosovo	
Bill Clinton (1993–2001)	March 24, 1999	On the NATO bombing of Yugoslavia	
Bill Clinton (1993–2001)	December 16, 1998	Start of a U.S. and British bombing campaign against Iraq	
Bill Clinton (1993–2001)	August 20, 1998	U.S. cruise missile strikes on Afghanistan and Sudan	
Bill Clinton (1993–2001)	November 27, 1995	On the Dayton Agreement	
Bill Clinton (1993–2001)	June 13, 1995	On the federal budget	
Bill Clinton (1993–2001)	December 15, 1994	Announcing a middle class bill of rights initiative	
Bill Clinton (1993–2001)	October 10, 1994	On Iraq	
Bill Clinton (1993–2001)	September 18, 1994	On the peaceful capitulation of the Haitian government	
Bill Clinton (1993–2001)	September 15, 1994	Ultimatum to the government of Haiti	
Bill Clinton (1993–2001)	October 7, 1993	On the battle of Mogadishu	
Bill Clinton (1993–2001)	August 3, 1993	On the balanced budget plan	
Bill Clinton (1993–2001)	June 26, 1993	U.S. strike on Iraq	
Bill Clinton (1993–2001)	February 15, 1993	On the national economic program	
George H. W. Bush (1989–1993)	December 4, 1992	On the crisis in Somalia	
George H. W. Bush (1989–1993)	September 1, 1992	On Hurricane Andrew disaster relief	
George H. W. Bush (1989–1993)	May 1, 1992	On the riots in Los Angeles	
George H. W. Bush (1989–1993)	December 25, 1991	On the collapse of the Soviet Union	
George H. W. Bush (1989–1993)	September 27, 1991	On reducing U.S. and Soviet nuclear weapons	
George H. W. Bush (1989–1993)	September 13, 1991	Nomination of Robert Gates as CIA Director	
George H. W. Bush (1989–1993)	February 27, 1991	End of war in the Persian Gulf	
George H. W. Bush (1989–1993)	January 16, 1991	Start of war in the Persian Gulf	
George H. W. Bush (1989–1993)	October 2, 1990	On the federal budget agreement	
George H. W. Bush (1989–1993)	September 12, 1990	Message to the people of Iraq	
George H. W. Bush (1989–1993)	August 8, 1990	On the crisis in the Persian Gulf	
George H. W. Bush (1989–1993)	December 20, 1989	On the United States invasion of Panama	
George H. W. Bush (1989–1993)	September 5, 1989	On drugs	
Ronald Reagan (1981–1989)	January 11, 1989	Farewell address	
Ronald Reagan (1981–1989)	February 2, 1988	On aid to the Nicaraguan democratic resistance	
Ronald Reagan (1981–1989)	December 10, 1987	On the Soviet-United States summit meeting	
Ronald Reagan (1981–1989)	October 14, 1987	Nomination of Robert Bork to the United States Supreme Court	
Ronald Reagan (1981–1989)	August 12, 1987	On the Iran-Contra affair and administration goals	
Ronald Reagan (1981–1989)	June 15, 1987	On the Venice economic summit, arms control, and the deficit	
Ronald Reagan (1981–1989)	March 4, 1987	On the Iran-Contra affair	
Ronald Reagan (1981–1989)	December 2, 1986	On the investigation into the Iran-Contra affair	
Ronald Reagan (1981–1989)	November 13, 1986	On the Iran-Contra affair	
Ronald Reagan (1981–1989)	November 2, 1986	On the congressional and gubernatorial midterm elections	
Ronald Reagan (1981–1989)	October 13, 1986	On meetings with Gorbachev in Iceland	
Ronald Reagan (1981–1989)	June 24, 1986	Aid to the Contras	
Ronald Reagan (1981–1989)	April 14, 1986	United States airstrike against Libya	
Ronald Reagan (1981–1989)	March 16, 1986	On the situation in Nicaragua	
Ronald Reagan (1981–1989)	February 26, 1986	On national security	
Ronald Reagan (1981–1989)	January 28, 1986	On the Space Shuttle Challenger disaster	
Ronald Reagan (1981–1989)	November 14, 1985	On the upcoming Soviet-United States meeting in Geneva	
Ronald Reagan (1981–1989)	June 30, 1985	On the hijacking of Trans World Airlines Flight 847	
Ronald Reagan (1981–1989)	May 28, 1985	On tax reform	
Ronald Reagan (1981–1989)	April 24, 1985	On federal budget and deficit reduction	
Ronald Reagan (1981–1989)	November 5, 1984	On the eve of the presidential election	
Ronald Reagan (1981–1989)	May 9, 1984	On United States policy in Central America	
Ronald Reagan (1981–1989)	January 29, 1984	Decision to seek re-election	
Ronald Reagan (1981–1989)	October 27, 1983	On recent events in Lebanon and Grenada	
Ronald Reagan (1981–1989)	September 5, 1983	On the Soviet attack on a Korean civilian airliner	
Ronald Reagan (1981–1989)	March 23, 1983	On defense and national security	
Ronald Reagan (1981–1989)	November 22, 1982	On strategic arms reduction and nuclear deterrence	
Ronald Reagan (1981–1989)	October 13, 1982	On the economy	
Ronald Reagan (1981–1989)	September 20, 1982	Announcing the formation of a Multinational Force in Lebanon	
Ronald Reagan (1981–1989)	August 16, 1982	On federal tax and budget reconciliation legislation	
Ronald Reagan (1981–1989)	April 29, 1982	On the 1983 fiscal budget	
Ronald Reagan (1981–1989)	December 23, 1981	Observance of Christmas and the situation in Poland	
Ronald Reagan (1981–1989)	September 24, 1981	On the program for economic recovery	
Ronald Reagan (1981–1989)	July 27, 1981	On federal tax reduction legislation	
Ronald Reagan (1981–1989)	February 5, 1981	On the economy	
Jimmy Carter (1977–1981)	January 14, 1981	Farewell address	
Jimmy Carter (1977–1981)	April 25, 1980	On the failed rescue attempt of American hostages in Iran	
Jimmy Carter (1977–1981)	January 4, 1980	On the Soviet invasion of Afghanistan	
Jimmy Carter (1977–1981)	October 1, 1979	On the Strategic Arms Limitation Agreement	
Jimmy Carter (1977–1981)	July 15, 1979	On consumerism and the crisis of confidence	
Jimmy Carter (1977–1981)	April 5, 1979	On energy	
Jimmy Carter (1977–1981)	November 8, 1977	Announcing a national energy policy	
Jimmy Carter (1977–1981)	April 18, 1977	On energy	
Gerald Ford (1974–1977)	October 6, 1975	On federal tax and spending regulations	
Gerald Ford (1974–1977)	May 27, 1975	On energy	
Gerald Ford (1974–1977)	May 15, 1975	On the recovery of the SS Mayaguez	
Gerald Ford (1974–1977)	March 29, 1975	On signing the Tax Reduction Act of 1975	
Gerald Ford (1974–1977)	January 13, 1975	On energy, inflation, and the economy	
Gerald Ford (1974–1977)	September 16, 1974	Pardoning of Vietnam War draft evaders	
Gerald Ford (1974–1977)	September 8, 1974	Pardoning of Richard Nixon	
Richard Nixon (1969–1974)	August 8, 1974	Announcing the resignation of the presidency	
Richard Nixon (1969–1974)	July 25, 1974	On inflation and the economy.	
Richard Nixon (1969–1974)	July 3, 1974	On returning from the Soviet Union	
Richard Nixon (1969–1974)	July 2, 1974	Message to the people of the Soviet Union	
Richard Nixon (1969–1974)	April 29, 1974	Announcing answer to the House Judiciary Committee subpoena (Watergate)	
Richard Nixon (1969–1974)	November 25, 1973	Announcing a national energy policy	
Richard Nixon (1969–1974)	November 7, 1973	Announcing policies to deal with the energy shortages	
Richard Nixon (1969–1974)	October 12, 1973	Nomination of Gerald Ford as Vice President of the United States	
Richard Nixon (1969–1974)	August 15, 1973	On the Watergate investigations	
Richard Nixon (1969–1974)	June 13, 1973	Announcing price control measures	
Richard Nixon (1969–1974)	April 30, 1973	On the Watergate investigations	
Richard Nixon (1969–1974)	April 19, 1973	Announcing an end to the energy quota system	
Richard Nixon (1969–1974)	March 29, 1973	On Vietnam and domestic problems	
Richard Nixon (1969–1974)	January 23, 1973	Announcing the conclusion of a peace agreement in Vietnam	
Richard Nixon (1969–1974)	November 7, 1972	Victory speech	
Richard Nixon (1969–1974)	November 6, 1972	On the eve of the presidential election	
Richard Nixon (1969–1974)	November 2, 1972	"Look to the Future"	
Richard Nixon (1969–1974)	July 4, 1972	Announcing plans for America's bicentennial celebration	
Richard Nixon (1969–1974)	May 28, 1972	Message to the people of the Soviet Union	
Richard Nixon (1969–1974)	May 8, 1972	On the situation in Southeast Asia	
Richard Nixon (1969–1974)	April 26, 1972	On Vietnam	
Richard Nixon (1969–1974)	March 16, 1972	On equal educational opportunities and school busing	
Richard Nixon (1969–1974)	February 8, 1972	On the environment	
Richard Nixon (1969–1974)	January 25, 1972	Announcing a plan for peace in Vietnam	
Richard Nixon (1969–1974)	October 21, 1971	Nomination of Powell and Rehnquist to the United States Supreme Court	
Richard Nixon (1969–1974)	October 7, 1971	On the post-freeze economic stabilization program	
Richard Nixon (1969–1974)	September 6, 1971	Observance of Labor Day	
Richard Nixon (1969–1974)	August 15, 1971	Announcing a new economic policy: "The Challenge of Peace"	
Richard Nixon (1969–1974)	July 15, 1971	Announcing acceptance of an invitation to visit China	
Richard Nixon (1969–1974)	May 20, 1971	Announcing a Strategic Arms Limitation Agreement with the Soviet Union	
Richard Nixon (1969–1974)	April 7, 1971	On the situation in Southeast Asia (Vietnam)	
Richard Nixon (1969–1974)	February 25, 1971	On the second annual foreign policy report to Congress	
Richard Nixon (1969–1974)	February 18, 1971	On healthcare	
Richard Nixon (1969–1974)	October 7, 1970	Announcing a new initiative for peace in Southeast Asia (Vietnam)	
Richard Nixon (1969–1974)	June 17. 1970	On economic policy and productivity	
Richard Nixon (1969–1974)	June 3, 1970	On the Cambodian sanctuary operation	
Richard Nixon (1969–1974)	April 30, 1970	On the situation in Southeast Asia (Cambodian Incursion)	
Richard Nixon (1969–1974)	April 20, 1970	On progress toward peace in Vietnam	
Richard Nixon (1969–1974)	March 23, 1970	On the postal strike	
Richard Nixon (1969–1974)	December 15, 1969	On progress toward peace in Vietnam	
Richard Nixon (1969–1974)	November 3, 1969	On the War in Vietnam	
Richard Nixon (1969–1974)	October 17, 1969	On the rising cost of living	
Richard Nixon (1969–1974)	August 8. 1969	On domestic programs	
Richard Nixon (1969–1974)	May 14, 1969	On Vietnam	
Lyndon B. Johnson (1963–1969)	October 31, 1968	Announcing his decision to halt the bombing of North Vietnam	
Lyndon B. Johnson (1963–1969)	June 6, 1968	On the death of Robert Francis Kennedy	
Lyndon B. Johnson (1963–1969)	June 5, 1968	On the assassination attempt on Robert Francis Kennedy	
Lyndon B. Johnson (1963–1969)	April 5, 1968	On the assassination of Martin Luther King Jr.	
Lyndon B. Johnson (1963–1969)	March 31, 1968	On the war in Vietnam and his withdrawal from the presidential race	
Lyndon B. Johnson (1963–1969)	January 26, 1968	On the capture of the USS Pueblo by North Korean forces	
Lyndon B. Johnson (1963–1969)	July 27, 1967	On civil disorder in the United States	
Lyndon B. Johnson (1963–1969)	July 24, 1967	On the riots in Detroit	
Lyndon B. Johnson (1963–1969)	July 12, 1966	On United States foreign policy in Asia	
Lyndon B. Johnson (1963–1969)	January 31, 1966	On the resumption of bombing of North Vietnam	
Lyndon B. Johnson (1963–1969)	August 6, 1965	On the signing of the Voting Rights Act	
Lyndon B. Johnson (1963–1969)	July 28, 1965	On Vietnam and the United States Supreme Court	
Lyndon B. Johnson (1963–1969)	May 2, 1965	On the situation in the Dominican Republic	
Lyndon B. Johnson (1963–1969)	April 28, 1965	On the decision to send troops to the Dominican Republic	
Lyndon B. Johnson (1963–1969)	March 26, 1965	On the arrests of those involved in the murder of Viola Liuzzo	
Lyndon B. Johnson (1963–1969)	November 2, 1964	On the eve of the presidential election	
Lyndon B. Johnson (1963–1969)	October 18, 1964	On recent events in China, the USSR, and Great Britain	
Lyndon B. Johnson (1963–1969)	October 7, 1964	On the upcoming presidential election	
Lyndon B. Johnson (1963–1969)	August 4, 1964	On the Gulf of Tonkin incident	
Lyndon B. Johnson (1963–1969)	July 2, 1964	On the signing of the Civil Rights Bill	
Lyndon B. Johnson (1963–1969)	April 22, 1964	On the railroad strike	
Lyndon B. Johnson (1963–1969)	November 28, 1963	Observance of Thanksgiving	
Lyndon B. Johnson (1963–1969)	November 23, 1963	On the assassination of John Fitzgerald Kennedy	
John F. Kennedy (1961–1963)	September 18, 1963	On the Test Ban Treaty and the tax reduction bill	
John F. Kennedy (1961–1963)	July 26, 1963	On the Nuclear Test Ban Treaty	
John F. Kennedy (1961–1963)	July 10, 1963	Announcing postponing of the railroad strike	
John F. Kennedy (1961–1963)	July 5, 1963	On returning from a trip to Europe	
John F. Kennedy (1961–1963)	June 11, 1963	On civil rights	
John F. Kennedy (1961–1963)	May 16, 1963	On the flight of astronaut L. Gordon Cooper	
John F. Kennedy (1961–1963)	May 12, 1963	On the race riots in Birmingham, Alabama	
John F. Kennedy (1961–1963)	November 3, 1962	Encouraging the American people to vote in the midterm elections	
John F. Kennedy (1961–1963)	November 2, 1962	Announcing an end to the Cuban Missile Crisis	
John F. Kennedy (1961–1963)	October 22, 1962	On the Cuban Missile Crisis	
John F. Kennedy (1961–1963)	September 30, 1962	On the situation at the University of Mississippi	
John F. Kennedy (1961–1963)	August 13, 1962	On the economy	
John F. Kennedy (1961–1963)	July 2, 1962	Announcing recognition of Algerian independence	
John F. Kennedy (1961–1963)	March 3, 1962	On nuclear testing and deterrent	
John F. Kennedy (1961–1963)	July 25, 1961	On the Berlin Crisis	
John F. Kennedy (1961–1963)	June 6, 1961	On returning from Europe	
Dwight Eisenhower (1953–1961)	January 17, 1961	Farewell address	
Dwight Eisenhower (1953–1961)	June 27, 1960	On the trip to the Far East	
Dwight Eisenhower (1953–1961)	May 25, 1960	On recent events in Paris	
Dwight Eisenhower (1953–1961)	March 8, 1960	On the trip to South America	
Dwight Eisenhower (1953–1961)	February 21, 1960	On leaving for a trip to South America	
Dwight Eisenhower (1953–1961)	December 3, 1959	On leaving for a trip to Europe, Asia, and South America	
Dwight Eisenhower (1953–1961)	September 10, 1959	On the trip to Europe	
Dwight Eisenhower (1953–1961)	August 6, 1959	On the need for an effective labor bill	
Dwight Eisenhower (1953–1961)	March 16, 1959	On security in the free world	
Dwight Eisenhower (1953–1961)	September 11, 1958	On the Formosan Straits crisis	
Dwight Eisenhower (1953–1961)	July 15, 1958	On the United States mission in Beirut	
Dwight Eisenhower (1953–1961)	December 23, 1957	On the NATO conference in Paris	
Dwight Eisenhower (1953–1961)	November 13, 1957	On future security	
Dwight Eisenhower (1953–1961)	November 7, 1957	On science and national security	
Dwight Eisenhower (1953–1961)	September 24, 1957	On the Little Rock school integration crisis	
Dwight Eisenhower (1953–1961)	May 21, 1957	On mutual security	
Dwight Eisenhower (1953–1961)	May 14, 1957	On the federal budget	
Dwight Eisenhower (1953–1961)	February 20, 1957	On the situation in the Middle East and the Eisenhower Doctrine	
Dwight Eisenhower (1953–1961)	October 31, 1956	On the uprising in Hungary and the Suez Crisis	
Dwight Eisenhower (1953–1961)	September 19, 1956	Start of the president's re-election campaign	
Dwight Eisenhower (1953–1961)	April 16, 1956	On the farm bill veto	
Dwight Eisenhower (1953–1961)	February 29, 1956	Decision to seek re-election	
Dwight Eisenhower (1953–1961)	January 5, 1956	On the State of the Union	
Dwight Eisenhower (1953–1961)	July 25, 1955	On the Geneva Convention	
Dwight Eisenhower (1953–1961)	July 15, 1955	On the upcoming convention in Geneva	
Dwight Eisenhower (1953–1961)	August 23, 1954	On the achievements of the 83rd Congress	
Dwight Eisenhower (1953–1961)	April 5, 1954	On the State of the Union	
Dwight Eisenhower (1953–1961)	March 15, 1954	On the tax program	
Dwight Eisenhower (1953–1961)	January 4, 1954	On the administration's purposes and accomplishments	
Dwight Eisenhower (1953–1961)	August 6, 1953	On the achievements of the 83rd Congress	
Dwight Eisenhower (1953–1961)	July 26, 1953	On the armistice on the Korean peninsula	
Dwight Eisenhower (1953–1961)	May 19, 1953	On national security	
Harry S. Truman (1945–1953)	January 15, 1953	Farewell address	
Harry S. Truman (1945–1953)	November 3, 1952	On the eve of the presidential election	
Harry S. Truman (1945–1953)	April 8, 1952	On the steel mills crisis	
Harry S. Truman (1945–1953)	March 6, 1952	On mutual security	
Harry S. Truman (1945–1953)	November 7, 1951	On international arms reduction	
Harry S. Truman (1945–1953)	June 14, 1951	On inflation	
Harry S. Truman (1945–1953)	April 11, 1951	On the war in Korea and the removal of General Douglas MacArthur	
Harry S. Truman (1945–1953)	December 24, 1950	Observance of Christmas	
Harry S. Truman (1945–1953)	December 19, 1950	On the War in Korea and national emergency	
Harry S. Truman (1945–1953)	September 9, 1950	On the signing of the Defense Production Act	
Harry S. Truman (1945–1953)	September 1, 1950	On the progress of the war	
Harry S. Truman (1945–1953)	July 19, 1950	On the war in Korea	
Harry S. Truman (1945–1953)	September 27, 1949	Observance of Democratic Women's Day	
Harry S. Truman (1945–1953)	July 13, 1949	On the economy	
Harry S. Truman (1945–1953)	April 4, 1949	On the signing of the North Atlantic Treaty	
Harry S. Truman (1945–1953)	October 24, 1947	On the special session of Congress	
Harry S. Truman (1945–1953)	October 5, 1947	Food conservation to aid post-war Europe	
Harry S. Truman (1945–1953)	June 20, 1947	On the veto of the Taft-Harley bill	
Harry S. Truman (1945–1953)	October 14, 1946	Ending of price controls	
Harry S. Truman (1945–1953)	June 29, 1946	On price controls	
Harry S. Truman (1945–1953)	May 24, 1946	On the railroad strike	
Harry S. Truman (1945–1953)	January 3, 1946	Status of reconversion program	
Harry S. Truman (1945–1953)	October 30, 1945	Reconversion of wartime economy to peacetime economy	
Harry S. Truman (1945–1953)	October 2, 1945	Announcing the start of the 1945 National War Fund campaign	
Harry S. Truman (1945–1953)	September 1, 1945	Cessation of hostilities with Japan	
Harry S. Truman (1945–1953)	August 10, 1945	On the Potsdam Conference	
Harry S. Truman (1945–1953)	August 6, 1945	On the dropping of an atomic bomb on Hiroshima	
Harry S. Truman (1945–1953)	June 7, 1945	Ultimatum to Japan	
Harry S. Truman (1945–1953)	May 8, 1945	End of the War in Europe	
Harry S. Truman (1945–1953)	April 17, 1945	On the death of Franklin Delano Roosevelt	
Franklin D. Roosevelt (1933–1945)	January 6, 1945	On the State of the Union	
Franklin D. Roosevelt (1933–1945)	December 24, 1944	Observance of Christmas	
Franklin D. Roosevelt (1933–1945)	November 2, 1944	Report on the war	
Franklin D. Roosevelt (1933–1945)	October 5, 1944	On the upcoming presidential elections	
Franklin D. Roosevelt (1933–1945)	June 12, 1944	Opening of the fifth war loan drive	
Franklin D. Roosevelt (1933–1945)	June 6, 1944	On the D-Day landings	
Franklin D. Roosevelt (1933–1945)	June 5, 1944	On the fall of Rome	
Franklin D. Roosevelt (1933–1945)	January 11, 1944	On the State of the Union	
Franklin D. Roosevelt (1933–1945)	December 24, 1943	On the Tehran and Cairo conferences	
Franklin D. Roosevelt (1933–1945)	September 8, 1943	On the armistice with Italy and the third war loan drive	
Franklin D. Roosevelt (1933–1945)	July 28, 1943	On the fall of Mussolini	
Franklin D. Roosevelt (1933–1945)	May 2, 1943	On the coal crisis	
Franklin D. Roosevelt (1933–1945)	October 12, 1942	Report on the war	
Franklin D. Roosevelt (1933–1945)	September 7, 1942	On inflation and progress of the war	
Franklin D. Roosevelt (1933–1945)	June 12, 1942	On rubber	
Franklin D. Roosevelt (1933–1945)	April 28, 1942	On national economic policy and sacrifice	
Franklin D. Roosevelt (1933–1945)	February 23, 1942	On the progress of the war	
Franklin D. Roosevelt (1933–1945)	December 9, 1941	On the declaration of war with Japan	
Franklin D. Roosevelt (1933–1945)	September 11, 1941	On maintaining freedom of the seas and the Greer incident	
Franklin D. Roosevelt (1933–1945)	September 1, 1941	Observance of Labor Day	
Franklin D. Roosevelt (1933–1945)	May 27, 1941	Announcing unlimited national emergency	
Franklin D. Roosevelt (1933–1945)	December 29, 1940	On the "Arsenal of Democracy"	
Franklin D. Roosevelt (1933–1945)	May 26, 1940	On national defense	
Franklin D. Roosevelt (1933–1945)	September 3, 1939	On the European War	
Franklin D. Roosevelt (1933–1945)	November 4, 1938	On the eve of the midterm elections	
Franklin D. Roosevelt (1933–1945)	June 24, 1938	On the party primaries	
Franklin D. Roosevelt (1933–1945)	April 14, 1938	On the recession	
Franklin D. Roosevelt (1933–1945)	November 14, 1937	On the unemployment census	
Franklin D. Roosevelt (1933–1945)	October 12, 1937	On new legislation to be recommended to Congress	
Franklin D. Roosevelt (1933–1945)	March 9, 1937	On the reorganization of the judiciary	
Franklin D. Roosevelt (1933–1945)	September 6, 1936	On drought conditions, farmers, and laborers	
Franklin D. Roosevelt (1933–1945)	April 28, 1935	On the works relief program and the Social Security Act	
Franklin D. Roosevelt (1933–1945)	September 30, 1934	On government and capitalism	
Franklin D. Roosevelt (1933–1945)	June 28, 1934	On the achievements of the 73rd United States Congress and critics of the New Deal	
Franklin D. Roosevelt (1933–1945)	October 22, 1933	On economic progress	
Franklin D. Roosevelt (1933–1945)	July 24, 1933	On the National Recovery Administration	
Franklin D. Roosevelt (1933–1945)	May 7, 1933	On the New Deal program	
Franklin D. Roosevelt (1933–1945)	March 12, 1933	On the banking crisis	
Herbert Hoover (1929–1933)	November 7, 1932	Concession to Franklin Delano Roosevelt in the 1932 election	
Herbert Hoover (1929–1933)	October 16, 1932	On the campaign for community funds relief	
Herbert Hoover (1929–1933)	March 6, 1932	On the hoarding of currency	
Herbert Hoover (1929–1933)	October 18, 1931	On unemployment relief	
Herbert Hoover (1929–1933)	September 18, 1929	On peace efforts and arms reduction	

== See also ==
- List of national addresses
- State of the Union address
- Weekly address of the president of the United States
- Fireside chats
- Cadena nacional
- Special address by the British monarch
- United States presidential address to the United Nations General Assembly

== Bibliography ==
- Lu, Xin-An; Sullivan, Rita (2004). Gems from the top 100 speeches. IUniverse. ISBN 978-0-595-30856-9.
