= 1968 State of the Union Address =

Speech by US President Lyndon B. Johnson

- Date: January 17, 1968
- Time: 9:00 p.m. EST
- Duration: 50 minutes
- Venue: House Chamber, United States Capitol
- Location: Washington, D.C.; 38°53′23″N 77°00′32″W
- Type: State of the Union Address
- Participants: Lyndon B. Johnson; Hubert Humphrey; John W. McCormack
- Previous: 1967 State of the Union Address
- Next: 1969 State of the Union Address

The 1968 State of the Union Address was given by the 36th president of the United States, Lyndon B. Johnson, on Wednesday, January 17, 1968, to the 90th United States Congress. He reported this, "And I report to you that I believe, with abiding conviction, that this people—nurtured by their deep faith, tutored by their hard lessons, moved by their high aspirations—have the will to meet the trials that these times impose."

In domestic matters, the President noted the success of the Medicare and Medicaid programs which were used by 25 million Americans. He advocated for rebuilding cities by encouraging more building of homes and apartments with a goal of 6 million housing units in 10 years.

== See also ==
- 1968 United States presidential election

Preceded by 1967 State of the Union Address	State of the Union addresses 1968	Succeeded by 1969 State of the Union Address
