= 1967 State of the Union Address =

Speech by US President Lyndon B. Johnson

- Date: January 10, 1967
- Time: 9:30 p.m. EST
- Duration: 71 minutes
- Venue: House Chamber, United States Capitol
- Location: Washington, D.C.; 38°53′23″N 77°00′32″W
- Type: State of the Union Address
- Participants: Lyndon B. Johnson; Hubert Humphrey; John W. McCormack
- Previous: 1966 State of the Union Address
- Next: 1968 State of the Union Address

The 1967 State of the Union Address was given by Lyndon B. Johnson, the 36th president of the United States, on Tuesday, January 10, 1967, to the 90th United States Congress in the chamber of the United States House of Representatives. It was Johnson's fourth State of the Union Address. Presiding over this joint session was House speaker John W. McCormack, accompanied by Vice President Hubert Humphrey, in his capacity as the president of the Senate.

Johnson opened this speech by quoting the opening line of Lincoln's House Divided Speech: "As President Abraham Lincoln said, 'We must ask where we are, and whither we are tending.'" Like Johnson's three previous State of the Union Addresses, much of this address was dominated by discussion of Johnson's Great Society initiatives and the Vietnam War. At over an hour, this speech was Johnson's longest State of the Union Address.

== See also ==
- Great Society
- War on Poverty
- Vietnam War

Preceded by 1966 State of the Union Address	State of the Union addresses 1967	Succeeded by 1968 State of the Union Address
