= 1962 State of the Union Address =

Speech by US President John F. Kennedy

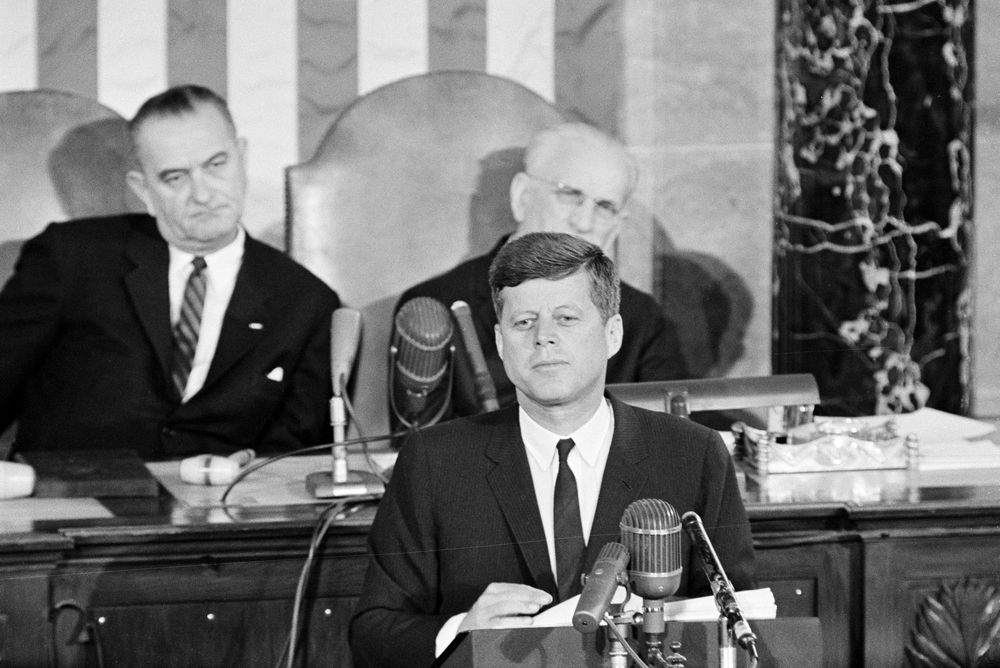
- Date: January 11, 1962
- Duration: 53 minutes
- Venue: House Chamber, United States Capitol
- Location: Washington, D.C.; 38°53′23″N 77°00′32″W
- Type: State of the Union Address
- Participants: John F. Kennedy; Lyndon B. Johnson; John W. McCormack
- Previous: January 30, 1961 State of the Union Address
- Next: 1963 State of the Union Address

The 1962 State of the Union Address was given by John F. Kennedy, the 35th president of the United States, on Thursday, January 11, 1962, to the 87th United States Congress in the chamber of the United States House of Representatives. It was Kennedy's second State of the Union Address. Presiding over this joint session was newly elected House speaker John W. McCormack, accompanied by Vice President Lyndon B. Johnson, in his capacity as the president of the Senate.

Kennedy began his speech with a tribute to former House Speaker Sam Rayburn who had recently died in office:

This week we begin anew our joint and separate efforts to build the American future. But, sadly, we build without a man who linked a long past with the present and looked strongly to the future. "Mister Sam" Rayburn is gone. Neither this House nor the Nation is the same without him.

In this speech, Kennedy discussed his plans for the economy in response to the recent recession and threat of inflation. He also addressed the need for Congress to respond to certain domestic issues including pollution, education, mass transit, urban housing, civil rights, public health, and welfare assistance programs. On the side of foreign affairs, Kennedy spoke about the spread of communism through Asia and Latin America, his plan for Cold War diplomacy, and the importance of organizations such as the United Nations and the North Atlantic Treaty Organization in managing international affairs. In closing his speech Kennedy described the United States' position as one of danger and struggle but reassured that the United States was ready to meet the challenge:

A year ago, in assuming the tasks of the Presidency, I said that few generations, in all history, had been granted the role of being the great defender of freedom in its hour of maximum danger. This is our good fortune; and I welcome it now as I did a year ago. For it is the fate of this generation—of you in the Congress and of me as President—to live with a struggle we did not start, in a world we did not make. But the pressures of life are not always distributed by choice. And while no nation has ever faced such a challenge, no nation has ever been so ready to seize the burden and the glory of freedom. And in this high endeavor, may God watch over the United States of America.

Preceded by January 30, 1961 State of the Union Address	State of the Union addresses 1962	Succeeded by 1963 State of the Union Address
