= 1969 State of the Union Address =

Speech by US President Lyndon B. Johnson

- Date: January 14, 1969
- Time: 9:00 p.m. EST
- Duration: 44 minutes
- Venue: House Chamber, United States Capitol
- Location: Washington, D.C.; 38°53′23″N 77°00′32″W
- Type: State of the Union Address
- Participants: Lyndon B. Johnson; Hubert Humphrey; John W. McCormack
- Previous: 1968 State of the Union Address
- Next: 1970 State of the Union Address

The 1969 State of the Union Address was given by Lyndon B. Johnson, the 36th president of the United States, on Tuesday, January 14, 1969, to the 91st United States Congress in the chamber of the United States House of Representatives. It was Johnson's sixth and final State of the Union Address. Presiding over this joint session was House speaker John W. McCormack, accompanied by Vice President Hubert Humphrey, in his capacity as the president of the Senate.

Johnson's speech functioned effectively as a farewell address, focusing on the major accomplishments of his administration. Like Johnson's previous State of the Union Addresses, this address included discussion of Johnson's Great Society initiatives and the Vietnam War. Johnson said that his greatest regret as president was his inability to pass a law creating a federal gun registry:

Frankly, as I leave the Office of the Presidency, one of my greatest disappointments is our failure to secure passage of a licensing and registration act for firearms. I think if we had passed that act, it would have reduced the incidence of crime. I believe that the Congress should adopt such a law, and I hope that it will at a not too distant date.

At the end of his speech, Johnson thanked many individuals for their counsel and assistance during his time in office. These included former presidents Harry S. Truman and Dwight D. Eisenhower, Vice President Hubert Humphrey, House Speaker John W. McCormack, House Majority Leader Carl Albert, Senator Mike Mansfield, President pro tempore Richard Brevard Russell, and Republican congressional leaders Senator Everett Dirksen and House Minority Leader Gerald Ford. Johnson then urged that no one should increase burdens on President-elect Richard Nixon for the sake of partisanship, and then he closed his speech with these words:

Now, it is time to leave. I hope it may be said, a hundred years from now, that by working together we helped to make our country more just, more just for all of its people, as well as to insure and guarantee the blessings of liberty for all of our posterity. That is what I hope. But I believe that at least it will be said that we tried.

== See also ==
- Great Society
- War on Poverty
- Vietnam War

Preceded by 1968 State of the Union Address	State of the Union addresses 1969	Succeeded by 1970 State of the Union Address
