= 1970 State of the Union Address =

Speech by US President Richard Nixon

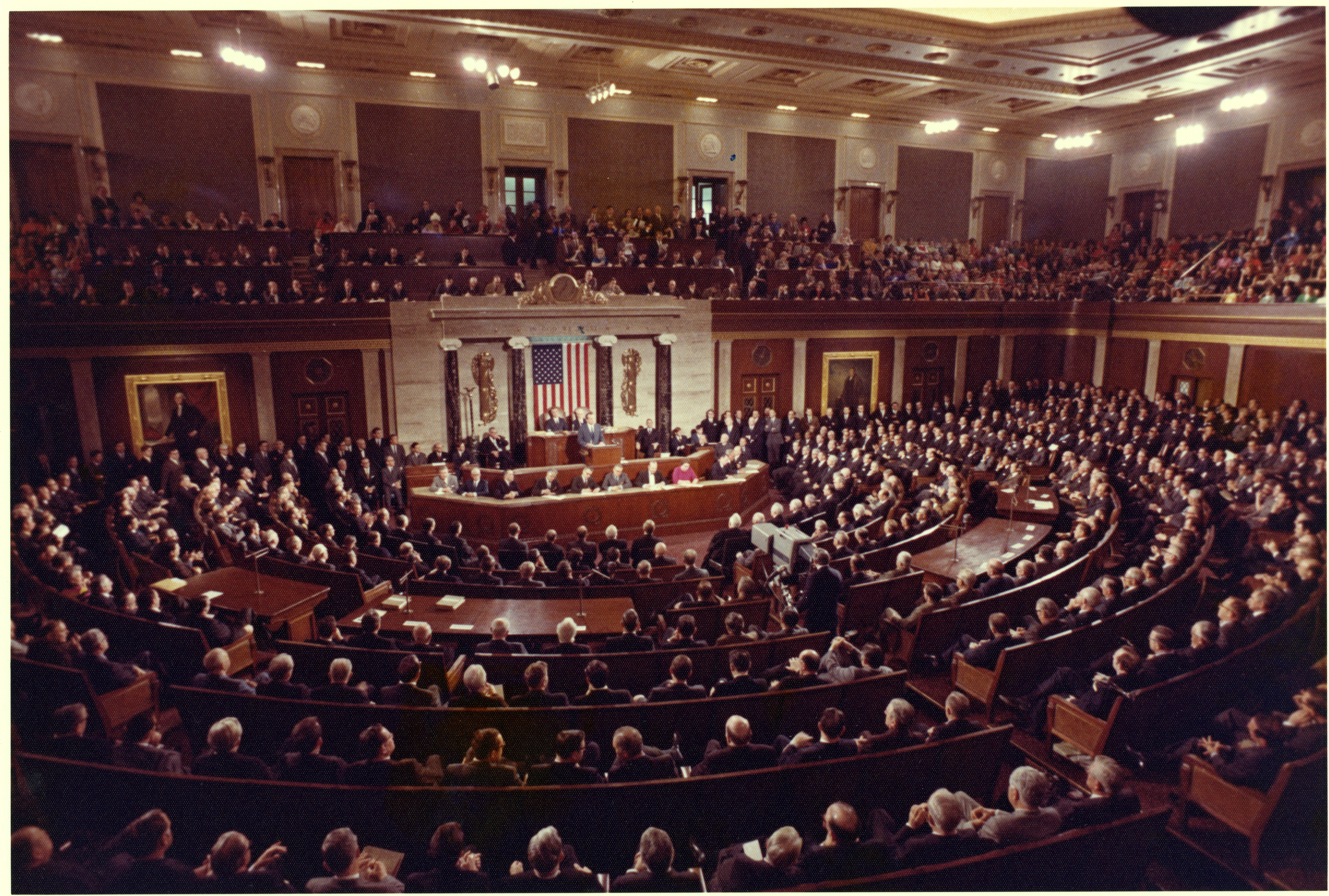
- Date: January 22, 1970
- Time: 12:30 p.m. EST
- Duration: 37 minutes
- Venue: House Chamber, United States Capitol
- Location: Washington, D.C.; 38°53′23″N 77°00′32″W
- Type: State of the Union Address
- Participants: Richard Nixon; Spiro Agnew; John W. McCormack
- Previous: 1969 State of the Union Address
- Next: 1971 State of the Union Address

The 1970 State of the Union Address was given by Richard Nixon, the 37th United States president, on January 22, 1970, to both houses of the 91st United States Congress.

An excerpt reads,

I say this not only because 1970 marks the beginning of a new decade in which America will celebrate its 200th birthday. The seventies will be a time of new beginnings, a time of exploring both on the earth and in the heavens, a time of discovery. But the time has also come for emphasis on developing better ways of managing what we have and of completing what man's genius has begun but left unfinished.

I say it because new knowledge and hard experience argue persuasively that both our programs and our institutions in America need to be reformed.

The moment has arrived to harness the vast energies and abundance of this land to the creation of a new American experience, an experience richer and deeper and more truly a reflection of the goodness and grace of the human spirit."

Nixon stressed in his speech three areas of focus that he wanted to value during his presidency, the welfare system, the government system, and American opportunity. He talks about the American dream and giving the people opportunities, "Third, we must adopt reforms which will expand the range of opportunities for all Americans. We can fulfill the American dream only when each person has a fair chance to fulfill his own dreams. This means equal voting rights, equal employment opportunity, and new opportunities for expanded ownership. Because in order to be secure in their human rights, people need access to property rights."

Nixon later goes on to talk about health care and providing each American with quality health care, "It is time to bring comprehensive, high quality health care within the reach of every American. [We should] assure comprehensive health insurance protection to millions who cannot now obtain it or afford it, with improved protection against catastrophic illnesses. This will be a plan that maintains the high standards of quality in America's health care. And it will not require additional taxes." Nixon mentions many topics that the American people stressed about the most. The security, freedom, and health of the nation was the most stagnant points in the address.

Fully one-third of Nixon's speech was dedicated to environmental issues.

Preceded by 1969 State of the Union Address	State of the Union addresses 1970	Succeeded by 1971 State of the Union Address
