= 1965 State of the Union Address =

Speech by US President Lyndon B. Johnson

- Date: January 4, 1965
- Time: 9:00 p.m. EST
- Duration: 47 minutes
- Venue: House Chamber, United States Capitol
- Location: Washington, D.C.; 38°53′23″N 77°00′32″W
- Type: State of the Union Address
- Participants: Lyndon B. Johnson; Carl Hayden; John W. McCormack
- Previous: 1964 State of the Union Address
- Next: 1966 State of the Union Address

The 1965 State of the Union Address was given by Lyndon B. Johnson, the 36th president of the United States, on Monday, January 4, 1965, to the 89th United States Congress in the chamber of the United States House of Representatives. It was Johnson's second State of the Union Address. Presiding over this joint session was House speaker John W. McCormack, accompanied by Senate president pro tempore Carl Hayden.

In this speech, Johnson stated that the state of the union was dependent on the state of the world and discussed various issues of foreign policy including the Vietnam War. Johnson further discussed the aims of his Great Society initiative and set forth several proposals to advance it, stating

We worked for two centuries to climb this peak of prosperity. But we are only at the beginning of the road to the Great Society. Ahead now is a summit where freedom from the wants of the body can help fulfill the needs of the spirit. We built this Nation to serve its people. We want to grow and build and create, but we want progress to be the servant and not the master of man. We do not intend to live in the midst of abundance, isolated from neighbors and nature, confined by blighted cities and bleak suburbs, stunted by a poverty of learning and an emptiness of leisure. The Great Society asks not how much, but how good; not only how to create wealth but how to use it; not only how fast we are going, but where we are headed.

This was the first State of the Union Address to be broadcast on television in a prime time slot in the evening. The New York Times noted that this decision likely doubled or tripled the size of the audience. It also enabled major television networks to promote the event and have commentators on hand to discuss it. The first State of the Union Address to be delivered in the evening for a radio broadcast was Franklin D. Roosevelt's 1936 State of the Union Address, and the first State of the Union Address to be broadcast on television was Harry S. Truman's 1947 State of the Union Address, but this address was the first to be broadcast both on television and in the evening.

== See also ==
- Great Society
- War on Poverty

Preceded by 1964 State of the Union Address	State of the Union addresses 1965	Succeeded by 1966 State of the Union Address
