= 1966 State of the Union Address =

Speech by US President Lyndon B. Johnson

- Date: January 12, 1966
- Time: 9:00 p.m. EST
- Duration: 51 minutes
- Venue: House Chamber, United States Capitol
- Location: Washington, D.C.; 38°53′23″N 77°00′32″W
- Type: State of the Union Address
- Participants: Lyndon B. Johnson; Hubert Humphrey; John W. McCormack
- Previous: 1965 State of the Union Address
- Next: 1967 State of the Union Address

The 1966 State of the Union Address was given by Lyndon B. Johnson, the 36th president of the United States, on Wednesday, January 12, 1966, to the 89th United States Congress. In the speech, Johnson addressed the then-ongoing war in Vietnam, his Great Society and War on Poverty domestic programs, civil rights, and other matters.

The President closed by mentioning the gravity of the current times by saying:

Yet as long as others will challenge America's security and test the clearness of our beliefs with fire and steel, then we must stand or see the promise of two centuries tremble. I believe tonight that you do not want me to try that risk. And from that belief your President summons his strength for the trials that lie ahead in the days to come.

== See also ==
- United States House of Representatives elections, 1966

Preceded by 1965 State of the Union Address	State of the Union addresses 1966	Succeeded by 1967 State of the Union Address
