= 1963 State of the Union Address =

Speech by US President John F. Kennedy

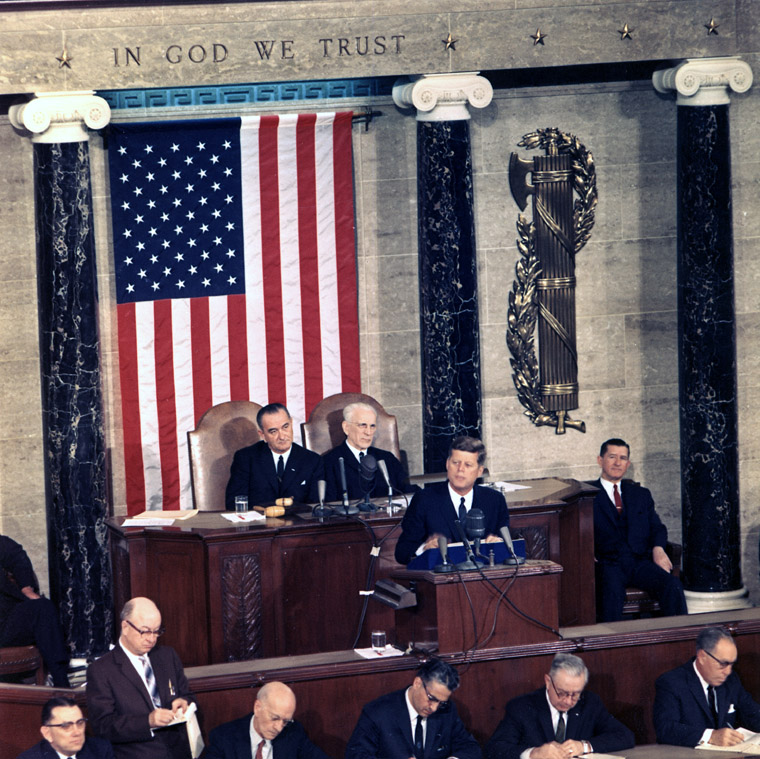
- Date: January 14, 1963
- Time: 12:30 p.m. EST
- Duration: 43 minutes
- Venue: House Chamber, United States Capitol
- Location: Washington, D.C.; 38°53′23″N 77°00′32″W
- Type: State of the Union Address
- Participants: John F. Kennedy; Lyndon B. Johnson; John W. McCormack
- Previous: 1962 State of the Union Address
- Next: 1964 State of the Union Address

The 1963 State of the Union Address was given by John F. Kennedy, the 35th president of the United States, on Monday, January 14, 1963, to the 88th United States Congress in the chamber of the United States House of Representatives. It was Kennedy's third and final State of the Union Address. Presiding over this joint session was House speaker John W. McCormack, accompanied by Vice President Lyndon B. Johnson, in his capacity as the president of the Senate.

Kennedy's speech addressed various economic concerns, such as taxation policy. Kennedy called for a major revision of the federal taxation system, saying that "To achieve these greater gains, one step, above all, is essential—the enactment this year of a substantial reduction and revision in Federal income taxes." Kennedy's speech also spent a significant time addressing foreign policy with regard to the Soviet Union and other Cold War-era concerns. He said that the United States must be prepared with a strong national defense, including nuclear weapons:

Finally, what can we do to move from the present pause toward enduring peace? Again I would counsel caution. I foresee no spectacular reversal in Communist methods or goals. But if all these trends and developments can persuade the Soviet Union to walk the path of peace, then let her know that all free nations will journey with her. But until that choice is made, and until the world can develop a reliable system of international security, the free peoples have no choice but to keep their arms nearby. This country, therefore, continues to require the best defense in the world—a defense which is suited to the sixties. This means, unfortunately, a rising defense budget—for there is no substitute for adequate defense, and no "bargain basement" way of achieving it. It means the expenditure of more than $15 billion this year on nuclear weapons systems alone, a sum which is about equal to the combined defense budgets of our European Allies.

Preceded by 1962 State of the Union Address	State of the Union addresses 1963	Succeeded by 1964 State of the Union Address
