= 1964 State of the Union Address =

Speech by US President Lyndon B. Johnson

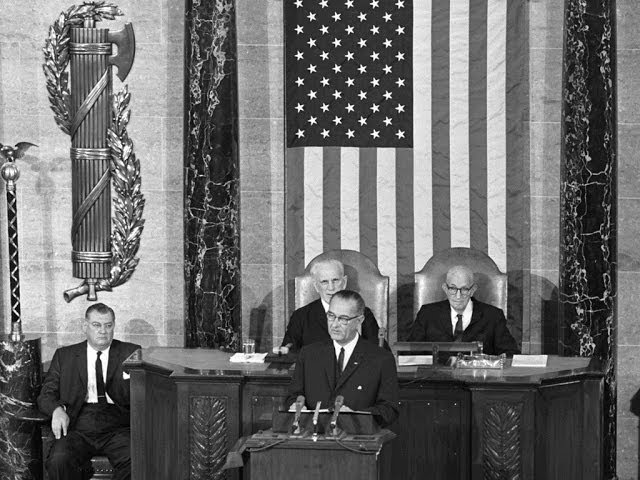
- President Johnson delivering the address
- Date: January 8, 1964
- Duration: 41 minutes
- Venue: House Chamber, United States Capitol
- Location: Washington, D.C.; 38°53′23″N 77°00′32″W
- Type: State of the Union Address
- Participants: Lyndon B. Johnson; Carl Hayden; John W. McCormack
- Previous: 1963 State of the Union Address
- Next: 1965 State of the Union Address

1964 State of the Union Address
Lyndon B. Johnson delivers his first State of the Union address on January 8, 1964.

The 1964 State of the Union Address was given by Lyndon B. Johnson, the 36th president of the United States, on Wednesday, January 8, 1964, to the 88th United States Congress in the chamber of the United States House of Representatives. It was Johnson's first State of the Union Address and his second speech to a joint session of the United States Congress after the assassination of his predecessor John F. Kennedy in November 1963. Presiding over this joint session was House speaker John W. McCormack, accompanied by Senate president pro tempore Carl Hayden.

In the speech, Johnson announced his War on Poverty initiative, declaring "This administration today, here and now, declares unconditional war on poverty in America. I urge this Congress and all Americans to join with me in that effort." Johnson thus discussed the need to improve the unemployment rate, urged equal civil rights for all Americans, and proposed a reduced budget for the next fiscal year.

Preceded by 1963 State of the Union Address	State of the Union addresses 1964	Succeeded by 1965 State of the Union Address
