= January 12, 1961 State of the Union Address =

Speech by US President Dwight D. Eisenhower

January 12, 1961, State of the Union Address
- Date: January 12, 1961
- Venue: House Chamber and Senate Chamber, United States Capitol
- Location: Washington, D.C.
- Type: State of the Union Address
- Participants: Dwight D. Eisenhower; Richard Nixon; Sam Rayburn
- Format: Written
- Previous: 1960 State of the Union Address
- Next: January 30, 1961 State of the Union Address

The first 1961 State of the Union Address was delivered in written format by Dwight D. Eisenhower, the 34th president of the United States, on Thursday, January 12, 1961, to the 87th United States Congress. It was Eisenhower's ninth and final State of the Union Address.

The message was transmitted to the House of Representatives on January 12, but since the Senate was not in session that day, it was transmitted to the Senate on January 13.

In the address, Eisenhower reflected on the accomplishments of his administration in the past eight years, stating that he wished "to review briefly the record of these past eight years in the hope that, out of the sum of these experiences, lessons will emerge that are useful to our Nation." The main sections in his address included foreign policy; national defense; the economy; government finance and administration; agriculture; natural resources; education, science, and technology; civil rights; health and welfare; housing and urban development; immigration; and veterans.

Eisenhower concluded his message by revisiting his goals from 1953 and stating his aspirations for the United States:

In concluding my final message to the Congress, it is fitting to look back to my first—to the aims and ideals I set forth on February 2, 1953: To use America's influence in world affairs to advance the cause of peace and justice, to conduct the affairs of the Executive Branch with integrity and efficiency, to encourage creative initiative in our economy, and to work toward the attainment of the well-being and equality of opportunity of all citizens.... Our goal always has been to add to the spiritual, moral, and material strength of our nation. I believe we have done this. But it is a process that must never end. Let us pray that leaders of both the near and distant future will be able to keep the nation strong and at peace, that they will advance the well-being of all our people, that they will lead us on to still higher moral standards, and that, in achieving these goals, they will maintain a reasonable balance between private and governmental responsibility.

Preceded by 1960 State of the Union Address	State of the Union addresses January 12, 1961	Succeeded by January 30, 1961 State of the Union Address
