= 1959 State of the Union Address =

Speech by US President Dwight D. Eisenhower

- Date: January 9, 1959
- Time: 12:30 p.m. EST
- Duration: 42 minutes
- Venue: House Chamber, United States Capitol
- Location: Washington, D.C.; 38°53′23″N 77°00′32″W
- Type: State of the Union Address
- Participants: Dwight D. Eisenhower; Richard Nixon; Sam Rayburn
- Previous: 1958 State of the Union Address
- Next: 1960 State of the Union Address

The 1959 State of the Union Address was given by Dwight D. Eisenhower, the 34th president of the United States, on Friday, January 9, 1959, to the 86th United States Congress in the chamber of the United States House of Representatives. It was Eisenhower's seventh State of the Union Address. Presiding over this joint session was House speaker Sam Rayburn, accompanied by Vice President Richard Nixon, in his capacity as the president of the Senate. The speech was broadcast by radio and television.

Eisenhower opened this speech with a question:

As we meet today, in the 170th year of the Republic, our Nation must continue to provide—as all other free governments have had to do throughout time—a satisfactory answer to a question as old as history. It is: Can Government based upon liberty and the God-given rights of man, permanently endure when ceaselessly challenged by a dictatorship, hostile to our mode of life, and controlling an economic and military power of great and growing strength?

Eisenhower continued on to address many subjects, such as the economy in light of the Recession of 1958, saying, "A year ago the nation was experiencing a decline in employment and output. Today that recession is fading into history, and this without gigantic, hastily-improvised public works projects or untimely tax reductions." Eisenhower also addressed the need for a balanced federal budget and future tax cuts. He called for legislation to strengthen civil rights laws and to correct abuses of labor unions. He advocated for more spending for national defense while increasing efficiency and reducing waste. He also called for increased spending with regard to health programs, science and education, water resources, highways and rebuilding cities.

Eisenhower closed his speech by opposing Marxism and calling on the United States to remember its founding ideals:

Finally—let us remind ourselves that Marxist scripture is not new; it is not the gospel of the future. Its basic objective is dictatorship, old as history. What is new is the shining prospect that man can build a world where all can live in dignity. We seek victory—not over any nation or people—but over the ancient enemies of us all; victory over ignorance, poverty, disease, and human degradation wherever they may be found. We march in the noblest of causes—human freedom. If we make ourselves worthy of America's ideals, if we do not forget that our nation was founded on the premise that all men are creatures of God's making, the world will come to know that it is free men who carry forward the true promise of human progress and dignity.

Preceded by 1958 State of the Union Address	State of the Union addresses 1958	Succeeded by 1960 State of the Union Address
