= 1960 State of the Union Address =

Speech by US President Dwight D. Eisenhower

- Date: January 7, 1960
- Duration: 45 minutes
- Venue: House Chamber, United States Capitol
- Location: Washington, D.C.; 38°53′23″N 77°00′32″W
- Type: State of the Union Address
- Participants: Dwight D. Eisenhower; Richard Nixon; Sam Rayburn
- Previous: 1959 State of the Union Address
- Next: January 12, 1961, State of the Union Address

The 1960 State of the Union Address was given on Thursday, January 7, 1960, by Dwight D. Eisenhower, the 34th president of the United States, to a joint session of the 86th United States Congress. He said, "We must strive to break the calamitous cycle of frustrations and crises which, if unchecked, could spiral into nuclear disaster; the ultimate insanity." It was the height of the Cold War, and both the Soviet Union and the United States had a responsibility to the world.

== Key statements ==
- On my recent visit to distant lands I found one statesman after another eager to tell me of the elements of their government that had been borrowed from our American Constitution, and from the indestructible ideals set forth in our Declaration of Independence.
- So dedicated, and with faith in the Almighty, humanity shall one day achieve the unity in freedom to which all men have aspired from the dawn of time.

== See also ==
- 1960 United States presidential election

Preceded by 1959 State of the Union Address	State of the Union addresses 1960	Succeeded by January 12, 1961 State of the Union Address
