= Electoral history of John W. McCormack =

List of elections featuring John W. McCormack as a candidate

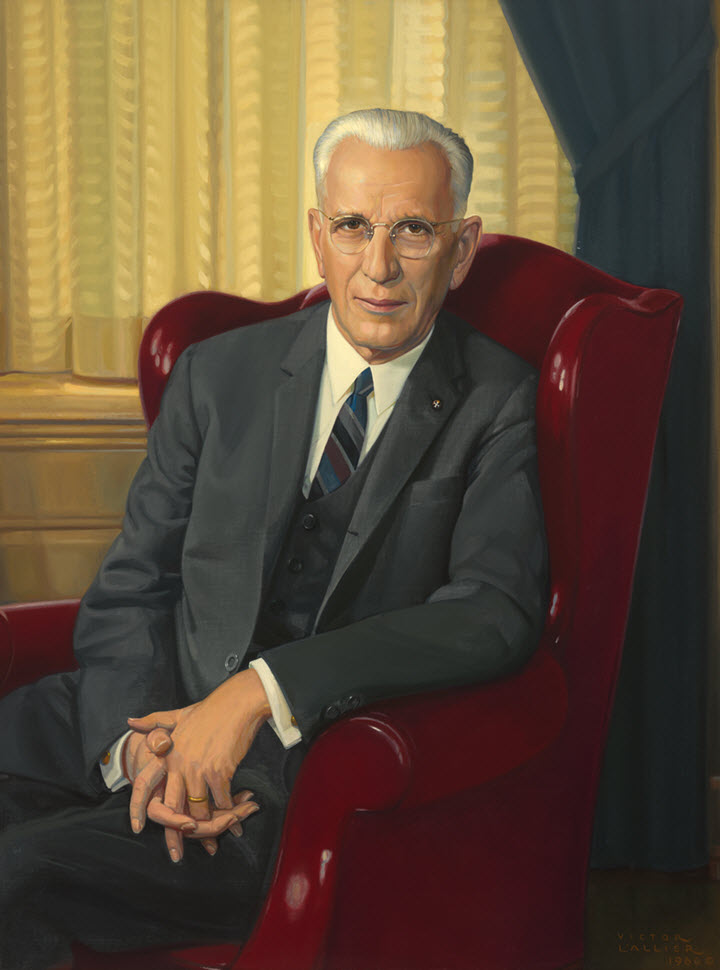
Official Speaker portrait of John McCormack, 1966

Electoral history of John W. McCormack, United States Representative for Massachusetts, from the 12th (1928–1963) and 9th districts (1963–1971), Speaker of the House (1962–1971).

McCormack's 6 decade political career begun with his election to the Massachusetts House of Representatives in 1920 and ended with his retirement in 1971.

== Massachusetts State Senate ==
Massachusetts's 3rd Suffolk district election, 1922
Party	Candidate	Votes	%
Democratic	John W. McCormack	14,900	100.00
Total votes		14,900	100.00

Massachusetts's 3rd Suffolk district election, 1924
Party	Candidate	Votes	%
Democratic	John W. McCormack (incumbent)	15,833	85.47
Republican	Henry J. Kogel	2,692	14.53
Total votes		18,525	100.00

== U.S. House of Representatives ==
=== 1926 primary ===
Massachusetts's 12th congressional district election, 1926
Primary election
Party	Candidate	Votes	%
Democratic	James A. Gallivan (incumbent)	20,443	65.34
Democratic	John W. McCormack	10,838	34.64
Write-in		5	0.02
Total votes		31,286	100.00

=== 1928 ===
Massachusetts's 12th congressional district special election, 1928
Party	Candidate	Votes	%
Democratic	John W. McCormack	62,435	76.51
Republican	Herbert W. Burr	19,164	23.49
Total votes		81,499	100.00

Massachusetts's 12th congressional district election, 1928
Party	Candidate	Votes	%
Democratic	John W. McCormack	64,531	76.35
Republican	Herbert W. Burr	19,937	23.65
Total votes		84,288	100.00

=== 1930 ===
Massachusetts's 12th congressional district election, 1930
Party	Candidate	Votes	%
Democratic	John W. McCormack (incumbent)	50,894	76.75
Republican	Samuel Abrams	15,422	23.25
Total votes		66,316	100.00

=== 1932 ===
Massachusetts's 12th congressional district election, 1932
Party	Candidate	Votes	%
Democratic	John W. McCormack (incumbent)	69,994	72.92
Republican	Bernard Ginsburg	25,995	27.08
Total votes		95,989	100.00

=== 1934 ===
Massachusetts's 12th congressional district election, 1934
Party	Candidate	Votes	%
Democratic	John W. McCormack (incumbent)	78,783	82.8
Republican	Francis A. Pentoney	16,370	17.2
Total votes		95,153	100.00

=== 1936 ===
Massachusetts's 12th congressional district election, 1936
Party	Candidate	Votes	%
Democratic	John W. McCormack (incumbent)	78,711	68.72
Republican	Albert P. McCulloch	35,827	31.28
Total votes		114,538	100.00

=== 1938 ===
Massachusetts's 12th congressional district election, 1938
Party	Candidate	Votes	%
Democratic	John W. McCormack (incumbent)	86,618	77.13
Republican	Henry J. Allen	25,678	22.87
Total votes		112,296	100.00

=== 1940 ===
Massachusetts's 12th congressional district election, 1940
Party	Candidate	Votes	%
Democratic	John W. McCormack (incumbent)	97,588	78.14
Republican	Henry J. Allen	27,302	21.86
Total votes		124,890	100.00

=== 1942 ===
Massachusetts's 12th congressional district election, 1942
Party	Candidate	Votes	%
Democratic	John W. McCormack (incumbent)	76,043	78.68
Republican	Francis P. O'Neill	20,600	21.32
Total votes		96,643	100.00

=== 1944 ===
Massachusetts's 12th congressional district election, 1944
Party	Candidate	Votes	%
Democratic	John W. McCormack (incumbent)	97,469	75.76
Republican	Henry J. Allen	31,178	24.24
Total votes		128,647	100.00

=== 1946 ===
Massachusetts's 12th congressional district election, 1946
Party	Candidate	Votes	%
Democratic	John W. McCormack (incumbent)	92,622	100.00
Total votes		92,622	100.00

=== 1948 ===
Massachusetts's 12th congressional district election, 1948
Party	Candidate	Votes	%
Democratic	John W. McCormack (incumbent)	125,015	100.00
Total votes		125,015	100.00

=== 1950 ===
Massachusetts's 12th congressional district election, 1950
Party	Candidate	Votes	%
Democratic	John W. McCormack (incumbent)	102,940	84.04
Republican	John J. Biggins	16,746	13.67
Progressive	Florence H. Luscomb	2,205	1.80
Prohibition	Anna B. Campbell	598	0.49
Total votes		84,288	100.00

=== 1952 ===
Massachusetts's 12th congressional district election, 1952
Party	Candidate	Votes	%
Democratic	John W. McCormack (incumbent)	111,986	82.19
Republican	James S. Tremblay	24,271	17.81
Total votes		136,257	100.00

=== 1954 ===
Massachusetts's 12th congressional district election, 1954
Party	Candidate	Votes	%
Democratic	John W. McCormack (incumbent)	79,073	100.00
Total votes		79,073	100.00

=== 1956 ===
Massachusetts's 12th congressional district election, 1956
Party	Candidate	Votes	%
Democratic	John W. McCormack (incumbent)	89,943	82.49
Republican	James S. Tremblay	19,099	17.52
Total votes		109,042	100.00

=== 1958 ===
Massachusetts's 12th congressional district election, 1958
Party	Candidate	Votes	%
Democratic	John W. McCormack (incumbent)	72,573	100.00
Total votes		72,573	100.00

=== 1960 ===
Massachusetts's 12th congressional district election, 1960
Party	Candidate	Votes	%
Democratic	John W. McCormack (incumbent)	86,057	100.00
Total votes		86,057	100.00

=== 1962 ===
Massachusetts's 9th congressional district election, 1962
Party	Candidate	Votes	%
Democratic	John W. McCormack (incumbent)	105,565	100.00
Total votes		105,565	100.00

=== 1964 ===
Massachusetts's 9th congressional district election, 1964
Party	Candidate	Votes	%
Democratic	John W. McCormack (incumbent)	118,385	80.33
Republican	Jack E. Molesworth	21,557	14.63
Independent	Noel E. Day	7,440	5.05
Total votes		147,382	100.00

=== 1966 ===
Massachusetts's 9th congressional district election, 1966
Party	Candidate	Votes	%
Democratic	John W. McCormack (incumbent)	87,879	100.00
Total votes		87,879	100.00

=== 1968 ===
Massachusetts's 9th congressional district election, 1968
Party	Candidate	Votes	%
Democratic	John W. McCormack (incumbent)	77,347	82.94
Republican	Alan C. Freeman	15,906	17.06
Total votes		93,253	100.00

== Speaker of the House ==
=== 1962 election ===
1962 special election for speaker
Party	Candidate	Votes	%
Democratic	John W. McCormack (MA 9)	248	59.90
Republican	Charles A. Halleck (IN 2)	166	40.10
Total votes		414	100
Votes necessary		208	>50

=== 1963 election ===
1963 election for speaker
Party	Candidate	Votes	%
Democratic	John W. McCormack (MA 9) (incumbent)	256	59.12
Republican	Charles A. Halleck (IN 2)	175	40.42
—	Present	2	0.46
Total votes		433	100
Votes necessary		217	>50

===1965 election===

1965 election for speaker
Party	Candidate	Votes	%
Democratic	John W. McCormack (MA 9) (incumbent)	289	67.52
Republican	Gerald Ford (MI 5)	139	32.48
Total votes		428	100
Votes necessary		215	>50

=== 1967 election ===
1967 election for speaker
Party	Candidate	Votes	%
Democratic	John W. McCormack (MA 9) (incumbent)	246	56.94
Republican	Gerald Ford (MI 5)	186	43.06
Total votes		432	100
Votes necessary		217	>50

=== 1969 election ===
1969 election for speaker
Party	Candidate	Votes	%
Democratic	John W. McCormack (MA 9) (incumbent)	241	56.31
Republican	Gerald Ford (MI 5)	187	43.69
Total votes		428	100
Votes necessary		215	>50

== Sources ==
- "Congressional Record (Bound Edition)". govinfo.gov. Washington, D.C.: United States Government Publishing Office.
- Heitshusen, Valerie (September 14, 2023). Speakers of the House: Elections, 1913–2023 (Report). Congressional Research Service.
