= 1955 State of the Union Address =

Speech by US President Dwight D. Eisenhower

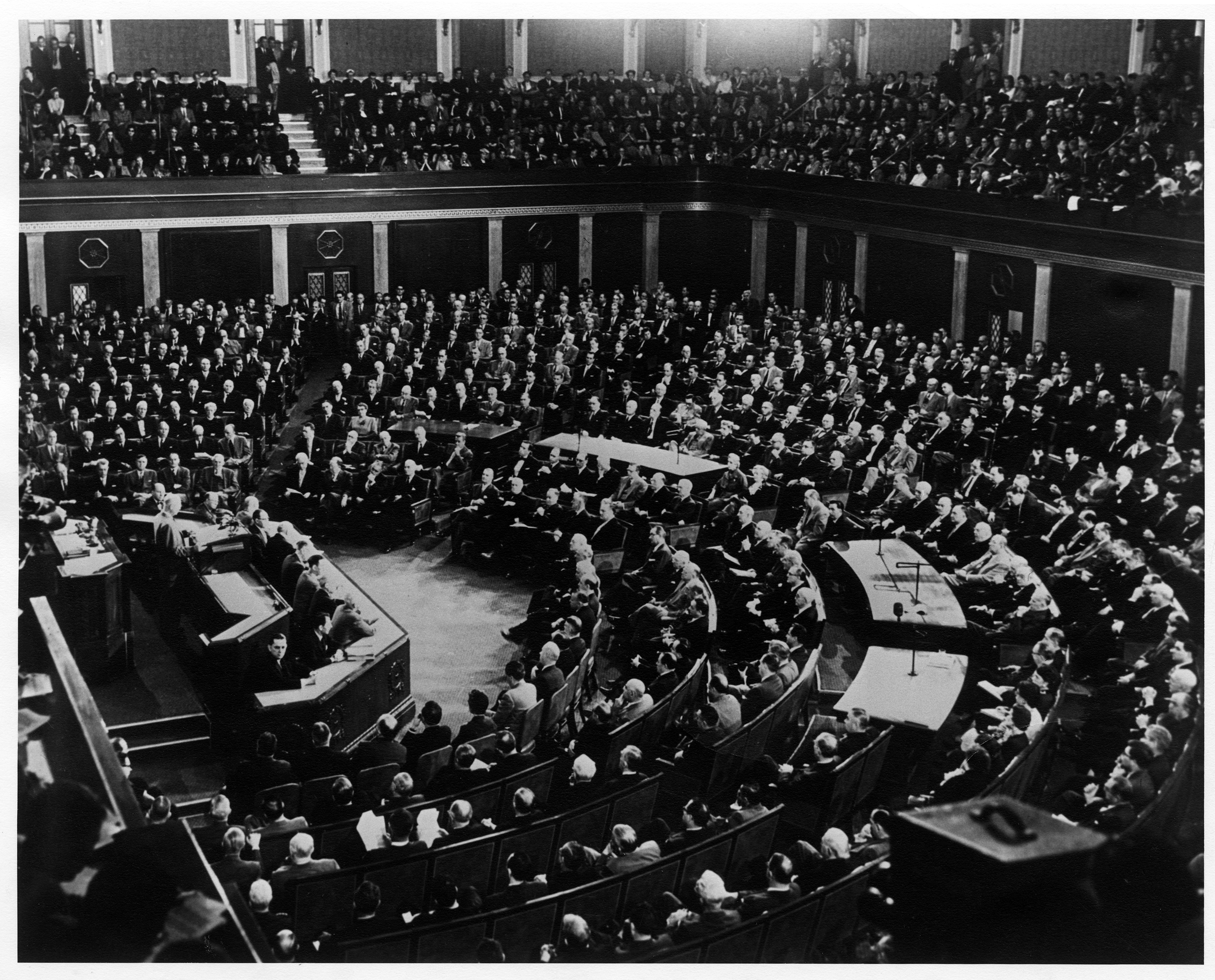
- Date: January 6, 1955
- Time: 12:30 p.m. EST
- Duration: 53 minutes
- Venue: House Chamber, United States Capitol
- Location: Washington, D.C.; 38°53′23″N 77°00′32″W
- Type: State of the Union Address
- Participants: Dwight D. Eisenhower; Richard Nixon; Sam Rayburn
- Previous: 1954 State of the Union Address
- Next: 1956 State of the Union Address

The 1955 State of the Union Address was given by the 34th president of the United States, Dwight D. Eisenhower, on Thursday, January 6, 1955, to the 84th United States Congress. He said, "Every citizen wants to give full expression to his God-given talents and abilities and to have the recognition and respect accorded under our religious and political traditions." He also said, "To protect our nations and our peoples from the catastrophe of a "nuclear holocaust", free nations must maintain countervailing military power to persuade the Communists of the futility of seeking their ends through aggression." He is referring to what seemed to be the high likelihood of nuclear warfare of the time. He ended with, "And so, I know with all my heart--and I deeply believe that all Americans know--that, despite the anxieties of this divided world, our faith, and the cause in which we all believe, will surely prevail."

This State of the Union Address was Eisenhower's longest in terms of word count at 7,250 words for a spoken address (though his written 1956 address was longer), but it was his second longest in terms of length of delivery, clocking in at 53 minutes while his first State of the Union Address, mostly due to frequent applause, clocked in at 56 minutes. At the end of his speech, Eisenhower apologized for its length, stating, "And now my friends, my apologies for the length of this address," and little later in the recording he is again heard saying, "Sorry to keep you so long!" to someone in the background.

== See also ==
- 1954 United States elections

| Preceded by 1954 State of the Union Address | State of the Union addresses 1955 | Succeeded by 1956 State of the Union Address |
