= 1957 State of the Union Address =

Speech by US President Dwight D. Eisenhower

- Date: January 10, 1957
- Time: 12:30 p.m. EST
- Duration: 33 minutes
- Venue: House Chamber, United States Capitol
- Location: Washington, D.C.; 38°53′23″N 77°00′32″W
- Type: State of the Union Address
- Participants: Dwight D. Eisenhower; Richard Nixon; Sam Rayburn
- Previous: 1956 State of the Union Address
- Next: 1958 State of the Union Address

The 1957 State of the Union Address was given by Dwight D. Eisenhower, the 34th president of the United States, on Thursday, January 10, 1957, to the 85th United States Congress in the chamber of the United States House of Representatives. It was Eisenhower's sixth State of the Union Address. Presiding over this joint session was House speaker Sam Rayburn, accompanied by Vice President Richard Nixon, in his capacity as the president of the Senate. The speech was broadcast live over both radio and television.

Eisenhower's speech covered the threats posed by the Soviet Union and communism more generally around the world, calling for US troops to be used, if need be, to counter any expansion of communism into the Middle East. On the domestic side, Eisenhower warned of inflation "if the government might become profligate in its expenditures," calling on the government to "live within its means." Eisenhower also addressed the issue of civil rights, calling for the enactment of what later became the Civil Rights Act of 1957.

Eisenhower closed his speech by appealing to the Declaration of Independence and its statement of inalienable rights:

When our forefathers prepared the immortal document that proclaimed our independence, they asserted that every individual is endowed by his Creator with certain inalienable rights. As we gaze back through history to that date, it is clear that our nation has striven to live up to this declaration, applying it to nations as well as to individuals. Today we proudly assert that the government of the United States is still committed to this concept, both in its activities at home and abroad. The purpose is Divine; the implementation is human. Our country and its government have made mistakes—human mistakes. They have been of the head—not of the heart. And it is still true that the great concept of the dignity of all men, alike created in the image of the Almighty, has been the compass by which we have tried and are trying to steer our course.

This was Eisenhower's shortest State of the Union Address, both in time of delivery at 33 minutes and in word count at just over 4,000.

Senate Majority Leader Lyndon B. Johnson called Eisenhower's speech "a comprehensive and thoughtful analysis of the problems which confront our people."

Preceded by 1956 State of the Union Address	State of the Union addresses 1957	Succeeded by 1958 State of the Union Address
