= 1958 State of the Union Address =

Speech by US President Dwight D. Eisenhower

- Date: January 9, 1958
- Time: 12:30 p.m. EST
- Duration: 44 minutes
- Venue: House Chamber, United States Capitol
- Location: Washington, D.C.; 38°53′23″N 77°00′32″W
- Type: State of the Union Address
- Participants: Dwight D. Eisenhower; Richard Nixon; Sam Rayburn
- Previous: 1957 State of the Union Address
- Next: 1959 State of the Union Address

The 1958 State of the Union Address was given by Dwight D. Eisenhower, the 34th president of the United States, on Thursday, January 9, 1958, to the 85th United States Congress in the chamber of the United States House of Representatives. It was Eisenhower's sixth State of the Union Address. Presiding over this joint session was House speaker Sam Rayburn, accompanied by Vice President Richard Nixon, in his capacity as the president of the Senate.

Eisenhower's theme for his address was "safety through strength." He argued that the main threat to the safety and security of the United States was "communist imperialism" led by the Soviet Union which was "waging total cold war." He touted not only support for national defense initiatives but also for giving economic aid to allies of the United States to counter the "economic offensive" waged by the Soviet Union. Eisenhower closed his speech as follows:

My friends of the Congress: The world is waiting to see how wisely and decisively a free representative government will now act.... I am fully confident that the response of the Congress and of the American people will make this time of test a time of honor. Mankind then will see more clearly than ever that the future belongs, not to the concept of the regimented atheistic state, but to the people—the God-fearing, peace-loving people of all the world.

Preceded by 1957 State of the Union Address	State of the Union addresses 1958	Succeeded by 1959 State of the Union Address
