= January 30, 1961 State of the Union Address =

Speech by US President John F. Kennedy

January 30, 1961, State of the Union Address
- Date: January 30, 1961
- Duration: 43 minutes
- Venue: House Chamber, United States Capitol
- Location: Washington, D.C.; 38°53′23″N 77°00′32″W
- Type: State of the Union Address
- Participants: John F. Kennedy; Lyndon B. Johnson; Sam Rayburn
- Previous: January 12, 1961 State of the Union Address
- Next: 1962 State of the Union Address

The second 1961 State of the Union Address was given by John F. Kennedy, the 35th president of the United States, on Monday, January 30, 1961, to the 87th United States Congress in the chamber of the United States House of Representatives. It was Kennedy's first State of the Union Address, which was delivered only 18 days after outgoing President Dwight D. Eisenhower delivered his final State of the Union Address in writing. Presiding over this joint session was House speaker Sam Rayburn, accompanied by Vice President Lyndon B. Johnson, in his capacity as the president of the Senate.

In the speech, Kennedy discussed his major goals for the next four years of his term. After calling the state of the American economy "disturbing" and "in trouble" as a result of the Recession of 1958, he discussed his plans for economic growth for the United States. He also urged attentiveness to the rising communist movements in China and Latin America. Kennedy described the state of the world as one fraught with danger and uncertainty, but he expressed confidence in the commitment of American government, the United Nations, and the notion of American freedom which he believed would serve as an inspiration during the Cold War. Kennedy closed his speech by noting that January 30 was the birthday of former President Franklin D. Roosevelt, and he quoted from the conclusion to Roosevelt's 1945 State of the Union Address:

In the words of a great President, whose birthday we honor today, closing his final State of the Union Message sixteen years ago, "We pray that we may be worthy of the unlimited opportunities that God has given us."

Preceded by January 12, 1961 State of the Union Address	State of the Union addresses January 30, 1961	Succeeded by 1962 State of the Union Address
