= 1954 State of the Union Address =

Speech by US President Dwight D. Eisenhower

- Date: January 7, 1954
- Time: 12:30 p.m. EST
- Duration: 52 minutes
- Venue: House Chamber, United States Capitol
- Location: Washington, D.C.; 38°53′23″N 77°00′32″W
- Type: State of the Union Address
- Participants: Dwight D. Eisenhower; Richard Nixon; Joseph W. Martin Jr.
- Previous: February 1953 State of the Union Address
- Next: 1955 State of the Union Address

The 1954 State of the Union Address was given by Dwight D. Eisenhower, the 34th president of the United States, on Thursday, January 7, 1954, to the 83rd United States Congress in the chamber of the United States House of Representatives. It was Eisenhower's second State of the Union Address. Presiding over this joint session was House speaker Joseph W. Martin Jr., accompanied by Vice President Richard Nixon, in his capacity as the president of the Senate. This address was broadcast live on both radio and television.

Eisenhower began his speech by noting that the Korean War was over, but he also stated the threat from communism was not over:

American freedom is threatened so long as the world Communist conspiracy exists in its present scope, power and hostility. More closely than ever before, American freedom is interlocked with the freedom of other people. In the unity of the free world lies our best chance to reduce the Communist threat without war. In the task of maintaining this unity and strengthening all its parts, the greatest responsibility falls naturally on those who, like ourselves, retain the most freedom and strength. We shall, therefore, continue to advance the cause of freedom on foreign fronts.

For domestic issues, Eisenhower asked Congress to reduce spending but to forego tax cuts for 1954.

In the last part of his address, Eisenhower called for several measures which were not accomplished by the 83rd United States Congress but which were later enacted: First, he called for the citizens of the District of Columbia to have the right to vote, which was later enacted with the ratification of the Twenty-third Amendment to the United States Constitution in 1961. Second, he called for Hawaii to be admitted to the union, which would happen in 1959. Third, he called for the right to vote to be extended to those 18 years of age or older, arguing that if they were old enough to serve in the armed forces, then they should be allowed to "participate in the political process." This was accomplished just under 20 years later with the ratification of the Twenty-sixth Amendment to the United States Constitution in 1971.

Eisenhower then closed his speech saying that Americans must reject materialism and look to transcendent aims to preserve peace and prosperity:

No government can inoculate its people against the fatal materialism that plagues our age. Happily, our people, though blessed with more material goods than any people in history, have always reserved their first allegiance to the kingdom of the spirit, which is the true source of that freedom we value above all material things. But a government can try, as ours tries, to sense the deepest aspirations of the people, and to express them in political action at home and abroad. So long as action and aspiration humbly and earnestly seek favor in the sight of the Almighty, there is no end to America's forward road; there is no obstacle on it she will not surmount in her march toward a lasting peace in a free and prosperous world.

After he was done speaking, Eisenhower spent the rest of the afternoon playing golf.

Preceded by 1953 State of the Union Address	State of the Union addresses 1954	Succeeded by 1955 State of the Union Address
