= 1956 State of the Union Address =

Speech by US President Dwight D. Eisenhower

- Date: January 5, 1956
- Time: 12:00 p.m. EST (Note: This represents the time that Eisenhower's written message was read separately to both houses of Congress.)
- Venue: House Chamber and Senate Chamber, United States Capitol
- Location: Washington, D.C.
- Type: State of the Union Address
- Participants: Dwight D. Eisenhower; Richard Nixon; Sam Rayburn
- Format: Written
- Previous: 1955 State of the Union Address
- Next: 1957 State of the Union Address

The 1956 State of the Union Address was delivered by Dwight D. Eisenhower, the 34th president of the United States, on Friday, January 5, 1956, to both houses of the 84th United States Congress in written format. Eisenhower did not deliver a speech before a joint session of Congress because he had suffered a major heart attack four months prior and was recovering in Key West, Florida. Instead, Eisenhower opted to pre-record remarks from his office at the Naval Air Station in Key West summarizing his State of the Union Address which were broadcast to the nation in the evening on January 5.

In his address, he said, "There has been broad progress in fostering the energies of our people, in providing greater opportunity for the satisfaction of their needs, and in fulfilling their demands for the strength and security of the Republic."

The President noted the end of the Korean War and elaborated at length about the threat of communism in the world.

In domestic matters, the President advocated for effective policymaking, with assistance from the National Housing Act, to spur homebuilding. The President also recommended prompt statehood for Hawaii, which would become in a state later in 1959.

The President closed with a message of hope:

To conclude: the vista before us is bright. The march of science, the expanding economy, the advance in collective security toward a just peace--in this threefold movement our people are creating new standards by which the future of the Republic may be judged. Progress, however, will be realized only as it is more than matched by a continuing growth in the spiritual strength of the nation. Our dedication to moral values must be complete in our dealings abroad and in our relationships among ourselves. We have single-minded devotion to the common good of America. Never must we forget that this means the well-being, the prosperity, the security of all Americans in every walk of life.

== See also ==
- 1956 United States presidential election

Preceded by 1955 State of the Union Address	State of the Union addresses 1956	Succeeded by 1957 State of the Union Address
