= John W. McCormack =

American politician (1891–1980)

John McCormack
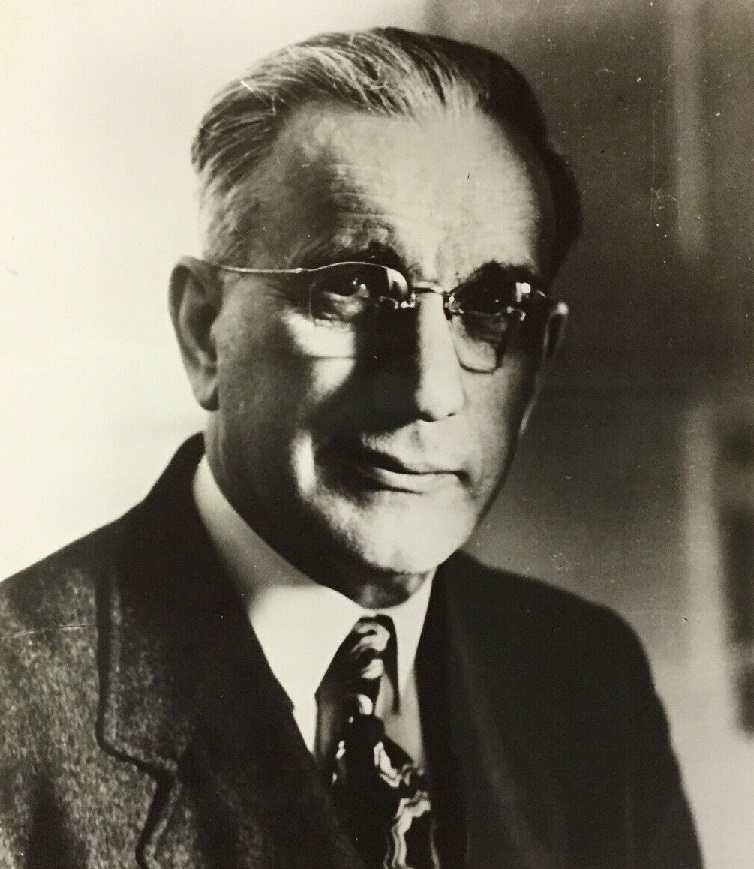
- McCormack in 1955

45th Speaker of the United States House of Representatives
- In office January 10, 1962 – January 3, 1971
- Preceded by: Sam Rayburn
- Succeeded by: Carl Albert
House positions
Leader of the House Democratic Caucus
In office January 10, 1962 – January 3, 1971
Preceded by	Sam Rayburn
Succeeded by	Carl Albert
House Majority Leader
In office January 3, 1955 – January 10, 1962
Deputy	Carl Albert
Preceded by	Charles A. Halleck
Succeeded by	Carl Albert
In office January 3, 1949 – January 3, 1953
Deputy	Percy Priest
Preceded by	Sam Rayburn
Succeeded by	Charles A. Halleck
In office September 16, 1940 – January 3, 1947
Deputy	Patrick J. Boland; Robert Ramspeck; John Sparkman
Preceded by	Sam Rayburn
Succeeded by	Charles A. Halleck
House Minority Whip
In office January 3, 1953 – January 3, 1955
Leader	Sam Rayburn
Preceded by	Leslie C. Arends
Succeeded by	Leslie C. Arends
In office January 3, 1947 – January 3, 1949
Leader	Sam Rayburn
Preceded by	Leslie C. Arends
Succeeded by	Leslie C. Arends

Member of the U.S. House of Representatives from Massachusetts
- In office November 6, 1928 – January 3, 1971
- Preceded by: James A. Gallivan
- Succeeded by: Louise Day Hicks
- Constituency: 12th district (1928–1963); 9th district (1963–1971)

Member of the Massachusetts Senate from the 3rd Suffolk district
- In office January 3, 1923 – November 6, 1928
- Preceded by: William H. McDonnell
- Succeeded by: Henry Parkman Jr.

Member of the Massachusetts House of Representatives from the 11th Suffolk district
- In office January 7, 1920 – January 3, 1923 Serving with James B. Troy
- Preceded by: Patrick M. Costello, Michael J. Reidy
- Succeeded by: Hugh H. Garrity, Walter B. Grant

Personal details
- Born: December 21, 1891 Boston, Massachusetts, US
- Died: November 22, 1980 (aged 88) Dedham, Massachusetts, US
- Resting place: Saint Joseph Cemetery; West Roxbury, Massachusetts
- Party: Democratic
- Spouse: Harriet Joyce (m. 1920; died 1971)
- Relatives: Edward J. McCormack Jr. (nephew)
- Profession: Politician

Military service
- Allegiance: United States
- Branch/service: US Army
- Years of service: 1918
- Rank: Sergeant Major
- Unit: 14th Company, 151st Depot Brigade; Infantry Replacement Center, Camp Lee, Virginia
- Battles/wars: World War I
- John W. McCormack's voice McCormack reacts to the death of John F. Kennedy; Recorded November 22, 1963

John William McCormack (December 21, 1891 – November 22, 1980) was an American politician from Boston, Massachusetts who served as the 45th speaker of the United States House of Representatives from 1962 until his retirement in 1971. McCormack served in the United States Army during World War I, and afterwards in the Massachusetts State Senate before winning election to the United States House of Representatives.

McCormack's congressional career was highlighted by his support for the New Deal measures undertaken to combat the Great Depression, U.S. involvement in World War II, and support for the Great Society programs of the 1960s, including civil rights, education, and health care for the elderly. A staunch anti-communist, McCormack supported U.S. involvement in the Vietnam War. His support for the war and the seniority system in Congress caused increasing numbers of younger members to challenge his leadership; McCormack survived a 1969 contest with Mo Udall for the Speakership. He did not run for reelection to his House seat in 1970, and retired to his home in Boston. He later resided at a Dedham nursing home, where he died in 1980.

At 42 years and 58 days, as of 2026, McCormack's service in the U.S. House ranks 21st in terms of uninterrupted time and 40th in total. He is the longest-serving member of the U.S. House in Massachusetts history.

== Early life ==
McCormack was born in Boston on December 21, 1891. He was the son of Joseph H. McCormack, a hod carrier and native of Prince Edward Island, Canada, and his wife Mary Ellen (née O'Brien) McCormack of Boston (1861–1913). He said he was one of 12 children, several of whom died as children or young adults. In fact, Mary Ellen McCormack carried eight children to term, and six lived long enough to be counted in the census or included in other records. John McCormack's older siblings Patrick (d. 1911), Catherine (d. 1906), and James (d. 1906) died at ages 24, 19 and 17, respectively. His brother Edward ("Knocko") died in Boston in 1963 at age 67. McCormack's brother Donald died in Texas in 1966 at the age of 65. McCormack also had a half brother named Harry from his father's first marriage; Harry died on Prince Edward Island at age 18 in 1902.

McCormack said for most of his life that his father died when McCormack was 13; other sources indicate that his father actually left the family and moved to Waldoboro, Maine, where he worked in the local granite quarries. He died in 1929, and was buried in a pauper's grave at Waldoboro Rural Cemetery.

McCormack attended the John Andrew Grammar School through the eighth grade. He then left school to help support his family, initially working for $3 a week (about $95 in 2021) as an errand boy for a brokerage firm. McCormack and his brothers also managed a large newspaper delivery route for $11 a week (about $347 in 2021). He later left the brokerage for the office of attorney William T. Way, where he received a 50-cent a week increase. He began to study law with Way, passed the Massachusetts bar exam at age 21, and was admitted to the bar despite not having gone to high school or college. He was also an active member of the Benevolent and Protective Order of Elks.

== Start of political career ==
As a young man, McCormack began his involvement in politics by making campaign speeches on behalf of local Democratic candidates. In May 1917, McCormack was elected to serve as a member of the Massachusetts Constitutional Convention, representing the 11th Suffolk District of the Massachusetts House of Representatives.

== World War I ==
In June 1918, McCormack enlisted in the United States Army for World War I, and was initially posted to Camp Devens, Massachusetts, as a member of the 14th Company of the 151st Depot Brigade. After completing his initial training, McCormack was assigned to the Infantry Replacement Center at Camp Lee, Virginia, to receive officer training. McCormack advanced through the ranks from private to sergeant major, and was attending Officer Training School at Camp Lee when the Armistice occurred. He was discharged in late November, following the end of the war.

== Continued political career ==
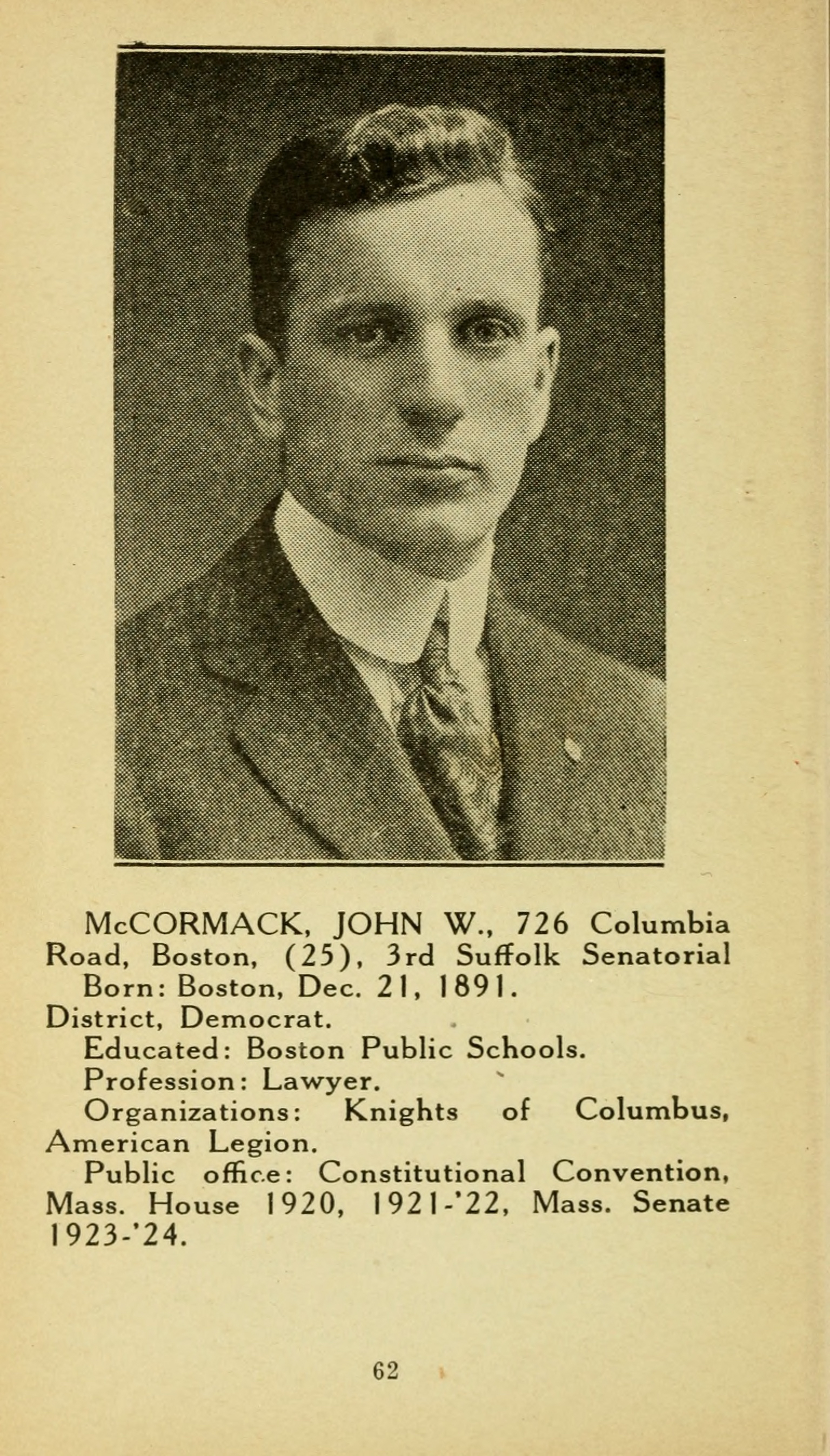
McCormack as a state senator in 1923

After the war McCormack practiced law and resumed his political career. He soon entered the state legislature, representing the 11th Suffolk District in the House from 1920 to 1922 and serving in the Senate from 1923 to 1926, including holding the leadership position of Democratic floor leader in 1925 and 1926. In 1926 he made an unsuccessful primary election run against incumbent Congressman James A. Gallivan. McCormack made a favorable impression in a losing cause, leaving him well positioned for a future race. He resumed practicing law, and built a successful career as a trial attorney, which enabled him to enjoy an income that reached $30,000 a year (approximately $400,000 in 2016).

McCormack was selected as a delegate to every state Democratic convention from 1920 until his retirement. In addition, he was a delegate to the Democratic National Conventions of 1932, 1940, 1944, and 1948.

== Congressional career ==
McCormack's opportunity to run for Congress again came after Gallivan died in 1928. That November McCormack won both the special election to complete Gallivan's term in the U.S. House as well as the general election for a full term. He was reelected 20 times, initially from the 12th District, and from the re-numbered 9th after 1963. McCormack usually won reelection without difficulty, and he served in the House from November 6, 1928, to January 3, 1971 (the 70th to 91st Congresses). He did not run for reelection in 1970.

=== Early years in Congress ===
At the beginning of his House career, McCormack served on the Committee on Territories, In his second term, Speaker John Nance Garner appointed McCormack to the powerful Ways and Means Committee, and he served there until 1941.

McCormack maintained a consistently liberal voting record throughout his Congressional career, including support for the New Deal. In 1934, he served as chairman of the Special Committee on Un-American Activities, known as the McCormack-Dickstein Committee, which investigated Communist and Nazi propaganda and recruitment efforts in the United States prior to World War II.

=== Ascension to House leadership ===
When Sam Rayburn became Speaker in 1940, he backed McCormack for majority leader, a key factor in McCormack's victory over Clifton A. Woodrum. For the next 21 years, McCormack was the second-ranking Democrat in the House; he served as majority leader with Rayburn as Speaker when Democrats had the majority (1939–1947, 1951–1953, 1955–1961), and as minority whip with Rayburn as minority leader when the Republicans controlled the House (1947–1949, 1953–1955).

Always staunch in his opposition to both Communism and Fascism, he played a key role in extending the military draft, just before the attack on Pearl Harbor, when isolationist sentiment and opposition to U.S. involvement in World War II were still strong.

In March 1946, McCormack spoke at a rally of 20,000 participants in Madison Square Garden, protesting against Britain's recent reversal of its pro-Zionist policies in Mandatory Palestine. McCormack accused Britain of using its Empire "against those stoned survivors, whom Hitler did not quite succeed in exterminating."

He was chairman of the Select Committee on Astronautics and Space Exploration in the 85th Congress (1957 to 1959). In that role, he introduced and secured passage of the bill that created the National Aeronautics and Space Administration (NASA).

McCormack voted in favor of the Civil Rights Act of 1957, and voted in favor of the initial House resolution for the Civil Rights Act of 1960 on March 24, 1960, but did not vote on the Senate amendment to the bill on April 21, 1960.

=== Speaker of the House ===
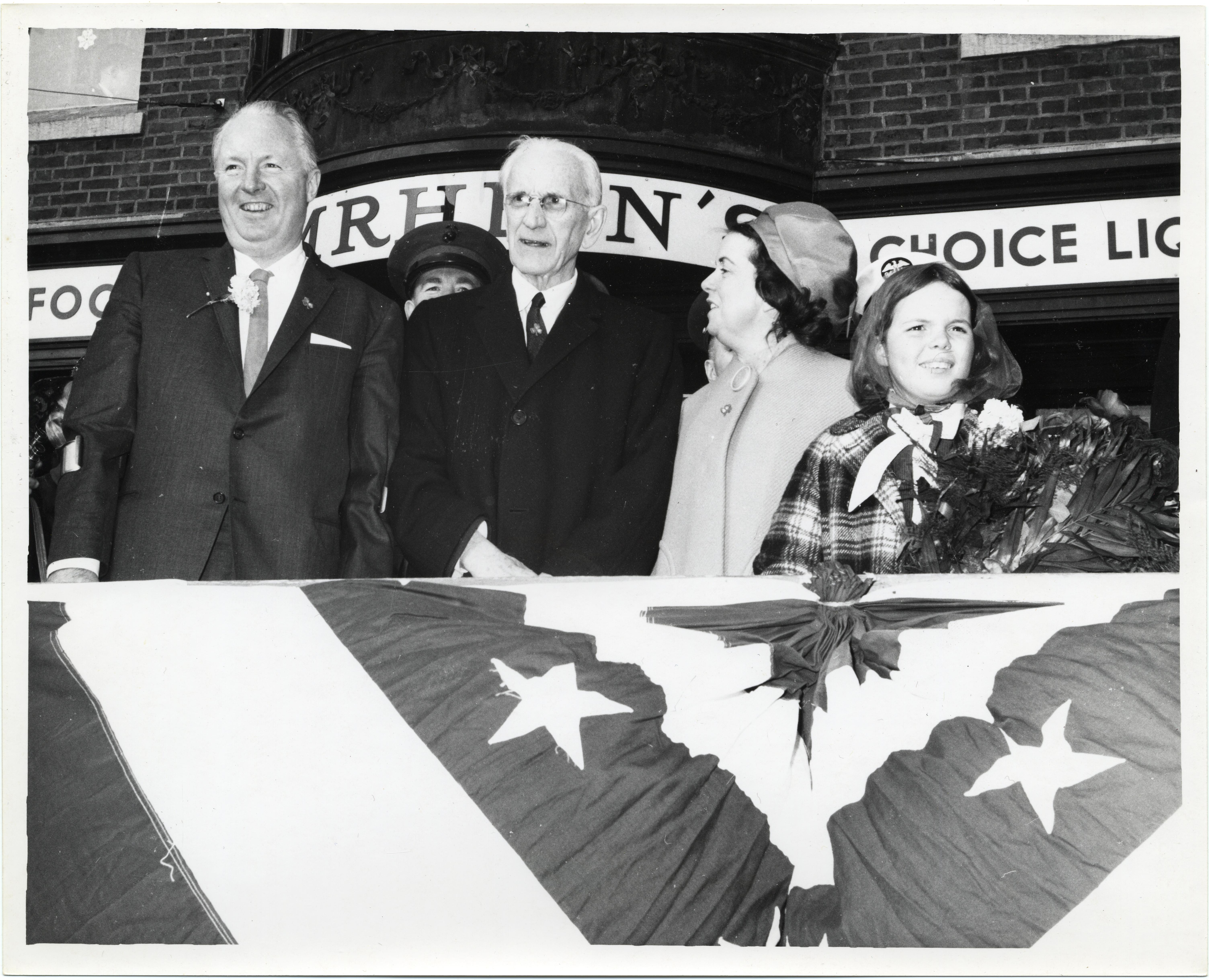
McCormack with Boston Mayor John F. Collins (1960–1968) during a St. Patrick's Day parade in South Boston.

After Rayburn's death in November 1961, McCormack acted as Speaker until winning election to the post in early 1962; he served from January 1962 until retiring from the House in 1971. McCormack's nine years as Speaker were dominated by House passage of Great Society legislation during the administration of Lyndon B. Johnson, including laws to expand civil rights, access to public education, and health care for the elderly.

McCormack was the first Catholic to be elected Speaker, and some critics complained that his religion sometimes showed in his leadership qualities. As an example, during the 1961 debate on federal aid to schools, McCormack insisted that church schools should be included, and the bill died because of disagreement over this issue. In 1963, McCormack changed his position, and oversaw passage of an aid bill devoted primarily to public schools.

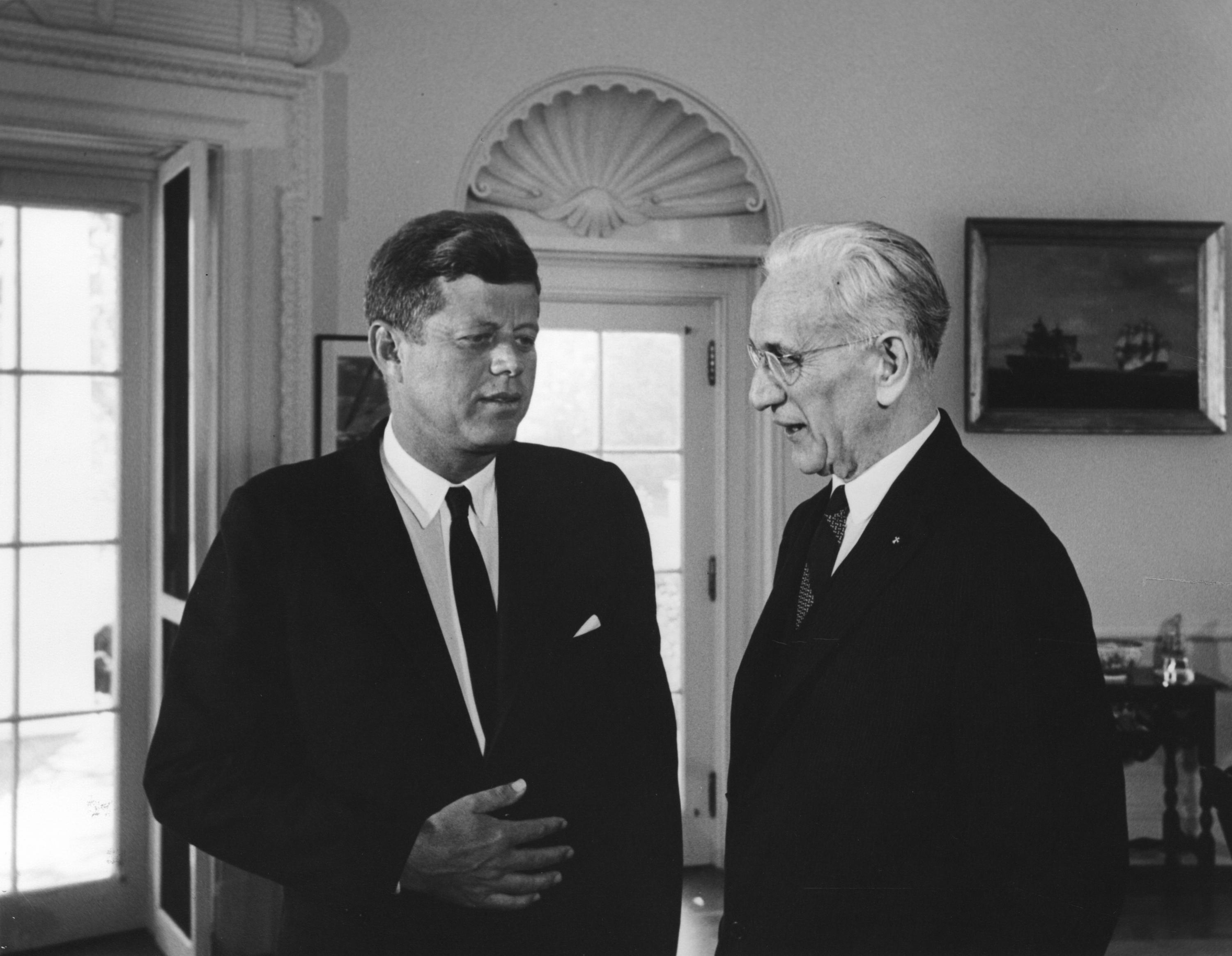
McCormack with President John F. Kennedy in 1962

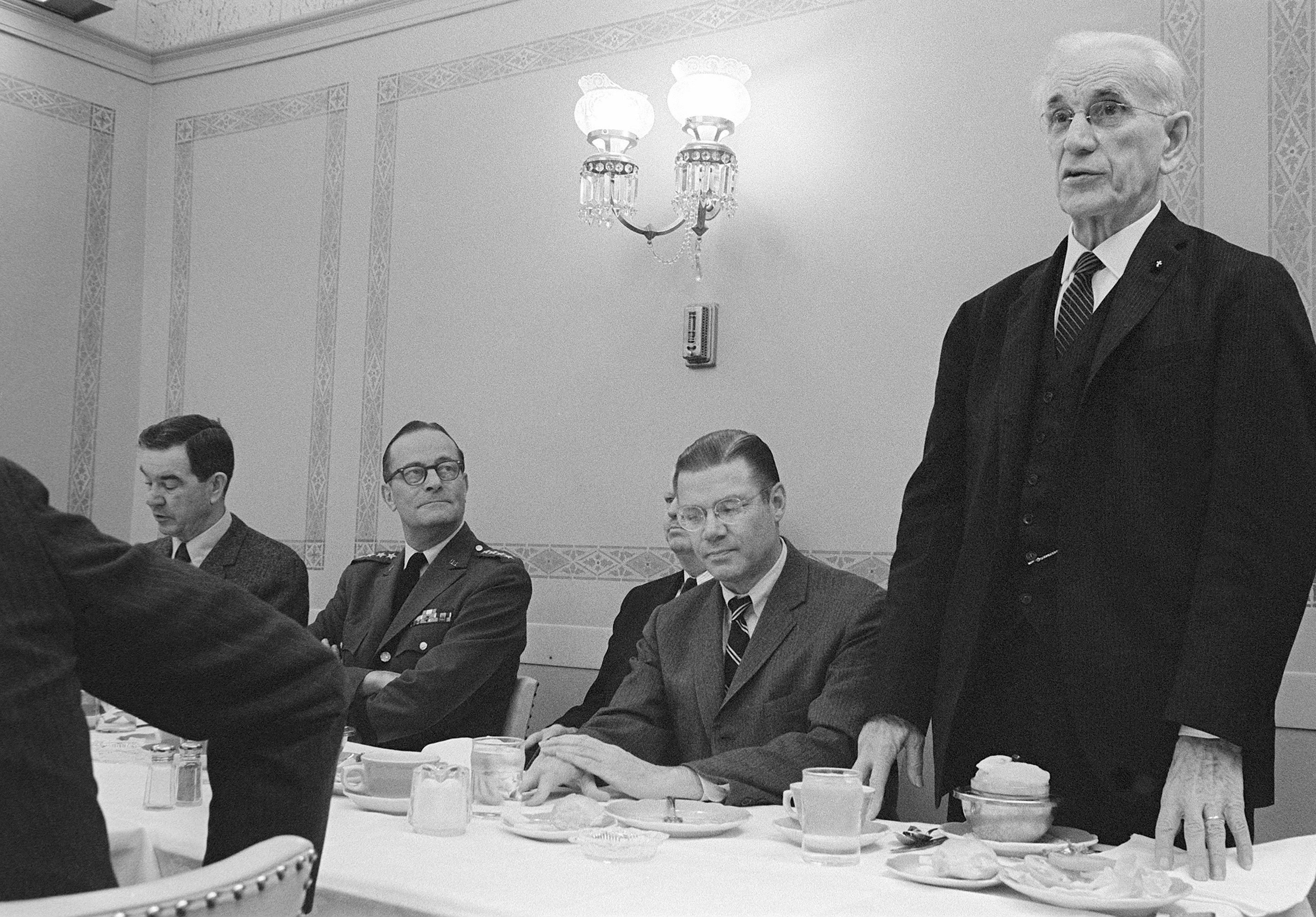
McCormack (standing) speaking at a Department of Defense luncheon, February 1966

The latter part of McCormack's tenure increasingly focused on the debate over the Vietnam War, which he supported. McCormack's demeanor changed during these years and he reminded some observers of a kindly elder relative attempting to provide wisdom and guidance to unruly younger family members. According to House members, McCormack's strength was his personal consideration of members, which inspired them to return his affection and sparked a desire to work with him. His weakness was that the seniority system created entrenched committee chairmen who wielded great power in the House, but could not be controlled by the Speaker. As Speaker, McCormack pursued a national agenda; he was proud of fighting for passage of farm bills, though he said he did not have "more than five flower pots in my whole district."

Between the assassination of President John F. Kennedy on November 22, 1963, and the swearing-in of Hubert Humphrey as Vice President on January 20, 1965, McCormack was first in the line of succession. He thus received Secret Service protection, though, according to historian William Manchester, McCormack refused that protection and went without it for the entire 14-month interim before Humphrey's inauguration.

In January 1969, Arizona representative Morris Udall attempted to unseat McCormack as Speaker. In 1970, the political attacks increased and several representatives urged McCormack to step down because of his age. Jerome R. Waldie of California asked a party caucus to declare a lack of confidence in his leadership, which it refused to do. McCormack decided not to run for reelection to the House in early 1970, but kept his decision secret until he announced it publicly in May. McCormack was succeeded as Representative in 1971 by Louise Day Hicks, and as Speaker by Carl Albert.

== Retirement and death ==
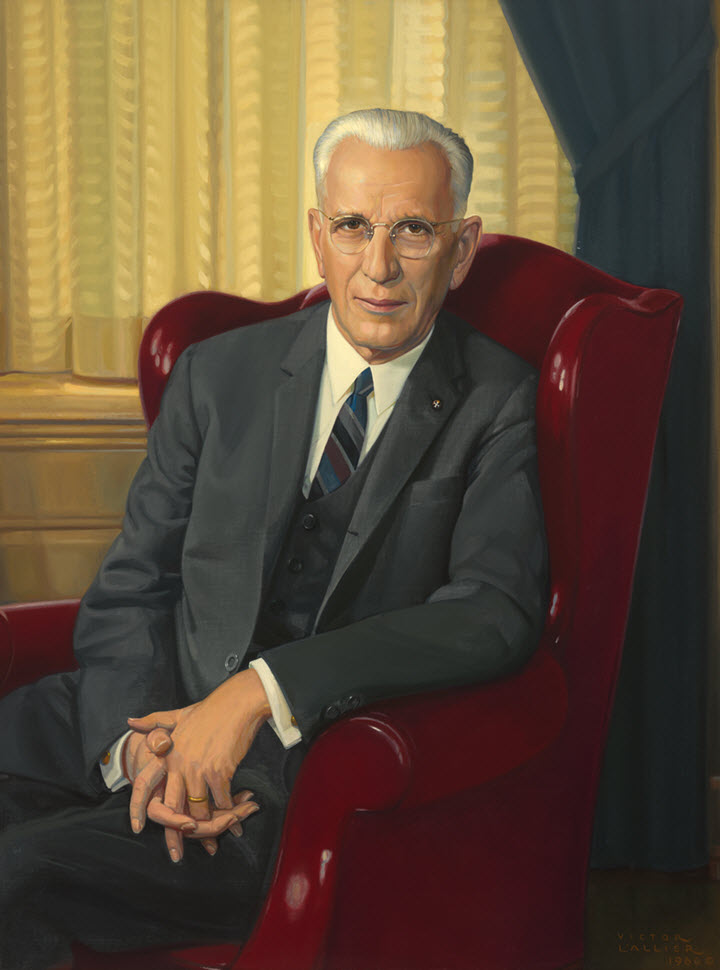
McCormack's official speaker's portrait, 1966

In retirement, McCormack lived in Boston. He died of pneumonia in a Dedham nursing home on November 22, 1980. He was buried at Saint Joseph Cemetery in West Roxbury, Massachusetts.

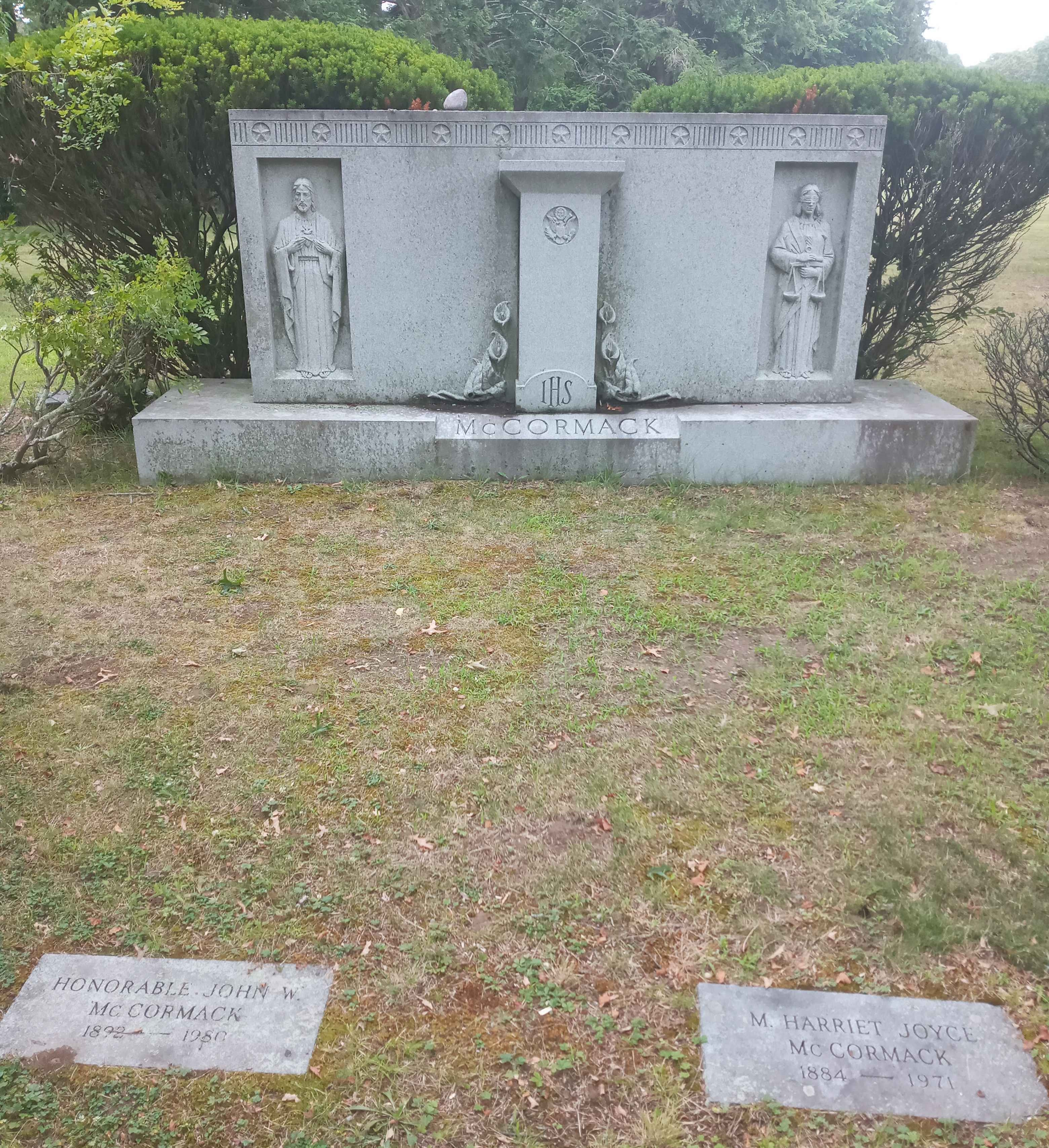
The gravesite of Speaker McCormack

== Legacy ==
In 1983, the University of Massachusetts Boston established the John W. McCormack Institute of Public Affairs. In 1985, the university dedicated John W. McCormack Hall, which was named in McCormack's honor. In 2003, the McCormack Institute was expanded into a graduate school. In 2010, the school expanded its mission again, and it was renamed the McCormack Graduate School of Policy and Global Studies. The McCormack Graduate School's mission currently includes training in social justice, government accountability and transparency, and strengthening democratic institutions.

The John W. McCormack Post Office and Courthouse in Boston was built in the early 1930s, and was renamed in McCormack's honor. It was designated a Boston landmark by the city Landmarks Commission in 1998, and in 2011 it was listed on the National Register of Historic Places.

John W. McCormack Middle School in Dorchester was also named for him.

A Massachusetts state government office building at Ashburton Place in Boston is also named for McCormack.

== Family ==
In 1920, McCormack married Marguerite Harriet Joyce (usually known as Harriet or M. Harriet); she was seven years older than McCormack and pursuing a career as an opera singer, a vocation she gave up after their wedding. The McCormacks had no children. While Congress was in session, they lived at the Washington Hotel.

Stories about McCormack's devotion to his wife became legendary; his friends and colleagues claimed that they always had dinner together, no matter how late McCormack worked, and that they never spent a night apart. McCormack and his wife were devout Roman Catholics, and he was a Knight of Columbus; both were honored by the Vatican in recognition of their work on behalf of the church. Harriet McCormack died at age 87 in December 1971, following a long hospitalization. For more than a year, McCormack had spent every night in an adjoining hospital room.

Edward J. McCormack Jr., the son of McCormack's brother Edward ("Knocko"), served as Massachusetts Attorney General from 1958 to 1963. He was an unsuccessful candidate for the Democratic nomination for United States Senator in 1962, and the unsuccessful Democratic nominee for Governor of Massachusetts in the 1966 election.

== See also ==
- Electoral history of John W. McCormack

== Sources ==
=== Magazines ===
- Nelson, Garrison (December 1, 1999). "Irish Identity Politics: The Reinvention of Speaker John W. McCormack of Boston". New England Journal of Public Policy. Boston, MA: John W. McCormack Institute of Public Affairs.

=== Books ===
- Bridgman, Arthur Milnor (1919). A Souvenir of the Massachusetts Constitutional Convention, Boston, 1917-18-19. Stoughton, MA: A. M. Bridgman.
- Champagne, Anthony (2009). The Austin-Boston Connection: Five Decades of House Democratic Leadership, 1937–1989. College Station, TX: Texas A&M University Press. ISBN 978-1-60344-116-2.
- Tarr, David R.; O'Connor, Ann (199). Congress A-Z. New York, NY: Routledge. ISBN 978-1-57958-125-1.
- Howard, Richard T. (1920), Public Officials of Massachusetts, 1920, Boston, MA: The Boston Review
- Jenkins, Jeffery A.; Stewart, Charles (2013). Fighting for the Speakership: The House and the Rise of Party Government. Princeton, NJ: Princeton University Press. ISBN 978-0-691-11812-3.
- Lapomarda, S.J., Vincent A. (1992). The Knights of Columbus in Massachusetts (second ed.). Norwood, Massachusetts: Knights of Columbus Massachusetts State Council.
- Massachusetts Constitutional Convention (1919). Journal of the Constitutional Convention of the Commonwealth of Massachusetts. Boston, MA: Wright & Potter Printing Co.
- Semple, Robert B. (2003). Four Days in November: The Original Coverage of the John F. Kennedy Assassination by the Staff of the New York Times. New York, NY: St. Martin's Press. ISBN 978-0-312-32161-1.
- Tsiao, Sunny (2008). "Read You Loud and Clear!": The Story of NASA's Spaceflight Tracking and Data Network. Washington, DC: US Government Printing Office. ISBN 978-0-16-080191-4.
- United States House of Representatives (2005). Biographical Directory of the United States Congress, 1774-2005. Washington, DC: US Government Printing Office. ISBN 978-0-16-073176-1.
- United States House of Representatives Committee on Resources (2002). Historical Information of the Committee on Resources and its Predecessor Committees, 1807–2002 (PDF). Washington, DC: US Government Printing Office. Archived from the original (PDF) on February 5, 2012.
- Wright, Paul M. (April 26, 1985). Biography, John W. McCormack: Prepared for the Dedication of John W. McCormack Hall at the University of Massachusetts at Boston. Boston, MA: University of Massachusetts at Boston.
- Wasniewski, Matthew Andrew (2006). Women in Congress, 1917–2006. Washington, DC: US Government Printing Office. p. 460. ISBN 978-0-16-076753-1.

=== Newspapers ===
- "E. J. McCormack Dies; Speaker's Brother". Desert Sun. Palm Springs, CA. United Press International. November 18, 1963.
- "Speaker McCormack's Brother Dies". The Express. Losk Haven, PA. Associated Press. January 8, 1966.
- Lyons, Richard L. (November 23, 1980). "Ex-House Speaker John McCormack Dies". The Washington Post. Washington, DC.
- Long, Tom (February 28, 1997). "Edward J. McCormack Jr., 73; influential politician, lawyer". The Boston Globe. Boston, MA. Archived from the original on April 11, 2017 – via HighBeam Research.
- Cash, David W. (December 19, 2016). "The Lasting Legacy of John McCormack". The Boston Globe. Boston, MA.

=== Internet ===
- "Candidate details, McCormack, John W." OurCampaigns.com. Glen Ellyn, IL: Randy Parker.
- "New England Region: John W. McCormack Post Office and Courthouse" (PDF). www.gsa.gov. Washington, DC: US General Services Administration. Archived from the original (PDF) on July 9, 2017.
- Office of Facilities Maintenance and Management (November 2025). "John W. McCormack Building Occupant Handbook". www.mass.gov. Boston, MA: Massachusetts Division of Capital Asset Management and Maintenance.

== Bibliography ==
External videos
- Presentation by Garrison Nelson on John William McCormack: A Political Biography at the Massachusetts Historical Society, September 20, 2017, C-SPAN

- Gordon, Lester I. (1976). John McCormack and the Roosevelt Era (Ph.D. diss.). Boston University. OCLC 48197458.
- Nelson, Garrison (2017). John William McCormack: A Political Biography. Bloomsbury Academic.

U.S. House of Representatives
Preceded by James A. Gallivan	Member of the U.S. House of Representatives from Massachusetts's 12th congressional district 1928–1963	Succeeded by Hastings Keith
Preceded by Hastings Keith	Member of the U.S. House of Representatives from Massachusetts's 9th congressional district 1963–1971	Succeeded by Louise D. Hicks
Preceded by Sam Rayburn	House Majority Leader; 1940–1947	Succeeded by Charles A. Halleck
Preceded by Leslie C. Arends	House Minority Whip; 1947–1949	Succeeded by Leslie C. Arends
Preceded by Charles A. Halleck	House Majority Leader; 1949–1953	Succeeded by Charles A. Halleck
Preceded by Leslie C. Arends	House Minority Whip; 1953–1955	Succeeded by Leslie C. Arends
Preceded by Charles A. Halleck	House Majority Leader; 1955–1962	Succeeded by Carl Albert
New office	Chair of the House Space Committee; 1958–1959	Succeeded by Overton Brooks as Chair of the House Science Committee
Party political offices
Preceded by Sam Rayburn	House Democratic Leader; 1940–1947	Succeeded by Sam Rayburn
Preceded by Sam Rayburn	House Democratic Leader; 1949–1953	Succeeded by Sam Rayburn
Preceded by Sam Rayburn	House Democratic Leader; 1955–1962	Succeeded by Carl Albert
Vacant Title last held by Howard Baker, George H. W. Bush, Peter Dominick, Gerald Ford, Robert Griffin, Thomas Kuchel, Mel Laird, Bob Mathias, George Murphy, Dick Poff, Chuck Percy, Al Quie, Charlotte Reid, Hugh Scott, Bill Steiger, John Tower	Response to the State of the Union address 1970; Served alongside: Donald Fraser, Scoop Jackson, Mike Mansfield, Ed Muskie, Bill Proxmire, Patsy Mink	Succeeded by Mike Mansfield
Political offices
Preceded by Sam Rayburn	Speaker of the U.S. House of Representatives; 1962–1971	Succeeded by Carl Albert
