= Timeline of the James Buchanan presidency =

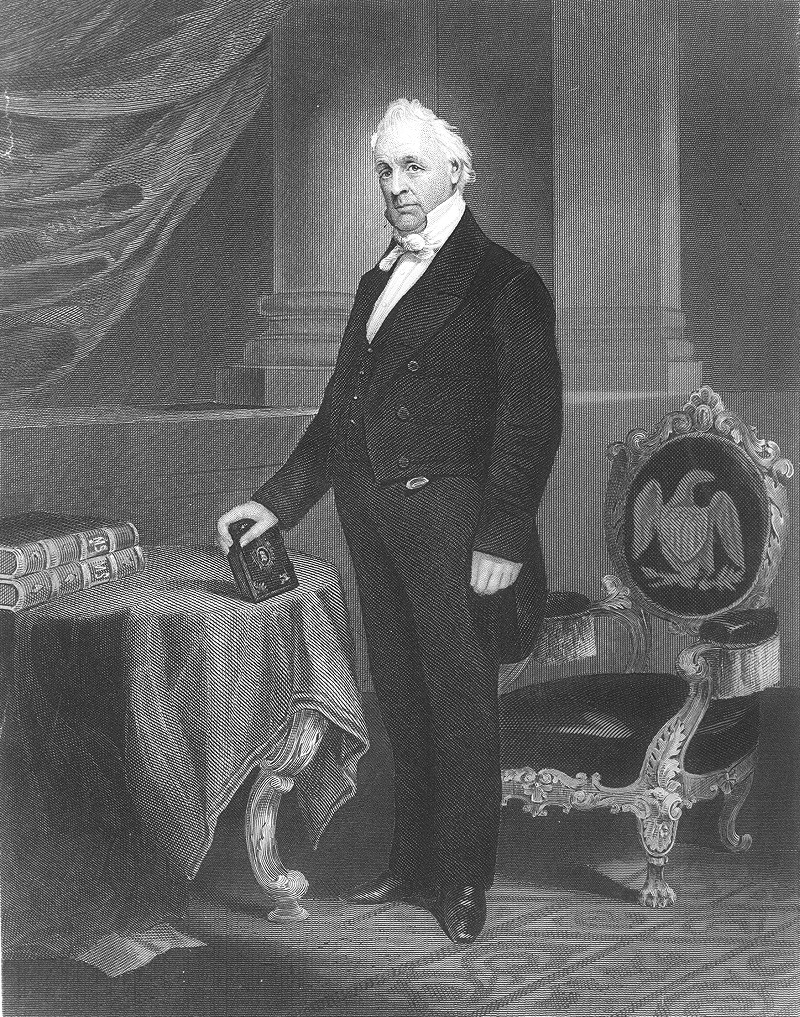
James Buchanan

The presidency of James Buchanan began on March 4, 1857, when James Buchanan was inaugurated as the fifteenth president of the United States and ended on March 4, 1861, after one term.

== 1857 ==
=== March 1857 ===
- March 4 – James Buchanan is inaugurated as the fifteenth president of the United States. During his speech, Buchanan says that slavery is an issue for the Supreme Court to resolve, and he says he will only serve for one term. John C. Breckinridge becomes vice president of the United States.
- March 6
  - The Supreme Court issues its decision in Dred Scott v. Sandford. It rules that black people cannot be American citizens and that the slave Dred Scott cannot sue for his freedom. It also overturns the Compromise of 1850 as unconstitutional.
  - Buchanan's Cabinet is appointed. Lewis Cass, Howell Cobb, John B. Floyd, Jeremiah S. Black, Aaron V. Brown, Isaac Toucey, and Jacob Thompson become secretary of state, secretary of the treasury, secretary of war, attorney general, postmaster general, secretary of the navy, and secretary of the interior, respectively. Secretary of the Navy Isaac Toucey is the only one who will remain in office for Buchanan's entire term.
- March 26 – Buchanan appoints Robert J. Walker as governor of the Kansas Territory. Walker only serves for a short time, because he resigns shortly after expressing opposition to the Lecompton Constitution that would allow slavery when Kansas becomes a state.

=== April 1857 ===
- April 11 – The United States signs a convention with Denmark to end Danish fees on American ships passing through the Danish Straits.

=== June 1857 ===
- June 17 – The United States signs a convention with Japan establishing the rights of American citizens in Japan.

=== July 1857 ===
- July 4 – The United States signs a convention of friendship, commerce, and navigation of whale ships with Peru.

=== August 1857 ===
- August 24 – An 18-month-long financial crisis, the Panic of 1857, is triggered by the failure of several banks.
- August 29 – A constitutional convention is held in the Minnesota Territory.

=== September 1857 ===
- September 7 – As a response to Buchanan's order to remove Mormon leader Brigham Young as governor of Utah, John D. Lee leads a Mormon militia and people of the Paiute to kill about 140 people migrating through Utah to California in the Mountain Meadows Massacre.
- September 24 – The United States signs a treaty with the Pawnee people.

=== October 1857 ===
- October 5 – The 1857 Kansas Territory elections are held in anticipation of statehood. Anti-slavery candidates take control of the Kansas Legislature. Thousands of votes for pro-slavery candidates are discarded as fraudulent.

=== November 1857 ===
- November 5 – The United States signs a treaty with the Seneca people.

=== December 1857 ===
- December 7 – The 35th United States Congress convenes for its first session.
- December 8 – Buchanan delivers the 1857 State of the Union Address.
- December 9 – Buchanan nominates Nathan Clifford to the Supreme Court.
- December 23 – A law is passed to issue Treasury Notes in response to the Panic of 1857.

== 1858 ==
=== January 1858 ===
- January 4 – Kansas votes against the Lecompton Constitution, with 138 in favor and 10,226 opposed.
- January 12 – The Senate confirms Nathan Clifford's nomination to the Supreme Court.

=== February 1858 ===
- February 2 – Buchanan asks Congress to admit Kansas as a state with the Lecompton Constitution.

=== March 1858 ===
- March 12 – The United States signs a treaty with the Ponca people.
- March 23 – The Senate votes in favor of statehood for Kansas under the Lecompton Constitution despite its rejection in Kansas.

=== April 1858 ===
- April 6 – Buchanan issues a proclamation ordering the military to stop the Mormon militias that formed to prevent Brigham Young from being removed as governor of Utah Territory.
- April 19 – The United States signs a treaty with the Sioux people.
- April 24 – John Cadwalader receives his commission for the District Court for the Eastern District of Pennsylvania.

=== May 1858 ===
- May 3 – Asa Biggs receives his commission for the District Court for the Albemarle, Cape Fear, and Pamptico Districts of North Carolina.
- May 4 – The English Bill is passed by Congress as a compromise agreement for Kansas statehood. It has the people of Kansas vote on the Lecompton Constitution and approves statehood if it is adopted.
- May 6 – Edward G. Loring receives his commission for the United States Court of Claims.
- May 11 – Minnesota, a free state, is admitted as the thirty-second state.
- May 13 – The United States signs a treaty of peace, friendship, commerce, and navigation with Bolivia.
- May 30 – Rensselaer Nelson receives his commission for the District Court for the District of Minnesota.

=== June 1858 ===
- June 14 – The 35th United States Congress adjourns from its first session.
- June 18 – The United States signsthe Treaty of Tientsin with China.
- June 19 – The United States signs two treaties with the Sioux people.

=== July 1858 ===
- July 17 – The United States signs a treaty of commerce and navigation with Belgium.
- July 29 – The United States signs a treaty of amity and commerce with Japan.

=== August 1858 ===
- August 2 – Kansas votes against the Lecompton Constitution in its third referendum, with 1,788 in favor and 11,300 opposed.
- August 15 – Queen Victoria of the United Kingdom sends Buchanan a congratulations to inaugurate the completed transatlantic telegraph cable between the two nations.
- August 21 – The first of seven Lincoln–Douglas debates takes place between Abraham Lincoln and Stephen A. Douglas leading up to the 1859 Senate election. Lincoln argues an anti-slavery position and Douglas argues a pro-slavery position.

=== October 1858 ===
- October 20 – The screw sloop USS Lancaster is launched at the Philadelphia Navy Yard.

=== November 1858 ===
- November 22 – The screw sloop USS Hartford is launched at the Boston Navy Yard.

=== December 1858 ===
- December 6
  - The 35th United States Congress convenes for its second session.
  - Buchanan delivers the 1858 State of the Union Address.

== 1859 ==
=== January 1859 ===
- January 7 – Buchanan pocket vetoes a bill to increase the speed of the postal service across the country.
- January 19 – The sloop-of-war USS Wyoming is launched at the Philadelphia Naval Yard.
- January 26 – The screw sloop USS Brooklyn is commissioned after its launch in 1858.

=== February 1859 ===
- February 4 – The United States signs a treaty of friendship, commerce, and navigation with Paraguay.
- February 8 – Wilson McCandless receives his commission for the District Court for the Western District of Pennsylvania.
- February 14 – Oregon is admitted as the thirty-third state.
- February 15 – The steam sloop USS Mohican is launched at Portsmouth Navy Yard and the screw sloop USS Narragansett is launched at the Boston Navy Yard.
- February 24 – Buchanan vetoes a bill that would give land grants to agricultural colleges.
- February 26 – The House upholds Buchanan's February 24 veto.

=== March 1859 ===
- March 3
  - The side-wheel steamer USS Saginaw, then called the USS Toucey, is launched at the Mare Island Navy Yard.
  - The 35th United States Congress adjourns from its second session.
- March 4 – The Republican Party controls both chambers of Congress following the previous year's elections.
- March 7 – The Supreme Court issues its decision in Ableman v. Booth. It rules that a state government cannot issue a writ of habeas corpus to challenge a federal arrest. The subject of the case was an escaped slave, Joshua Glover, and the decision was opposed by abolitionists.
- March 8 – Postmaster General Aaron V. Brown dies.
- March 9 – Matthew Deady receives his commission for the District Court for the District of Oregon.
- March 12 – The Southern Commercial Convention is held by pro-slavery advocates in Vicksburg, Mississippi. They discuss repealing the Act Prohibiting Importation of Slaves that took effect in 1808, which banned American participation in the Atlantic slave trade.
- March 14 – Joseph Holt becomes postmaster general, filling the vacancy left by Aaron V. Brown.
- March 23 – The sloop-of-war USS Dacotah is launched at the Norfolk Navy Yard.

=== April 1859 ===
- April 12 – The steam sloop USS Iroquois launches at the New York Navy Yard.
- April 15 – The United States signs a treaty with the Winnebago people.

=== June 1859 ===
- June 1 – The first major discovery of silver in the United States, the Comstock Lode, is discovered in present-day Virginia City, Nevada.
- June 25 – The screw sloop USS Seminole is launched at the Pensacola Navy Yard.

=== July 1859 ===
- July 5 – Kansas holds its fourth constitutional convention. A constitution is drafted to admit Kansas as a free state. Clarina I. H. Nichols serves as the only female delegate and gets three sections including in the constitution on women's rights.
- July 16 – The United States signs a treaty with the Chippewa of Swan Creek and Black River, and Munsee or Christian.
- July 29 – The Wyandotte Constitution is drafted at a Kansas constitutional convention.

=== August 1859 ===
- August 15 – The sloop-of-war USS Pensacola is launched at the Pensacola Navy Yard.

=== September 1859 ===
- September 29 – Buchanan appoints William Giles Jones to the district courts for the Northern, Middle, and Southern districts of Alabama as a recess appointment.

=== October 1859 ===
- October 1 – The United States signs a treaty with the Sauk and Fox people.
- October 4 – The Wyandotte Constitution is ratified in Kansas. The vote is 10,421 in favor and 5,530 opposed.
- October 5 – The United States signs a treaty with the Kansa people.
- October 16 – John Brown leads a group of abolitionists in an attack on Harpers Ferry, Virginia, to take control of the land and establish an abolitionist government. Brown's actions are polarizing in the United States; supporters of slavery call him treasonous and begin forming militias, while opponents of slavery consider him a martyr for the abolitionist cause.
- October 8 – The screw sloop USS Pawnee is launched at the Philadelphia Navy Yard.
- October 17 – John Brown's raiders take shelter in an engine house as they are attacked by the people of Harpers Ferry.
- October 18 – Lieutenant J. E. B. Stuart leads the capture of John Brown and his raiders on Buchanan's orders.
- October 25 – The United States and the United Kingdom begin a peaceful joint occupation of San Juan Island, which they both claim.
- October 31 – John Brown is found guilty of treason for his attack on Harpers Ferry.

=== December 1859 ===
- December 2 – John Brown is hanged for treason in Charles Town, Virginia.
- December 5 – The 36th United States Congress convenes for its first session.
- December 19 – Buchanan delivers the 1859 State of the Union Address. He warns the northern states against starting a war to abolish slavery and says he will not comment on John Brown's attack on Harpers Ferry. His neutral position and decision not to act has since come to be seen as a a major factor in the outbreak of the American Civil War.
- December 21 – The United States signs a postal convention with Belgium.

== 1860 ==
=== January 1860 ===
- January 18 – James Hughes receives his commission for the Court of Claims.
- January 26 – The steam sloop USS Richmond is launched at the Norfolk Navy Yard.
- January 30 – William Giles Jones receives his commission for the district courts for the Northern, Middle, and Southern districts of Alabama.

=== February 1860 ===
- February 27 – Abraham Lincoln delivers his anti-slavery Cooper Union speech in New York City as the start of a two-week speaking tour in New England.

=== March 1860 ===
- March 5 – The House forms a committee to investigate allegations that Buchanan was engaged in corruption.
- March 12 – William Davis Shipman receives his commission for the District Court for the District of Connecticut.
- March 21 – The United States signs an extradition treaty with Sweden and Norway.

=== April 1860 ===
- April 23 – The 1860 Democratic National Convention begins. Southern Democrats support a pro-slavery platform, but Northern Democrats support popular sovereignty for states to decide their own laws. Several state delegations walk out.

=== May 1860 ===
- May 3 – The Democratic National Convention ends without a presidential nominee for the Democratic Party after 57 ballots fail to reach a two-thirds majority.
- May 9 – The 1860 Constitutional Union Convention selects John Bell as the presidential nominee for the Constitutional Union Party with Edward Everett as his running mate. The party was created by former members of the Whig Party and the Know Nothings after their respective parties lost influence.
- May 18 – The 1860 Republican National Convention selects Abraham Lincoln as its presidential nominee with Hannibal Hamlin as his running mate.
- May 30 – The United States signs a treaty with the Delaware people.

=== June 1860 ===
- June – The House concludes its corruption investigation against Buchanan without filing any charges.
- June 16 – The Pacific Telegraph Act of 1860 authorizes a telegraph line between Missouri and San Francisco.
- June 18 – The Democratic Party holds a second national convention.
- June 21 – A position is created in the United States Army for an officer in charge of field signals. This will later become the United States Army Signal Corps.
- June 22 – Buchanan vetoes the Homestead Act of 1860.
- June 23
  - The second 1960 Democratic National Convention ends with Stephen Douglas as its presidential nominee and Herschel V. Johnson as his running mate.
  - Southern members of the Democratic Party hold their own Democratic National Convention.
  - The United States Government Printing Office is authorized.
  - The Federal Procurement Act of 1860 sets regulations for government purchases and contracts.
- June 25 – The 36th United States Congress adjourns from its first session.
- June 28 – Southern members of the Democratic Party's pro-slavery end Democratic National Convention with John C. Breckinridge as their presidential nominee and Joseph Lane as his running mate.
- June 30 – Supreme Court justice Peter V. Daniel dies, leaving a vacancy on the court.

=== August 1860 ===
- August 27 – The United States signs a treaty of amity, commerce, navigation, and extradition with Venezuela.

=== November 1860 ===
- November 6 – The 1860 United States elections are held. Abraham Lincoln wins the 1860 presidential election.
- November 10 – United States senator from South Carolina James Chesnut Jr. resigns in protest of Lincoln's election. South Carolina's other senator, James H. Hammond
- November 20 – Attorney General Jeremiah S. Black tells Buchanan that the federal government cannot wage war against a state but can take action if a state attempts to secede.

=== December 1860 ===
- December 3
  - The 36th United States Congress convenes for its second session.
  - Buchanan delivers the 1860 State of the Union Address. He opposes secession of the southern states, but he criticizes the northern states for their involvement in the political environment.
- December 5 – The Electoral College meets.
- December 8 – Secretary of the Treasury Howell Cobb resigns in support of Georgia.
- December 12 – Philip Francis Thomas becomes secretary of the treasury to fill the vacancy left by Howell Cobb.
- December 14 – Secretary of State Lewis Cass resigns after disagreeing with Buchanan on military presence in Charleston.
- December 17 – Jeremiah S. Black becomes secretary of state to fill the vacancy left by Lewis Cass.
- December 18 – John J. Crittenden proposes the Crittenden Compromise, which would amend the constitution to extend the Missouri Compromise to the west coast in exchange for southern states remaining in the United States. Abraham Lincoln opposes the compromise.
- December 20
  - South Carolina issues its Ordinance of Secession to secede from the United States. The measure is unanimously supported by 169 members of a secession convention.
  - Edwin Stanton succeeds Jeremiah S. Black as attorney general.
- December 24 – South Carolina governor Francis Wilkinson Pickens issues the South Carolina Declaration of Secession.
- December 26 – Buchanan orders Major Robert Anderson to relocate from Fort Moultrie to Fort Sumter.
- December 30 – Buchanan turns away commissioners from South Carolina who were requesting federal property.

== 1861 ==
=== January 1861 ===
- January 1 – John B. Floyd and Joseph Holt end their tenures as secretary of war and postmaster general, respectively.
- January 5 – South Carolinian forces fire at a ship carrying supplies to Fort Sumter.
- January 8 – Buchanan delivers his final message to Congress. He warns that the United States is facing a "calamity" and an "emergency", and he asks Congress to find a compromise.
- January 9 – Mississippi secedes from the United States.
- January 10 – Jacob Thompson, a citizen of Mississippi, ends his tenure as secretary of the interior. The position remains vacant for the remainder of Buchanan's presidency.
- January 11
  - Alabama secedes from the United States.
  - John Adams Dix succeeds Philip Francis Thomas as secretary of the treasury.
- January 18 – Joseph Holt becomes secretary of war, filling the vacancy left by John B. Floyd.
- January 19 – Georgia secedes from the United States.
- January 26 – Louisiana secedes from the United States.
- January 29 – Kansas is admitted as the thirty-fourth state. It adopts the Wyandotte Constitution and becomes a free state.
- January 31 – Buchanan nominates John Pettit to the District Court for the District of Kansas, but no vote is held.

=== February 1861 ===
- February 4 – The Confederate States of America is formed by the seceding states as an independent government. The Provisional Congress of the Confederate States convenes.
- February 5 – Buchanan nominates his secretary of state, Jeremiah Black, to the Supreme Court. No vote is held.
- February 7 – The Provisional Constitution of the Confederate States is adopted by the Confederacy.
- February 9
  - Jefferson Davis wins the 1861 Confederate States presidential election. Alexander H. Stephens is elected vice president.
  - The provisional legislature of the Confederate States determines that all United States laws that contradict the Confederate Constitution will be voided.
- February 12 – Horatio King becomes postmaster general, filling the vacancy left by Joseph Holt.
- February 13 – Congress counts the electoral votes to declare Abraham Lincoln the winner.
- February 18
  - Jefferson Davis is inaugurated as president of the Confederate States of America.
  - The United States signs a treaty with the Arapaho and Cheyenne peoples.
- February 21 – The Senate rejects Buchanan's nomination of Jeremiah Black.
- February 23 – Texas secedes from the United States.
- February 28 – The Colorado Territory is formed from territory of Kansas, Nebraska, New Mexico, and Utah.

=== March 1861 ===
- March 1
  - After being asked whether there is a plot to stop Lincoln from being inaugurated, Buchanan tells Congress that Washington, D.C. is safe because there are troops stationed there.
  - The Federal Procurement Act of 1861 sets regulations on government purchases and contracts.
- March 2
  - The Dakota Territory is split from the Nebraska Territory, and the Nevada Territory is split from the Utah Territory.
  - The Morrill Tariff is established with high tariff rates.
  - The Corwin Amendment is proposed as an amendment to the constitution that would forbid any attempts to constitutionally abolish slavery.
- March 3 – The 36th United States Congress adjourns from its second session.
- March 4 – Buchanan's term as president ends and Abraham Lincoln is inaugurated as the sixteenth president of the United States.

== See also ==
- Timeline of events leading to the American Civil War

== Works cited ==
- Bevans, Charles I. (1968). Treaties and Other International Agreements of the United States of America, 1776-1949. United States Department of State.
- Hall, Kermit L.; Ely, James W., eds. (2009). The Oxford Guide to United States Supreme Court Decisions (2nd ed.). Oxford University Press.
- Stathis, Stephen W. (2014). Landmark Legislation 1774–2012: Major U.S. Acts and Treaties (2nd ed.). CQ Press. ISBN 978-1-4522-9230-4.
