= Timeline of the Franklin Pierce presidency =

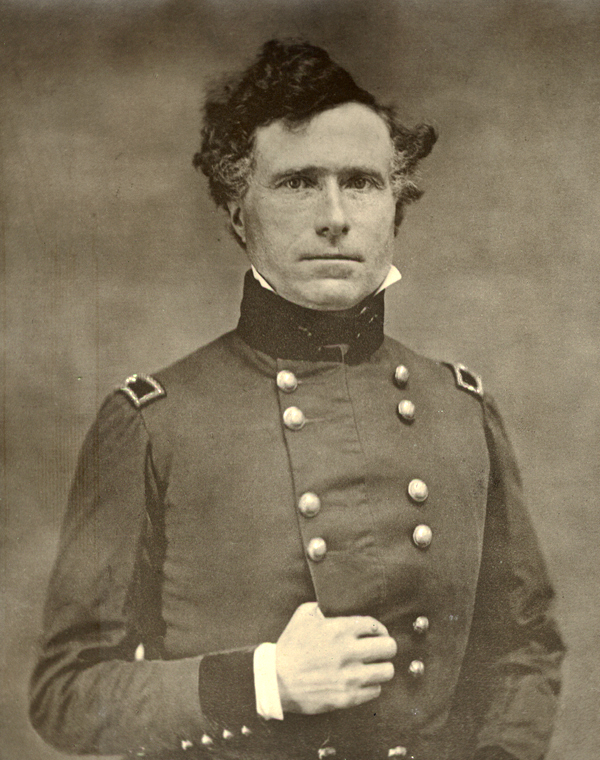
Franklin Pierce in 1852

The presidency of Franklin Pierce began on March 4, 1853, when Franklin Pierce was inaugurated as the fourteenth president of the United States and ended on March 4, 1857, after one term.

== 1853 ==
=== March 1853 ===
- March 4 – Franklin Pierce is inaugurated as the fourteenth president of the United States. He is the first president to say affirm instead of swear when reciting the oath of office. William R. King becomes vice president of the United States.
- March 7 – Pierce's cabinet is formed. William L. Marcy, James Guthrie, Jefferson Davis, Caleb Cushing, James Campbell, James C. Dobbin, and Robert McClelland become secretary of state, secretary of the treasury, secretary of war, attorney general, postmaster general, secretary of the navy, and secretary of the interior, respectively. All members of the cabinet stay in office for the entirety of Pierce's term.
- March 21 – Pierce nominates John Archibald Campbell to the Supreme Court of the United States.
- March 22 – John Archibald Campbell's nomination is confirmed and he receives his commission for the Supreme Court.
- March 26 – West Hughes Humphreys receives his commission for the district courts for the Eastern District, Middle District, and Western District of Tennessee.

=== April 1853 ===
- April 8 – Charles A. Ingersoll receives his commission for the District Court for the District of Connecticut.
- April 18 – Vice President William R. King dies the day he returns to the United States after working in Cuba.
- April 20 – Pierce issues an executive order scheduling a commemoration for William R. King.

=== July 1853 ===
- July 10
  - Pierce begins a tour of Maryland, Delaware, Pennsylvania, New York, and New Jersey.
  - The United States signs a navigation treaty with Argentina for access to the Paraná River and the Uruguay River.
- July 14 – The Exhibition of the Industry of All Nations, the first world's fair in the United States, is held at the New York Crystal Palace. Pierce is in attendance and gives the opening speech.
- July 18 – Pierce appoints William F. Giles to the District Court for the District of Maryland as a recess appointment.
- July 22 – Pierce's speaking tour ends.
- July 27
  - The United States signs a treaty of friendship, commerce, and navigation with Argentina.
  - The United States signs a treaty with the Comanche, Kiowa, and Apache peoples.

=== September 1853 ===
- September 6 – The United States signs an extradition treaty with the Free Hanseatic City of Bremen.
- September 10 – The United States signs a treaty with the Rogue River people.
- September 12 – The United States signs an extradition treaty with the Kingdom of Bavaria.
- September 19 – The United States signs a treaty with the Umpqua people (Cow Creek Band).

=== October 1853 ===
- October 13 – The United States signs an extradition treaty with the Kingdom of Württemberg.

=== November 1853 ===
- November 26 – The United States signs an extradition treaty with the Grand Duchy of Mecklenburg-Schwerin.

=== December 1853 ===
- December 2 – The United States signs an extradition treaty with the Grand Duchy of Mecklenburg-Schwerin.
- December 5
  - The 33rd United States Congress convenes for its first session.
  - Pierce delivers the 1853 State of the Union Address.
- December 30
  - The Gadsden Purchase is finalized. The United States purchases what will become the Southwestern United States from Mexico.
  - The United States signs an extradition treaty with the Grand Duchy of Oldenburg.

== 1854 ==
=== January 1854 ===
- January 11 – William F. Giles receives his commission for the District Court for the District of Maryland.
- January 18 – Pierce issues a proclamation warning American citizens not to invade Mexico.
- January 19 – Several members of Congress publish the Appeal of the Independent Democrats in opposition to the Kansas–Nebraska Act.
- January 23 – Isaac Stockton Keith Ogier receives his commission for the District Court for the Southern District of California.

=== March 1854 ===
- March 15 – The United States signs a treaty with the Oto and Missouri peoples.
- March 16 – The United States signs a treaty with the Omaha people.
- March 20 – The Republican Party is founded to oppose the Kansas–Nebraska Act and the addition of slave states. It is formed by a coalition of defectors from the Whig Party, the Free Soil Party, and the northern faction of the Democratic Party.
- March 31 – The United States signs the Convention of Kanagawa to open relations with Japan. This ends Japan's policy of isolating itself from international trade.

=== April 1854 ===
- April 25 – The Senate ratifies the Gadsden Purchase. It reduces the total area purchased.
- April 26 – Eli Thayer founds the Massachusetts Emigrant Aid Company. The organization seeks to move abolitionists to Kansas.

=== May 1854 ===
- May 3 – Pierce vetoes a bill that would provide land grants to benefit "indigent insane persons".
- May 6 – The United States signs a treaty with the Delaware people.
- May 10 – The United States signs a treaty with the Shawnee people.
- May 12 – The United States signs a treaty with the Menominee people.
- May 17 – The United States signs a treaty with the Iowa people.
- May 18 – The United States signs a treaty with the Sauk and Fox people and one with the Kickapoo people.
- May 30
  - The Kansas–Nebraska Act is passed, establishing the Kansas Territory and the Nebraska Territory. The law repeals the Missouri Compromise and allows both territories to decide whether they will become slave states or free states under the principle of popular sovereignty. This triggers the Bleeding Kansas conflict as supporters and opponents of slavery begin launching violent attacks against each other.
  - The United States signs a treaty with the Kaskaskia, Peoria, Piankeshaw, and Wea peoples.
- May 31 – Pierce issues a proclamation warning American citizens not to invade Cuba.

=== June 1854 ===
- June 2 – Escaped slave Anthony Burns is arrested in Boston. Violent protests will break out when the court orders his return.
- June 5
  - The Canadian–American Reciprocity Treaty expands trade between the Province of Canada and the United States.
  - The United States signs a treaty with the Miami people.
- June 6 – The newly-formed Republican Party convenes in Jackson, Michigan.
- June 7 – The United States signs an extradition treaty with the Schaumburg-Lippe.
- June 29 – Appropriations are provided to carry out the Gadsden Purchase.

=== July 1854 ===
- July 11 – The United States signs a treaty of commerce and navigation with the Ryukyu Kingdom.
- July 15 – The Senate ratifies the Treaty of Kanagawa with Japan.
- July 22 – The United States signs a convention regarding neutral ships at sea the Russian Empire.
- July 31 – The United States enters into a compact of commerce with the Kingdom of Lagos.

=== August 1854 ===
- August 4
  - The Graduation Act implements a graduated scale of price reductions for public land that had been up for sale for at least ten years.
  - Pierce vetoes appropriations for maintaining public works.
- August 7 – The 33rd United States Congress adjourns from its first session.
- August 21 – The United States signs a convention of inheritance with Duchy of Brunswick-Lüneburg.

=== September 1854 ===
- September 30 – The United States signs the 1854 Treaty of La Pointe with the Chippewa people.

=== October 1854 ===
- October 18 – American diplomat Pierre Soulé writes the Ostend Manifesto. It endorses an American invasion of Cuba if Spain does not sell the territory. Pierce had supported annexation, but his administration disavows the idea.

=== November 1854 ===
- November 4 – The United States signs a treaty with the Choctaw and Chickasaw peoples.
- November 15 – The United States signs a treaty with the Rogue River people.
- November 18 – The United States signs a treaty with the Chasta, Scoton, and Umpqua peoples.
- November 29 – The United States signs a treaty with the Umpqua and Kalapuya peoples.

=== December 1854 ===
- December 4
  - The 33rd United States Congress convenes for its second session.
  - Pierce delivers the 1854 State of the Union Address.
- December 9 – The United States signs a treaty with the Confederated Oto and Missouri people.
- December 26 – The United States signs the Treaty of Medicine Creek with numerous Indian tribes in the Washington Territory.

== 1855 ==
=== January 1855 ===
- January 13 – The United States signs a treaty with the Kingdom of the Two Sicilies regarding neutral ships at sea.
- January 18 – The United States signs an extradition treaty with the Kingdom of Hanover.
- January 22
  - The United States signs a treaty of consuls with the Netherlands.
  - The United States signs the Treaty with the Kalapuya, etc. with the Kalapuya and the Confederated Bands of the Willamette Valley, and the Treaty of Point Elliott with several Indian tribes in the Washington Territory.
- January 26 – The United States signs a treaty with several Indian tribes in the Washington Territory.
- January 31 – The United States signs the Treaty of Washington with the Wyandot people and the Treaty of Neah Bay with the Makah people.

=== February 1855 ===
- February 3 – The frigate USS Sabine is launched at the New York Navy Yard. Construction had originally begun in 1822.
- February 10 – The Naturalization Act of 1855 permits citizenship for anyone who marries or is born to man with American citizenship.
- February 16 – The frigate USS Santee is launched at the Portsmouth Navy Yard. Construction had originally begun in 1820.
- February 17 – Pierce vetoes a bill that would allow American citizens to sue the French government.
- February 20 – Hiram V. Willson receives his commission for the District Court for the Northern District of Ohio.
- February 22 – The United States signs the Treaty of Washington with the Chippewa people.
- February 23 – The steam frigate USS Niagara is launched at the New York Navy Yard.
- February 24 – The Court of Claims is established.
- February 27 – The United States signs the Treaty of Washington with the Winnebago people.

=== March 1855 ===
- March 3
  - Pierce vetoes funding for steamships to deliver mail across the ocean.
  - Pierce nominates Isaac Blackford and John Gilchrist to the Court of Claims, and they are confirmed the same day. He also nominates Joseph Henry Lumpkin, but Lumpkin declines. Matthew Hall McAllister and Samuel H. Treat receive their commissions for the Circuit Court for the Districts of California and the District Court for the Southern District of Illinois, respectively.
  - The 33rd United States Congress adjourns from its second session.
- March 26 – The United States signs a treaty with the Hawaiian Kingdom regarding neutral ships at sea.

=== May 1855 ===
- May 8 – Pierce appoints George Parker Scarburgh to the Court of Claims as a recess appointment.

=== June 1855 ===
- June 4 – The screw steamer USS Arctic is launched at the Philadelphia Navy Yard.
- June 5 – The Native American Party of the Know Nothings becomes the American Party.
- June 9
  - The United States signs a treaty with Nicaragua regarding neutral ships at sea.
  - The United States signs the Treaties of Walla Walla with several Indian tribes.
- June 11 – The United States signs a treaty with the Nez Perce people.
- June 15 – The screw frigate USS Merrimack is launched at the Boston Navy Yard.
- June 22 – The United States signs the Treaty of Washington with the Choctaw and Chickasaw peoples.
- June 25 – The United States signs a treaty with the Walla Walla and Wasco peoples.

=== July 1855 ===
- July 1 – The United States signs a treaty with the Quinault and Quileute peoples.
- July 2 – A pro-slavery Kansas government convenes in Pawnee, Kansas.
- July 16 – The United States signs the Hellgate Treaty with the Flathead, Kutenai, and Upper Pend d'Oreilles peoples.
- July 28 – The sloop-of-war USS Constellation is commissioned.
- July 31 – The United States signs a treaty with the Ottawa and Chippewa peoples.

=== August 1855 ===
- August 2 – The United States signs a treaty with the Chippewa people of Sault Ste. Marie and a treaty with the Chippewa people of Saginaw, Swan Creek, and Black River.

=== September 1855 ===
- September 5 – An anti-slavery Kansas government led by Free Staters convenes in Big Springs, Kansas.

=== October 1855 ===
- October 1 – The United States signs a treaty of amity, commerce, and navigation with the Kingdom of the Two Sicilies.
- October 5 – Pierce appoints James M. Love to the District Court for the District of Iowa as a recess appointment. He appoints George W. Hopkins to the Circuit Court of the District of Columbia, but Hopkins declines.
- October 17 – The United States signs a treaty with the Blackfeet, Flathead, and Nez Perce peoples.
- October 23 – The Topeka Constitutional Convention convenes to draft the anti-slavery Topeka Constitution in Kansas.
- October 24 – The screw frigate USS Wabash is launched at the Philadelphia Navy Yard.

=== November 1855 ===
- November 26 – The Wakarusa War begins as pro-slavery border ruffians attack Free Staters in Lawrence, Kansas.
- November 27 – Pierce appoints James Dunlop, a judge on the Circuit Court of the District of Columbia, as the court's chief judge.

=== December 1855 ===
- December 1 – The steam frigate USS Minnesota is launched at the Washington Navy Yard.
- December 3 – The 34th United States Congress convenes for its first session.
- December 7 – James Dunlop receives his commission as chief judge of the Circuit Court of the District of Columbia.
- December 8 – Pierce issues a proclamation warning American citizens against participating in military activity in Nicaragua.
- December 13 – The screw frigate USS Roanoke is launched at the Norfolk Navy Yard.
- December 14 – William Matthews Merrick receives his commission for the Circuit Court of the District of Columbia.
- December 21 – The United States signs a treaty with the Molala people.
- December 31 – Pierce delivers the 1855 State of the Union Address.

== 1856 ==
=== January 1856 ===
- January 24 – Pierce delivers a message to Congress about the conflict in Kansas and encourages statehood.

=== February 1856 ===
- February 5 – The United States signs a treaty with the Stockbridge and Munsee people.
- February 8 – The Supreme Court issues its decision in Dodge v. Woolsey. It rules that the state of Ohio could not raise taxes on banks when it had guaranteed lower rates under its previous constitution.
- February 11
  - Pierce issues a proclamation ordering violent organizations in Kansas to stand down.
  - George Parker Scarburgh receives his commission for the Court of Claims.
  - The United States signs a treaty with the Menominee people.
- February 19 – The Supreme Court issues its decision in Murray's Lessee v. Hoboken Land & Improvement Co.. It rules that the federal government can recover embezzled federal funds through executive action without violating due process. This is the first Supreme Court case to consider the Due Process Clause.

=== March 1856 ===
- March 11 – McQueen McIntosh receives his commission for the District Court for the Northern District of Florida.

=== April 1856 ===
- April 6 – Slaves Dred Scott and Harriet Robinson Scott file lawsuits for their freedom in the Circuit Court of St. Louis County. Over the following year, this will escalate into the Supreme Court case Dred Scott v. Sandford.

=== May 1856 ===
- May 12 – Andrew Gordon Magrath receives his commission for the District Court for the District of South Carolina.
- May 19
  - Anti-slavery senator Charles Sumner delivers his Crime Against Kansas speech to argue in favor of admitting Kansas as a free state. The speech is heavily critical of pro-slavery senators Stephen A. Douglas and Andrew Butler.
  - Pierce vetoes appropriations for internal improvements. He says that the Constitution does not grant the power of internal improvements to the federal government.
- May 21 – Pro-slavery border ruffians attack anti-slavery Free Staters in Lawrence, Kansas, after Judge Samuel Dexter Lecompte says that Free Staters are treasonous.
- May 22 – Pro-slavery representative Preston Brooks responds to Charles Sumner's Crime Against Kansas speech by severely beating Sumner with a cane on the Senate floor. Brooks will resign from Congress, while Sumner will spend the next three years recovering from his injuries.
- May 24 – John Brown leads a group in the killing of five pro-slavery citizens as a response to the attack on Lawrence, Kansas.
- May 29 – The United States signs a treaty of amity and commerce with the Kingdom of Siam.

=== June 1856 ===
- June 2
  - The 1856 Democratic National Convention selects James Buchanan as the presidential nominee for the Democratic Party with John C. Breckinridge as his running mate. This is the first time an incumbent president sought his party's nomination and was denied.
  - The 1856 American National Convention selects former president Millard Fillmore as the presidential nominee for the American Party with Andrew Jackson Donelson as his running mate. Anti-slavery delegates walk out to protest the suggestion of a pro-slavery platform.
- June 17 – The 1856 Republican National Convention selects John C. Frémont as the presidential nominee for the Republican Party with William L. Dayton as his running mate.
- June 19 – The screw frigate USS Colorado is launched at the Norfolk Navy Yard.

=== July 1856 ===
- July 3 – The United States signs an extradition treaty with the Austrian Empire.
- July 8 – Congress overrides Pierce's May 19 vetoes of appropriations for internal improvements.
- July 22 – The United States signs a treaty with Peru regarding neutral ships at sea.

=== August 1856 ===
- August 7 – The United States signs a treaty with the Creek and Seminole peoples.
- August 14 – Pierce vetoes an infrastructure bill for the Patapsco River and the Port of Baltimore. The veto will be overridden.
- August 16 – Congress raises its own annual salary from $1,500 to $3,000, and sets rules for reductions in pay if members of Congress are absent.
- August 18
  - The Guano Islands Act allows all American citizens to claim islands with guano supplies on behalf of the United States if they intended to mine the guano.
  - The 34th United States Congress adjourns from its first session.
- August 21 – The 34th United States Congress convenes for its second session.
- August 24 – Pro-slavery militants from Missouri launch a three-day attack on John Brown and his supporters.
- August 30
  - The Battle of Osawatomie takes place in Osawatomie, Kansas, when 250 pro-slavery border ruffians led by John William Reid fight 40 Free Staters led by John Brown. Reid's forces win the battle and destroy Osawatomie.
  - The 34th United States Congress adjourns from its second session.

=== September 1856 ===
- September 17 – The 1856 Whig National Convention selects the America Party's ticket of Millard Fillmore and Andrew Jackson Donelson as the nominees for the Whig Party. This is the final Whig National Convention before the party's collapse.

=== November 1856 ===
- November 4 – The 1856 United States elections are held. James Buchanan of the Democratic Party wins the 1856 presidential election.

=== December 1856 ===
- December 1 – The 34th United States Congress convenes for its third session.
- December 2 – Pierce delivers the 1856 State of the Union Address.
- December 13 – The United States signs a treaty of friendship and commerce with Qajar Iran.

== 1857 ==
=== January 1857 ===
- January 15 – Opponents of slavery hold the State Disunion Convention in Worcester, Massachusetts, to consider separating the Northern United States an the Southern United States into two distinct nations.

=== February 1857 ===
- February 3 – David Allen Smalley receives his commission for the District Court for the District of Vermont.
- February 21 – The Coinage Act of 1857 revokes the status of foreign coins as legal tender in the United States.
- February 26 – The Minnesota Territory is authorized to form a state government.

=== March 1857 ===
- March 3
  - The Tariff Act of 1857 reduces tariffs on imports.
  - The Atlantic Cable Act of 1857 authorizes the secretary of state to oversee the laying of underwater telegraph lines between Newfoundland and Ireland.
  - The Overland California Mail Act of 1857 authorizes the postmaster general to hire a contractor for establishing a mail route from the Mississippi River to San Francisco.
  - Thomas Howard DuVal and Samuel Treat receive their commissions for the district courts for the Western District of Texas and the Eastern District of Missouri, respectively.
  - The 34th United States Congress adjourns from its third session.
- March 4 – Pierce's term ends and James Buchanan is inaugurated as the fifteenth president of the United States.

== Works cited ==
- Bevans, Charles I. (1968). Treaties and Other International Agreements of the United States of America, 1776-1949. United States Department of State.
- Hall, Kermit L.; Ely, James W., eds. (2009). The Oxford Guide to United States Supreme Court Decisions (2nd ed.). Oxford University Press.
- Stathis, Stephen W. (2014). Landmark Legislation 1774–2012: Major U.S. Acts and Treaties (2nd ed.). CQ Press. ISBN 978-1-4522-9230-4.
