= Timeline of the Abraham Lincoln presidency =

The presidency of Abraham Lincoln began on March 4, 1861, when Abraham Lincoln was inaugurated as the sixteenth president of the United States and ended with his assassination on April 15, 1865, shortly after his second term began. The American Civil War began in the second month of Lincoln's presidency and ended days before his death.

== 1861 ==
=== March 1861 ===
- March 4 – Abraham Lincoln is inaugurated as the sixteenth president of the United States. In his speech, he says that states cannot secede and that he believes the states are "not enemies, but friends". Hannibal Hamlin becomes vice president of the United States.
- March 5 – William H. Seward, Salmon P. Chase, Simon Cameron, Edward Bates, Montgomery Blair, Gideon Welles, and Caleb B. Smith become secretary of state, secretary of the treasury, secretary of war, attorney general, postmaster general, secretary of the navy, and secretary of the interior, respectively. Seward and Welles will serve for the entirety of Lincoln's presidency.
- March 6 – The United States signs a treaty with the Sauk and Fox people.
- March 11 – The Confederate States of America adopts the Constitution of the Confederate States.
- March 14 – The Supreme Court issues its decision in Kentucky v. Dennison. It rules that the court cannot force a state to comply with the Extradition Clause of the Constitution. The decision will be overturned in 1987 with Puerto Rico v. Branstad.

=== April 1861 ===
- April 1 – The Morrill Tariff takes effect.
- April 9 – President Jefferson Davis of the Confederate States orders General P. G. T. Beauregard to fire at United States (Union) forces at Fort Sumter in Charleston Harbor, South Carolina, if they do not surrender the fort.
- April 12 – The American Civil War begins with the Battle of Fort Sumter when Confederate forces fire upon Fort Sumter.
- April 13 – The Confederacy wins the Battle of Fort Sumter when Major Robert Anderson surrenders.
- April 15 – Lincoln calls for 75,000 people to volunteer for the United States Army. He calls for a special session of Congress on July 4.
- April 17 – Virginia secedes from the United States and joins the Confederacy.
- April 19 – Lincoln orders that the ports of the Confederacy be blockaded.
- April 20 – Robert E. Lee leaves the United States Army to join the Confederacy.
- April 27 – Lincoln expands his blockade of Confederate ports.

=== May 1861 ===
- May 3 – Lincoln orders an expansion of the military.
- May 6 – Arkansas secedes from the United States and joins the Confederacy.
- May 10 – The Morrill Tariff is passed, increasing duties to fund the war effort.
- May 20 – North Carolina secedes from the United States and joins the Confederacy.
- May 21 – The Confederacy relocates its capital from Montgomery, Alabama, to Richmond, Virginia.
- May 24 – Arlington House, the home of Confederate General Robert E. Lee, is captured by the Union army.

=== June 1861 ===
- June 8 – Tennessee secedes from the United States and joins the Confederacy.
- June 20 – Several counties split from western Virginia to form West Virginia and stay in the Union.

=== July 1861 ===
- July 2 – The United States signs a treaty with the Delaware people.
- July 4
  - The 37th United States Congress convenes for its first session.
  - Lincoln addresses Congress to call for a larger army.
- July 11 – The United States signs a treaty of friendship, commerce, and navigation with Denmark.
- July 17 – The Fiscal Year 1862 appropriations expands the army and the navy.
- July 21 – The First Battle of Bull Run takes place near Manassas, Virginia. Confederate forces led by General Thomas J. Jackson defeat Union forces led by General Irvin McDowell. Jackson comes to be known as Stonewall Jackson for his actions in this battle.
- July 25 – The United States offers a bonus of $100 for anyone who serves two years in the Union Army.
- July 29 – The president is authorized to use the military to suppress rebellion.

=== August 1861 ===
- August 5 – The Revenue Act implements a three-percent income tax.
- August 6
  - Lincoln's emergency use of the military is authorized by Congress.
  - The Confiscation Act of 1861 authorizes the government to seize property used by the Confederacy. This is used as legal justification to provide refuge for escaped slaves.
  - The 37th United States Congress adjourns from its first session.
- August 16 – Lincoln issues a proclamation banning trade with the Confederacy.

=== September 1861 ===
- September 14 – The USS Colorado attacks the steamer Judah at Pensacola, Florida, in the first naval battle of the Civil War.

=== October 1861 ===
- October 24 – The president of Overland Telegraph Company sends Lincoln a telegram from Sacramento, California, the first to be sent across the continent.
- October 31 – General Winfield Scott retires as Commanding General of the United States Army.

=== November 1861 ===
- November 1 – Lincoln appoints George B. McClellan as Commanding General of the United States Army.
- November 6 – The United States signs a treaty abolishing stade or brunshausen dues with Kingdom of Hanover.
- November 15 – The United States signs a treaty with the Potawatomi people.

=== December 1861 ===
- December 2 – The 37th United States Congress convenes for its second session.
- December 3 – Lincoln delivers the 1861 State of the Union Address. He expresses support for freeing slaves.
- December 11 – The United States signs an extradition treaty and a postal convention with Mexico.

== 1862 ==
=== January 1862 ===
- January 15 – Edwin Stanton succeeds Simon Cameron as secretary of war.
- January 21 – Lincoln nominates Noah Haynes Swayne to the Supreme Court to fill a vacancy left by John McLean.
- January 24 – The Senate confirms Lincoln's nomination of Noah Haynes Swayne to the Supreme Court.
- January 27 – Lincoln orders "general movement" against the Confederacy on February 22.

=== February 1862 ===
- February 14 – Lincoln issues an executive order to release people charged with treason if they swear they will not assist the Confederacy.
- February 20 – Lincoln's eleven-year-old son William Wallace Lincoln dies. He is the second of Lincoln's sons to die.
- February 25
  - The Legal Tender Act of 1862 authorizes the distribution of United States Notes as federal currency.
  - The United States signs a treaty of commerce and navigation with the Ottoman Empire.

=== March 1862 ===
- March 6 – Lincoln proposes emancipating slaves with compensation.
- March 9 – The Battle of Hampton Roads between the Union USS Monitor and the Confederate USS Merrimack ends in a draw. This is the first ever battle between two ironclad warships.
- March 13
  - A law is passed forbidding the military from returning escaped slaves.
  - The United States signs a treaty with the Kansa people.

=== April 1862 ===
- April 7
  - The Battle of Shiloh ends with a victory for Union General Ulysses S. Grant.
  - The United States signs a treaty to suppress the Atlantic slave trade with the United Kingdom.
- April 16 – Slavery in Washington, D.C. is abolished. Slaveowners are offered $300 in compensation if they swear an oath of allegiance.

=== May 1862 ===
- May 12 – Lincoln issues a proclamation ending blockades of Confederate ports.
- May 20 – The Homestead Act of 1862 allows settlers to claim up to 160 acres of public land.
- May 25 – Lincoln issues an executive order seizing railroads and placing them under military control.

=== June 1862 ===
- June 1 – General Robert E. Lee is appointed commander of the Confederate Army of Northern Virginia.
- June 19 – Slavery is abolished in the federal territories.
- June 24 – The United States signs a treaty with the Ottawa people of Blanchard's Fork and Roche de Boeuf.
- June 26 – Lincoln issues an executive order creating the Army of Virginia as a Union counterpart to the Confederate's army of Virginia.
- June 28 – The United States signs a treaty with the Kickapoo people.

=== July 1862 ===
- July 1
  - The Union Pacific Railway Company is created under federal law. The same law authorizes the construction of railways and telegraph lines between the Missouri River and the West Coast.
  - Union Major David Hunter includes black soldiers among his forces.
- July 2
  - The Morrill Act establishes land grants for universities .
  - A federal oath of office is created. It requires officials to swear that they have never "borne arms against the United States" or assisted those who had.
- July 4 – Lincoln makes another proposal for compensated emancipation.
- July 14 – Military pensions are granted to anyone who has served in the military since March 4, 1861, and pension rates are increased. This becomes the most expensive government activity of the era.
- July 17
  - The Confiscation Act of 1862 frees slaves of people engaging in rebellion and authorizes the seizure of private property of Confederate leadership.
  - Freedom is granted for any slaves who are serving in a militia, alongside freedom for their mothers, wives, and children.
  - The 37th United States Congress adjourns from its second session.
- July 19 – The United States signs an agreement with Denmark regarding colonization of the West Indies.
- July 22 – Lincoln privately informs his cabinet that he intends to emancipate slaves. They encourage him to wait until a major Union victory so it does not seem like an act of desperation for global support.

=== August 1862 ===
- August 17 – The Dakota War of 1862 begins when Dakota people launch an attack against white settlers in Minnesota.
- August 24 – Lincoln publishes an open letter to Horace Greeley in The New York Times saying he intends to save the Union whether it means freeing no slaves, some slaves, or all slaves.
- August 31 – The Second Battle of Bull Run ends. Confederate General Stonewall Jackson defeats Union General John Pope.

=== September 1862 ===
- September 17 – Union General George B. McClellan causes Confederate General Robert E. Lee to retreat in the Battle of Antietam. With almost 5,000 men killed, this is the deadliest day in the American Civil War.
- September 22 – Lincoln issues the Emancipation Proclamation, declaring that all slaves in Confederate states are free effective January 1 if the Confederacy does not surrender.

=== October 1862 ===
- October 21 – The United States signs a treaty of commerce and navigation with Liberia.

=== November 1862 ===
- November – The Republican Party retains both chambers of Congress in the 1862 United States elections.

=== December 1862 ===
- December 1
  - The 37th United States Congress convenes for its third session.
  - Lincoln delivers the 1862 State of the Union Address. He proposes a colony for freed slaves, advocates a constitutional amendment for compensated emancipation of slavery, and accuses Indian tribes of "a spirit of insubordination" following violent conflict.
- December 11 – Lincoln announces that he has commuted all death penalties associated with the Dakota War for people who participated in battles instead of massacres.
- December 13 – Confederate General Robert E. Lee defeats Union General Ambrose Burnside in the Battle of Fredericksburg.
- December 31
  - The USS Monitor sinks.
  - West Virginia is authorized to become a state if supported by the people of the region.

== 1863 ==
=== January 1863 ===
- January 1
  - The Union government recognizes all slaves in Confederate-claimed territory as free, as declared in the Emancipation Proclamation. This occurs as a wartime measure, and whether it would apply in peacetime remains unclear.
  - Caleb B. Smith's tenure as secretary of the interior ends.
- January 2 – The Battle of Stones River takes place.
- January 8 – John Palmer Usher becomes secretary of the interior, filling the vacancy left by Caleb B. Smith.

=== February 1863 ===
- February 17 – The United States signs a second treaty to suppress the Atlantic slave trade with the United Kingdom.
- February 24 – The Arizona Territory is split from the New Mexico Territory.
- February 25 – The National Bank Act creates a federal banking system. It includes a national currency and the position of Comptroller of the Currency.

=== March 1863 ===
- March 3
  - The Idaho Territory is established.
  - The Habeas Corpus Suspension Act authorizes the president to suspend writs of habeas corpus at his discretion until the Confederacy is defeated.
  - The Enrollment Act establishes conscription for service in the Union army. Conscripts are permitted to hire substitutes.
  - The Legal Tender Act of 1863 expands the federal government's ability to issue debt and non-interest bearing notes.
  - The National Academy of Sciences is established.
  - The 37th United States Congress adjourns from its third session.
- March 6 – Lincoln nominates Stephen Johnson Field to a new seat on the Supreme Court.
- March 10
  - The Senate confirms Lincoln's nomination of Stephen Johnson Field to the Supreme Court.
  - The Supreme Court issues its decisions in the Prize Cases. It rules that Lincoln had the constitutional authority to blockade Confederate ports and seize their property because the Confederacy was both an insurrection and a government at war.
- March 11 – The United States signs a treaty with the Chippewa people.

=== April 1863 ===
- April 20 – Lincoln issues a proclamation to admit West Virginia as a state, effective June 20.

=== May 1863 ===
- May 1 – Confederate General Robert E. Lee defeats Union General Joseph Hooker in the Battle of Chancellorsville.
- May 2 – Confederate General Stonewall Jackson is struck by friendly fire and loses his left arm.
- May 3 – The Idaho Territory is created using the land from other United States territories.
- May 10 – Confederate General Stonewall Jackson dies of pneumonia.
- May 19 – The Siege of Vicksburg begins when Union General Ulysses S. Grant launches an attack against Vicksburg, Mississippi.
- May 20 – The United States signs a treaty of commerce and navigation with Belgium.
- May 23 – The Bureau of Colored Troops is established.

=== June 1863 ===
- June 9 – The United States signs a treaty with the Nez Perce people.
- June 20 – West Virginia becomes the thirty-fifth state.

=== July 1863 ===
- July 1
  - The first day of the Battle of Gettysburg, the largest battle of the Civil War, takes place in Gettysburg, Pennsylvania, between Union General George Meade and Confederate General Robert E. Lee.
  - William P. Fessenden succeeds Salmon P. Chase as secretary of the treasury.
- July 2
  - The Battle of Gettysburg continues into its second day.
  - The United States signs a treaty with the Eastern Shoshone people.
- July 3 – The Battle of Gettysburg ends in a Union victory.
- July 4 – The Siege of Vicksburg ends with a victory for Union General Ulysses S. Grant.
- July 5 – Lee's forces retreat from Gettysburg.
- July 13 – Riots break out in New York City to protest conscription. They become race riots against black Americans.
- July 16
  - Lincoln nominates Samuel Freeman Miller to the Supreme Court to fill a vacancy left by Peter V. Daniel. The Senate confirms his nomination the same day.
  - The New York City draft riots are dispersed.
- July 20 – The United States signs a treaty with Belgium to abolish the paying of dues when navigating the Scheldt.
- July 30
  - Lincoln issues the Order of Retaliation, mandating that if the Confederacy executes prisoners, then the Union will execute the same number of prisoners.
  - The United States signs a treaty with the Northwestern Shoshone people.

=== September 1863 ===
- September 15 – Lincoln issues a proclamation nationally suspending habeas corpus.

=== October 1863 ===
- October 1 – The United States signs a treaty with the Western Shoshone people.
- October 2 – The United States signs a treaty with the Chippewa people.
- October 7 – The United States signs a treaty with the Ute people.
- October 12 – The United States signs a treaty with the Shoshoni-Goship people.
- October 17
  - Lincoln appoints David Davis to the Supreme Court as a recess appointment to fill the vacancy left by John Archibald Campbell.
  - Lincoln issues a proclamation requesting 300,000 volunteers to join the military.

=== November 1863 ===
- November 19 – Lincoln delivers the Gettysburg Address. He declares the emancipation of slaves to be a central goal of the war alongside preservation of the Union.

=== December 1863 ===
- December 1 – Lincoln nominates his Supreme Court recess appointment David Davis for Senate approval.
- December 7 – The 38th United States Congress convenes for its first session.
- December 8
  - Lincoln delivers the 1863 State of the Union Address.
  - Lincoln offers a pardon to any Confederate who takes an oath to the United States.
  - The Senate confirms Lincoln's nomination of David Davis to the Supreme Court.

== 1864 ==
=== January 1864 ===
- January 11 – The Supreme Court issues its decision in Gelpcke v. Dubuque. It rules that the Iowa Supreme Court was incorrect to validate local bonds that violated the Constitution of Iowa.
- January 28 – The United States signs a treaty with Japan to reduce duties on imports.

=== February 1864 ===
- February 24 – The president is authorized to establish quotas for the military and to use conscription to meet them.

=== March 1864 ===
- March 10 – Lincoln appoints General Ulysses S. Grant as commander of the armies.
- March 21 – Nevada Territory is authorized to form a state government.
- March 26 – Lincoln issues a proclamation declaring that captured Confederates are not eligible for amnesty.

=== April 1864 ===
- April 8 – The Senate adopts the Thirteenth Amendment to the United States Constitution, which will abolish slavery when it is ratified.
- April 12 – The United States signs a treaty with the Chippewa people.
- April 18 – Lincoln gives a speech at a Sanitary Fair in Baltimore.

=== May 1864 ===
- May 7 – The United States signs a treaty with the Chippewa people.
- May 18 – Lincoln issues an executive order authorizing the arrest of journalists and publishers who harm the war effort.
- May 26 – The Montana Territory is established.

=== June 1864 ===
- June 7 – The 1864 National Union National Convention nominates Lincoln as the National Union Party's presidential candidate, with Andrew Johnson as his running mate.
- June 16 – Lincoln gives a speech at a Sanitary Fair in Philadelphia.
- June 27 – Lincoln accepts the National Union Party's presidential nomination.
- June 28 – The Fugitive Slave Act of 1850 is repealed.

=== July 1864 ===
- July 4
  - Lincoln pocket vetoes the Wade–Davis Bill that would regulate readmission of southern states. He considers the bill's requirements too high.
  - The United States signs a treaty of friendship, commerce, and navigation with Honduras.
  - The 38th United States Congress adjourns from its first session.
- July 5 – Lincoln issues a proclamation declaring martial law in Kentucky.
- July 18 – Lincoln orders that 500,000 people join the military, through conscription if necessary.

=== August 1864 ===
- August 24 – The United States signs the First Geneva Convention.
- August 29 – The 1864 Democratic National Convention nominates former commander George B. McClellan as its presidential candidate, with George H. Pendleton as his running mate.

=== September 1864 ===
- September 1 – Confederate General John Hood and his forces flee from Atlanta, Georgia.
- September 2 – Union General William Tecumseh Sherman occupies Atlanta, Georgia.
- September 3 – Lincoln issues an executive order honoring William Tecumseh Sherman.
- September 24 – William Dennison Jr. succeeds Montgomery Blair as postmaster general.

=== October 1864 ===
- October 14 – The United States signs a treaty with the Klamath, Modoc, and Yahooskin peoples.
- October 18 – The United States signs a treaty with the Chippewa people.
- October 22 – The United States signs the Shimonoseki Convention with France, the Netherlands, and the United Kingdom to demand compensation from Japan.
- October 31 – Nevada becomes the thirty-sixth state.

=== November 1864 ===
- November – The 1864 United States elections take place. Lincoln wins the presidential election, and the Republican Party holds supermajorities in both chambers of Congress.
- November 3 – The United States signs a treaty of amity, commerce, navigation, and extradition with Haiti.
- November 16 – Sherman's March to the Sea begins when Union General William Tecumseh Sherman burns Atlanta and leads his forces on a fifty-mile trek to Savannah, Georgia, destroying the countryside as they pass.

=== December 1864 ===
- December 2 – James Speed succeeds Edward Bates as attorney general.
- December 5 – The 38th United States Congress convenes for its second session.
- December 6
  - Lincoln nominates Salmon P. Chase as Chief Justice of the United States. The Senate confirms his nomination the same day.
  - Lincoln delivers the 1864 State of the Union Address.
- December 19 – Lincoln issues a proclamation calling for an additional 300,000 men to join the military.

== 1865 ==
=== January 1865 ===
- January 31 – The House of Representatives adopts the Thirteenth Amendment, which will abolish slavery when it is ratified.

=== February 1865 ===
- February 1 – Lincoln sends the Thirteenth Amendment to the states for ratification.
- February 3 – The Hampton Roads Conference is held to negotiate peace between the Union and the Confederacy. Lincoln, Secretary of State William H. Seward, and two Confederate cabinet members are present.
- February 6 – The Confederate Congress transfers the powers of commander-in-chief from President Jefferson Davis to General Robert E. Lee.
- February 10 – Lincoln submits peace proposals to the House.

=== March 1865 ===
- March 3 – The Freedmen's Bureau is established to provide aid and settlement to freed slaves.
- March 4
  - Lincoln is inaugurated for his second term. Andrew Johnson becomes vice president.
  - The 38th United States Congress adjourns from its second session.
- March 6 – The United States signs a treaty with the Omaha people.
- March 7 – Hugh McCulloch becomes secretary of the treasury after William P. Fessenden is not retained for Lincoln's second term.
- March 8 – The United States signs a treaty with the Winnebago people.
- March 10 – The United States signs a treaty with the Ponca people.
- March 11 – Lincoln issues a proclamation offering pardons to military deserters.
- March 13 – The Confederate army begins recruiting slaves as soldiers, offering them freedom.
- March 14 – Lincoln issues an executive order declaring that anyone trading with the Confederacy by sea will be arrested as a prisoner of war.
- March 17 – Lincoln issues a proclamation declaring that people providing weapons to Indians fighting the United States will be arrested.
- March 27 – Lincoln issues an executive order that the American flag is to be raised at Fort Sumter, where the Civil War began.

=== April 1865 ===
- April 3 – The Union army seizes control of Confederate capital Richmond, Virginia, and of Petersburg, Virginia.
- April 4 – Lincoln visits Richmond following its capture.
- April 9 – The Civil War ends when Robert E. Lee surrenders to Ulysses S. Grant.
- April 11 – Lincoln speaks to the public on the White House lawn. This is his final public address.
- April 12 – Robert E. Lee's surrender takes effect.
- April 14 – Actor John Wilkes Booth enters the presidential box at Ford's Theatre in Washington, D.C. and shoots Lincoln in the back of the head. Co-conspirators had simultaneously planned assassinations for vice President Andrew Johnson, Secretary of State William H. Seward, and General Ulysses S. Grant, but none were successful.
- April 15 – Lincoln dies approximately nine hours after being shot. Andrew Johnson becomes president of the United States.

== See also ==
- List of American Civil War battles
- Timeline of events leading to the American Civil War

== Works cited ==
- Bevans, Charles I. (1968). Treaties and Other International Agreements of the United States of America, 1776-1949. United States Department of State.
- Hall, Kermit L.; Ely, James W., eds. (2009). The Oxford Guide to United States Supreme Court Decisions (2nd ed.). Oxford University Press.
