= Henry Wikoff =

American lawyer

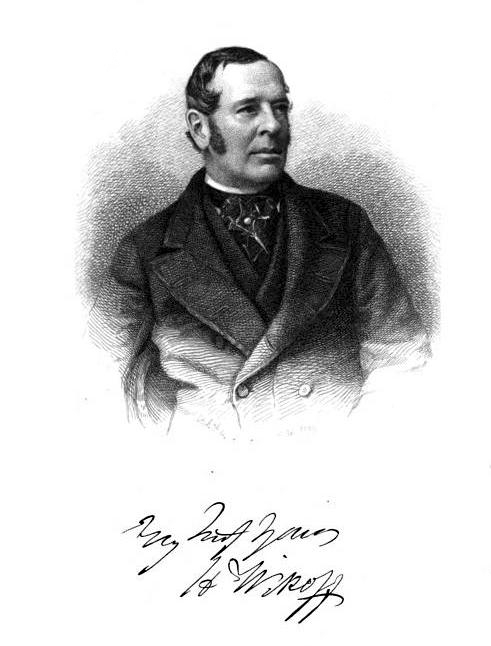
Henry Wikoff

Henry Wikoff (c. 1812 – 28 April 1884), known as the Chevalier Wikoff, was an American traveler, writer, impresario and diplomat.

== Biography ==
Wikoff was born in Philadelphia, the illegitimate son of a doctor who owned Blockley Township, Pennsylvania. Despite his birth status, he inherited a sizable fortune, which enabled him to travel extensively in Europe. He graduated from Union College in 1831, and then attended the College of New Jersey (but did not get a degree). He was admitted to the bar in Pennsylvania in 1834.

That same year, Wikoff then went to Europe, where he acted as a diplomatic agent for the United States, Britain, and France at different times, and even spent some time in prison in Italy. Upon returning to America, he was responsible for the successful tour by famous dancer Fanny Elssler in 1840. In 1852, after a sensational trial in front of the High Court of Genoa, he and a conspirator, Frenchman Louis Vannaud, were sentenced to 15 months in prison for attempting to force an heiress, Miss G. C. Gamble, into marriage in order to gain access to her fortune. Wikoff became a close friend of First Lady Mary Todd Lincoln, which created some scandalous gossip. Likely due to this relationship, Wikoff was involved in leaking portions of Abraham Lincoln's 1861 State of the Union Address to the press, which he possibly obtained from Mary Todd Lincoln.

He was friendly with the Bonaparte imperial family in France, and was awarded the Grand Cross of the Legion of Honor by Napoleon III, which gave him the title of Chevalier (Knight), and was made Knight Commander of the Royal Order of Isabella the Catholic, by the King of Spain in 1871. He acted as an undercover reporter for the New York Herald, making use of his presence in government circles.

Wikoff died 28 April 1884 in Brighton, Sussex, England, age 72 or 74.

== Works ==
- Napoleon Louis Bonaparte, First President of France; Biographical and Personal Sketches, Including a Visit to the Prince at the Castle of Ham. New York: George P. Putnam, 1849
- My Courtship and its Consequences. New York: J. C. Derby, 1855
- The Adventures of a Roving Diplomatist. New York: W. P. Fetridge, 1857
- Memoir of Ginevra Guerrabella. New York: T.J. Crowan, 1863
- Reminiscences of an Idler. New York: Fords, Howard & Hulbert, 1880
