= 1860 State of the Union Address =

Speech by US President James Buchanan

- Date: December 3, 1860
- Venue: House Chamber and Senate Chamber, United States Capitol
- Type: State of the Union Address
- Participants: James Buchanan; John C. Breckinridge; William Pennington
- Format: Written
- Previous: 1859 State of the Union Address
- Next: 1861 State of the Union Address

The 1860 State of the Union Address was written by James Buchanan, the 15th president of the United States. It was read on Monday, December 3, 1860, to both houses of the 36th United States Congress, by a clerk. He stated, "Why is it, then, that discontent now so extensively prevails, and the Union of the States, which is the source of all these blessings, is threatened with destruction?"

== The verdict ==
"The long-continued and intemperate interference of the Northern people with the question of slavery in the Southern States has at length produced its natural effects. The different sections of the Union are now arrayed against each other, and the time has arrived, so much dreaded by the Father of his Country, when hostile geographical parties have been formed."

| Preceded by 1859 State of the Union Address | State of the Union addresses 1860 | Succeeded by 1861 State of the Union Address |
