= 1854 State of the Union Address =

Speech by US President Franklin Pierce

- Franklin Pierce 1854
- Date: December 4, 1854
- Venue: House Chamber, United States Capitol
- Location: Washington, D.C.; 38°53′23″N 77°00′32″W
- Type: State of the Union Address
- Participants: Franklin Pierce; David R. Atchison; Linn Boyd
- Format: Written
- Previous: 1853 State of the Union Address
- Next: 1855 State of the Union Address

The 1854 State of the Union Address was delivered by the 14th president of the United States, Franklin Pierce, to the 33rd United States Congress on December 4, 1854.

== Themes ==
This address highlighted both domestic and foreign issues, as Pierce reflected on a tumultuous year for the nation, characterized by widespread disease and poor harvests. Pierce expressed gratitude, however, for the nation's survival and its prosperity amid these challenges, thanking “the God of grace and providence” for America’s resilience.

On foreign policy, Pierce emphasized the importance of non-interference in European conflicts, reaffirming the "wise theory" of avoiding entangling alliances. He criticized European powers for attempting to influence American foreign policy, asserting, “The independent powers of this continent may well assert the right to be exempt from all annoying interference on their part.” Pierce reiterated that America’s territorial growth was lawful and should not be regarded as threatening by other nations.

Pierce also emphasized the need to safeguard neutral rights amid conflicts in Europe and praised the “celebrated confederacy of armed neutrality,” which historically protected American shipping rights. He discussed ongoing negotiations with European powers to ensure neutral rights, mentioning that only Russia had thus far formally recognized America’s propositions for neutral commerce.

On the domestic front, Pierce addressed issues regarding federal power, advocating for limited government in line with the Constitution. He emphasized the federal government’s role in infrastructure, proposing further investment in cross-country transportation routes, particularly a transcontinental railroad to link the Atlantic and Pacific coasts. Pierce also acknowledged the importance of financial responsibility, noting the reduction in public debt and recommending a continued reduction in import duties.

Throughout the address, Pierce upheld his commitment to maintaining peace and fostering economic stability. His address expressed a blend of American optimism and cautious diplomacy, aiming to balance expansionist ambitions with a steadfast dedication to neutrality and self-reliance.

Preceded by 1853 State of the Union Address	State of the Union addresses 1854	Succeeded by 1855 State of the Union Address
