= 1862 State of the Union Address =

Speech by US President Abraham Lincoln

- Date: December 1, 1862
- Location: House Chamber, United States Capitol
- Type: State of the Union Address
- Participants: Abraham Lincoln; Hannibal Hamlin; Galusha A. Grow
- Format: Written
- Previous: 1861 State of the Union Address
- Next: 1863 State of the Union Address

The 1862 State of the Union Address was written by the 16th president of the United States, Abraham Lincoln, and delivered to the 37th United States Congress, on Monday, December 1, 1862, amid the ongoing American Civil War.

This address was Lincoln's longest State of the Union Address, consisting of 8,385 words.

In the closing paragraphs of this address, Lincoln penned words which have been remembered and quoted frequently by presidents and other American political figures. Lincoln's concluding remarks were as follows:

The dogmas of the quiet past are inadequate to the stormy present. The occasion is piled high with difficulty, and we must rise with the occasion. As our case is new, so we must think anew and act anew. We must disenthrall ourselves, and then we shall save our country. Fellow-citizens, we can not escape history. We of this Congress and this Administration will be remembered in spite of ourselves. No personal significance or insignificance can spare one or another of us. The fiery trial through which we pass will light us down in honor or dishonor to the latest generation. We say we are for the Union. The world will not forget that we say this. We know how to save the Union. The world knows we do know how to save it. We, even we here, hold the power and bear the responsibility. In giving freedom to the slave we assure freedom to the free—honorable alike in what we give and what we preserve. We shall nobly save or meanly lose the last best hope of earth. Other means may succeed; this could not fail. The way is plain, peaceful, generous, just—a way which if followed the world will forever applaud and God must forever bless.

== Last best hope of Earth ==
Lincoln in this address coined the phrase that the United States is the "last best hope of Earth." This phrase has been echoed by many US presidents:

- Franklin D. Roosevelt closed his 1939 State of the Union Address by quoting these words from Lincoln.
- Lyndon B. Johnson quoted it in a special message to Congress on equal rights.
- Richard Nixon cited this phrase in his acceptance of the nomination at the 1960 Republican National Convention and again as president in his remarks establishing the Lincoln Home National Historic Site.
- Gerald Ford quoted these words in his remarks on the United States Bicentennial.
- Jimmy Carter quoted the phrase in a live, televised address on national security.
- Ronald Reagan was especially fond of this phrase, as he quoted it at least 50 times in various speeches and writings. Reagan first quoted it in his 1964 "A Time for Choosing" speech. He also alluded to it in four of his State of the Union Addresses (1981, 1982, 1984, and 1987) as well as his Second Inaugural Address.
- George H. W. Bush cited the quote in remarks he made to the American Society of Newspaper Editors.
- Bill Clinton quoted these words in a radio address after the 1994 Northridge earthquake.
- George W. Bush alluded to the phrase in a commencement address at Ohio State University.
- Barack Obama also used the phrase frequently in his speeches, such as when he gave remarks commemorating the 150th anniversary of the Thirteenth Amendment.
- Joe Biden quoted these lines during his remarks after the January 6 United States Capitol attack.

Preceded by 1861 State of the Union Address	State of the Union addresses 1862	Succeeded by 1863 State of the Union Address
