= 1861 State of the Union Address =

Speech by US President Abraham Lincoln

- Date: December 3, 1861
- Location: House Chamber, United States Capitol
- Type: State of the Union Address
- Participants: Abraham Lincoln; Hannibal Hamlin; Galusha A. Grow
- Format: Written
- Previous: 1860 State of the Union Address
- Next: 1862 State of the Union Address

The 1861 State of the Union Address was written by the 16th president of the United States, Abraham Lincoln, and delivered to the 37th United States Congress, on Tuesday, December 3, 1861, amid the American Civil War, which had begun earlier in the year. This was Lincoln's first State of the Union Address and the first since the start of the Civil War. In regard to that war, Lincoln stated that "[t]he last ray of hope for preserving the Union peaceably expired at the assault upon Fort Sumter." He also announced the retirement of Winfield Scott as Commanding General of the United States Army and announced the appointment of George B. McClellan to the post about a month earlier.

== Content ==
Much of Lincoln's address focused on commerce and relationships with foreign nations, especially in light of the Civil War. Lincoln also addressed the fact that there were now three vacancies on the Supreme Court of the United States which he had not yet nominated individuals to fill. He also called for the District of Columbia retrocession, which returned land formerly within the District of Columbia to the State of Virginia, to be undone and for the District of Columbia to regain its former land.

It was also in this address that Lincoln recommended reforming the United States circuit court system to ease the burden of hearing cases on the United States Supreme Court, a practice which was much later adopted.

Besides this, the country generally has outgrown our present judicial system. If uniformity was at all intended, the system requires that all the States shall be accommodated with circuit courts, attended by Supreme judges, while, in fact, Wisconsin, Minnesota, Iowa, Kansas, Florida, Texas, California, and Oregon have never had any such courts. Nor can this well be remedied without a change in the system, because the adding of judges to the Supreme Court, enough for the accommodation of all parts of the country with circuit courts, would create a court altogether too numerous for a judicial body of any sort. And the evil, if it be one, will increase as new States come into the Union. Circuit courts are useful or they are not useful. If useful, no State should be denied them; if not useful, no State should have them. Let them be provided for all or abolished as to all. Three modifications occur to me, either of which, I think, would be an improvement upon our present system. Let the Supreme Court be of convenient number in every event; then, first, let the whole country be divided into circuits of convenient size, the Supreme judges to serve in a number of them corresponding to their own number, and independent circuit judges be provided for all the rest; or, secondly, let the Supreme judges be relieved from circuit duties and circuit judges provided for all the circuits; or, thirdly, dispense with circuit courts altogether, leaving the judicial functions wholly to the district courts and an independent Supreme Court.

Despite the challenges of the Civil War, Lincoln ended upon a note of hope for the future: "The struggle of to-day is not altogether for to-day; it is for a vast future also. With a reliance on Providence all the more firm and earnest, let us proceed in the great task which events have devolved upon us."

This address consisted of 6,987 words.

== Leak to the press ==
Lincoln formally released his address to Congress on December 3, 1861. However, excerpts of his address appeared in the morning edition of the New York Herald (a newspaper known for being anti-Lincoln) hours before it was given to Congress, meaning that someone had leaked Lincoln's address to the press.

The House Judiciary Committee launched an investigation into the leak in February 1862. A correspondent for the New-York Tribune testified that the leak was arranged by Henry Wikoff, a friend of Herald editor James Gordon Bennett Sr. Wikoff claimed that he got his information from "women... members of the president's own family," implicating Mary Todd Lincoln with whom he was a close friend. However, Wikoff refused to name his source explicitly, so he was jailed in the United States Capitol basement for contempt of Congress. Daniel Sickles, then a Union general, visited Wikoff under pretense of being his legal counsel and convinced him to testify that the leaker was White House gardener John Watt, who confessed to the committee the next day. However, Watt, who was involved in several blackmail schemes, likely confessed falsely in exchange for a job at the United States Patent Office after he lost his White House job.

A few days later, Herald correspondent S. P. Hanscom testified that Wikoff had told him earlier that the leaks came from Mary Todd Lincoln. Due to the implication of his wife, Abraham Lincoln became the first sitting president to testify before a committee of Congress. He testified in secret, and he said that only members of his cabinet had seen the address ahead of time, meaning nobody else, including Mary, could have leaked it. The next week, the committee voted not to publish testimony about the role of "any member of the President's family." As the Civil War dragged on and the matter remained unresolved, it faded from public attention.

Preceded by 1860 State of the Union Address	State of the Union addresses 1861	Succeeded by 1862 State of the Union Address
