= 1863 State of the Union Address =

Speech by US President Abraham Lincoln

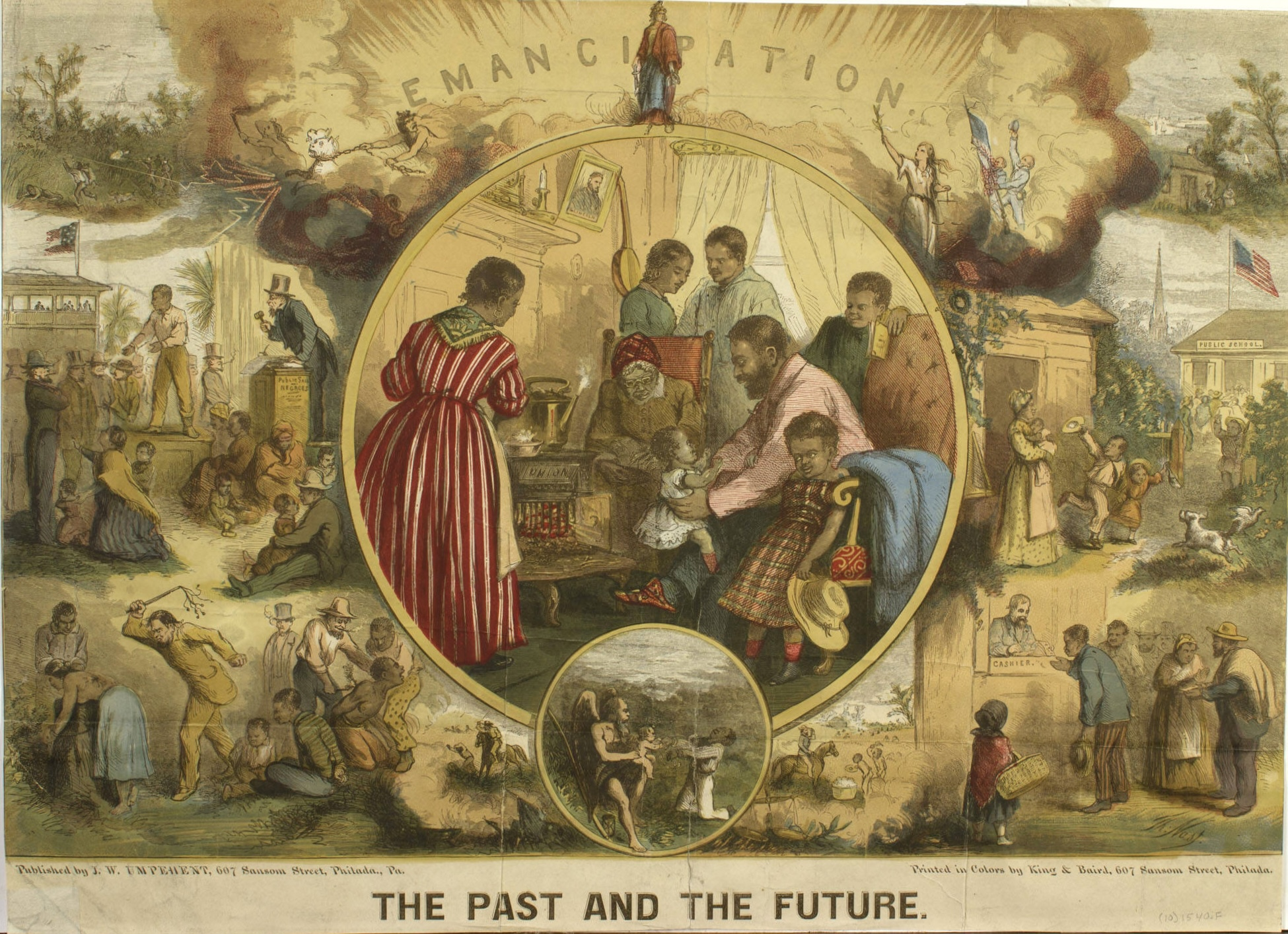
- Emancipation The Past and the Future by Thomas Nast
- Date: December 1, 1863
- Location: House Chamber, United States Capitol
- Type: State of the Union Address
- Participants: Abraham Lincoln; Hannibal Hamlin; Schuyler Colfax
- Format: Written
- Previous: 1862 State of the Union Address
- Next: 1864 State of the Union Address

The 1863 State of the Union Address was written by the 16th president of the United States, Abraham Lincoln, and delivered to the United States Congress, on Tuesday, December 8, 1863, amid the ongoing American Civil War. He said, "The efforts of disloyal citizens of the United States to involve us in foreign wars to aid an inexcusable insurrection have been unavailing," referring to the citizens of the Confederate States of America, and their failed efforts to bring the Emperor of France, Napoleon III, or the British Monarch, Queen Victoria, onto their side. He ended with, "The movements by State action for emancipation in several of the States not included in the emancipation proclamation are matters of profound gratulation."

On foreign policy, the President mentioned the construction of a new telegraph line from the Pacific coast to the Empire of Russia.

On domestic matters the President mentions the rapid construction of the Pacific Railroad. Additionally, the President mentions that 100,000 former slaves were now in the Union military service.

Preceded by 1862 State of the Union Address	State of the Union addresses 1863	Succeeded by 1864 State of the Union Address
