= 1855 State of the Union Address =

Speech by US President Franklin Pierce

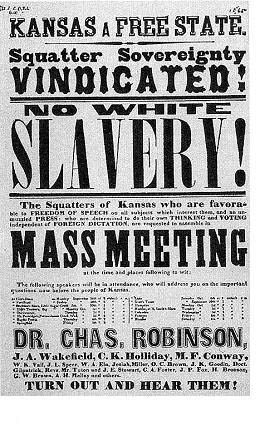
- In the period known as Bleeding Kansas, 1854–1860, there were numerous conflicts about whether slavery would be legal in the future new state of Kansas. This poster calls voters to a series of "free state" meetings.
- Date: December 31, 1855
- Venue: House Chamber, United States Capitol
- Location: Washington, D.C.; 38°53′23″N 77°00′32″W
- Type: State of the Union Address
- Participants: Franklin Pierce; Jesse D. Bright; Linn Boyd
- Format: Written
- Previous: 1854 State of the Union Address
- Next: 1856 State of the Union Address

The 1855 State of the Union Address was delivered by the 14th president of the United States, Franklin Pierce, to the 34th United States Congress on December 31, 1855.

== Themes ==
Pierce began by noting the stability and peace enjoyed by the United States compared to the conflicts troubling Europe. He expressed relief that the nation had remained free from external wars and internal strife, though he cautioned about unresolved disputes with Great Britain over Central American interests, particularly the Bay Islands and British influence over the Mosquito Coast.

Pierce highlighted the conflict with Great Britain on the interpretation of the Clayton-Bulwer Treaty, asserting that Britain’s continued territorial claims in Central America contradicted the treaty’s terms. He stated, "It is impossible, in my judgment, for the United States to acquiesce in such a construction of the respective relations of the two Governments to Central America," affirming his administration’s commitment to challenging British encroachments in the region.

Domestically, Pierce addressed sectional tensions surrounding slavery, emphasizing the principle of states' rights and defending recent policies, such as the Kansas-Nebraska Act, that allowed new territories to determine their own institutions. He warned against Northern interference in the South’s domestic institutions, calling it "offensive and hopeless" and insisting that the Constitution did not permit one state to dictate the policies of another.

Pierce’s address also covered other issues such as ongoing tensions with Spain over incidents involving U.S. vessels and the need for naval and postal improvements. He concluded with a call for national unity and fidelity to the Constitution, urging Americans to reject sectionalism and preserve the Union.

Preceded by 1854 State of the Union Address	State of the Union addresses 1855	Succeeded by 1856 State of the Union Address
