= 1858 State of the Union Address =

Speech by US President James Buchanan

- Date: December 6, 1858
- Venue: House Chamber, United States Capitol
- Location: Washington, D.C.; 38°53′23″N 77°00′32″W
- Type: State of the Union Address
- Participants: James Buchanan; John C. Breckinridge; James L. Orr
- Format: Written
- Previous: 1857 State of the Union Address
- Next: 1859 State of the Union Address

The 1858 State of the Union address was delivered by James Buchanan, the 15th president of the United States, to the 35th United States Congress on December 6, 1858. In this address, Buchanan discussed the status of Kansas, tensions between the North and South, foreign policy with Spain, and internal improvements.

Buchanan opened by noting the nation’s gratitude to "Almighty Providence" for its improved state over the previous year, despite "sectional strife" on slavery, especially regarding Kansas's proposed admission as a state. He expressed satisfaction that "the Supreme Court... decided that all American citizens have an equal right to take into the Territories whatever is held as property," asserting this was a recognized principle by Congress.

On foreign policy, Buchanan addressed disputes with Spain regarding claims for injuries to American citizens and delays in compensation, particularly concerning actions by Spanish officials in Cuba. He also referenced a diplomatic mission to Mexico, highlighting the need for stability on the southwestern border due to lawlessness among Native Americans and Mexicans.

Buchanan voiced concern over Utah's governance, recalling the deployment of federal troops to ensure compliance with federal law after "open rebellion." By 1858, he reported that peace was restored under Governor Alfred Cumming, a replacement for Brigham Young. Buchanan praised the restraint of federal troops stationed at Fort Bridger amid severe winter conditions.

Buchanan also addressed financial distress in the country and proposed a revenue tariff as a remedy for the national deficit caused by a recent economic downturn. He advocated for specific duties on certain goods to ensure steady revenue and protect American industry.

| Preceded by 1857 State of the Union Address | State of the Union addresses 1858 | Succeeded by 1859 State of the Union Address |
