= 1853 State of the Union Address =

Speech by US President Franklin Pierce

- Date: December 5, 1853
- Venue: House Chamber, United States Capitol
- Location: Washington, D.C.; 38°53′23″N 77°00′32″W
- Type: State of the Union Address
- Participants: Franklin Pierce; David R. Atchison; Linn Boyd
- Format: Written
- Previous: 1852 State of the Union Address
- Next: 1854 State of the Union Address

The 1853 State of the Union Address was delivered by the 14th president of the United States, Franklin Pierce, to the 33rd United States Congress on December 5, 1853. This address marked Pierce's first annual message to Congress, emphasizing themes of national prosperity, international relations, and the importance of federal restraint in domestic policy. Pierce opened by celebrating the peace and prosperity the United States was experiencing, calling it "a time of remarkable progress" and "unusual blessings." He emphasized the importance of national integrity and suggested that the nation's success was sustained by the favor of Providence.

A major focus of Pierce's address was foreign relations. He discussed a variety of diplomatic challenges, including disputes with Great Britain regarding fishing rights in the North Atlantic. Pierce announced that negotiations had been opened to establish more favorable agreements for American fishermen. Pierce also highlighted issues in Central America and his hope that disputes over British influence in the region could be resolved amicably. Additionally, he referenced tensions over the seizure of Hungarian-born Martin Koszta by Austrian authorities, expressing that Koszta was entitled to U.S. protection, an assertion that had drawn Austria's protests. "The acts of our officers, under the circumstances of the case, were justifiable," Pierce asserted.

Regarding domestic issues, Pierce focused on federalism, stressing that federal powers should be limited to those clearly outlined in the Constitution and advocating a restrained role for the federal government. He argued that internal improvements, including road construction, should be carefully considered, particularly regarding state and federal jurisdiction. Reflecting the expansionist spirit of the time, Pierce mentioned the significance of recent territory acquisitions, predicting that the population might reach 100 million within decades. He urged Congress to prioritize infrastructure that would connect the Atlantic and Pacific coasts, especially advocating for the construction of a transcontinental railroad.

Pierce closed by reflecting on the passing of Vice President William R. King earlier in the year. King had taken the oath of office in Cuba due to illness but died in April 1853 shortly after returning to Alabama. Pierce acknowledged the challenges ahead but expressed his commitment to promoting "the honor and advancement of my country."

Preceded by 1852 State of the Union Address	State of the Union addresses 1853	Succeeded by 1854 State of the Union Address
