= 1859 State of the Union Address =

Speech by US President James Buchanan

- Date: December 19, 1859
- Venue: House Chamber and Senate Chamber, United States Capitol
- Type: State of the Union Address
- Participants: James Buchanan; John C. Breckinridge
- Format: Written
- Previous: 1858 State of the Union Address
- Next: 1860 State of the Union Address

The 1859 State of the Union Address was written by James Buchanan, the 15th president of the United States. It was read to both houses of the 36th United States Congress on Monday, December 19, 1859, by a clerk. Predicting the American Civil War, he stated, "Whilst it is the duty of the President 'from time to time to give to Congress information of the state of the Union,' I shall not refer in detail to the recent sad and bloody occurrences at Harpers Ferry. Still, it is proper to observe that these events, however bad and cruel in themselves, derive their chief importance from the apprehension that they are but symptoms of an incurable disease in the public mind, which may break out in still more dangerous outrages and terminate at last in an open war by the North to abolish slavery in the South."

On foreign policy, the President advocated for the use of the Navy in cases where American merchant vessels encountered hostility in the ports of Mexico and Spanish held territories.

On domestic affairs, the President endorsed the completion of the transcontinental railroad, noting its importance in the case of national security.

Preceded by 1858 State of the Union Address	State of the Union addresses 1859	Succeeded by 1860 State of the Union Address
