= 1856 State of the Union Address =

Speech by US President Franklin Pierce

- Date: December 2, 1856
- Venue: House Chamber, United States Capitol
- Location: Washington, D.C.; 38°53′23″N 77°00′32″W
- Type: State of the Union Address
- Participants: Franklin Pierce; Nathaniel P. Banks
- Format: Written
- Previous: 1855 State of the Union Address
- Next: 1857 State of the Union Address

The 1856 State of the Union Address was given by Franklin Pierce, the 14th president of the United States. It was presented to the 34th United States Congress by the Clerk of the United States House of Representatives. He said, "it is necessary only to say that the internal prosperity of the country, its continuous and steady advancement in wealth and population and in private as well as public well-being, attest the wisdom of our institutions and the predominant spirit of intelligence and patriotism which, notwithstanding occasional irregularities of opinion or action resulting from popular freedom, has distinguished and characterized the people of America." He also stated, "In the long series of acts of indirect aggression, the first was the strenuous agitation by citizens of the Northern States, in Congress and out of it, of the question of Negro emancipation in the Southern States." President Pierce supported the Kansas-Nebraska act. This neutralized the issue of slavery in the central states, and did not say whether to allow it or not.

The President closed his final message with a message looking towards the future by saying:

We have at length reached that stage of our country's career in which the dangers to be encountered and the exertions to be made are the incidents, not of weakness, but of strength. In foreign relations we have to attemper our power to the less happy condition of other Republics in America and to place ourselves in the calmness and conscious dignity of right by the side of the greatest and wealthiest of the Empires of Europe. In domestic relations we have to guard against the shock of the discontents, the ambitions, the interests, and the exuberant, and therefore sometimes irregular, impulses of opinion or of action which are the natural product of the present political elevation, the self-reliance, and the restless spirit of enterprise of the people of the United States.

Preceded by 1855 State of the Union Address	State of the Union addresses 1856	Succeeded by 1857 State of the Union Address
