= 1857 State of the Union Address =

Speech by US President James Buchanan

- Date: December 8, 1857
- Venue: House Chamber, United States Capitol
- Location: Washington, D.C.; 38°53′23″N 77°00′32″W
- Type: State of the Union Address
- Theme: Economic crisis, Kansas issue, foreign relations
- Participants: James Buchanan; John C. Breckinridge; James L. Orr
- Format: Written
- Previous: 1856 State of the Union Address
- Next: 1858 State of the Union Address

The 1857 State of the Union address was delivered by President James Buchanan to the United States Congress on December 8, 1857, addressing economic turmoil, tensions over slavery in Kansas, and diplomatic concerns. Presiding over the session was Speaker of the House of Representatives James L. Orr and Vice President of the United States John C. Breckinridge.

== Themes ==
President Buchanan began by thanking "Almighty God for the numerous benefits" bestowed on the country, but he noted that despite abundant harvests, the nation faced severe economic distress. Describing a "deplorable condition" in the economy, he linked the downturn to the "extravagant and vicious system of paper currency and bank credits," which he asserted encouraged "wild speculations and gambling in stocks." Buchanan warned that the current financial crisis exposed the vulnerability of over-reliance on unbacked paper currency, managed by state banks without adequate regulation. He argued that a "sound circulating medium" was essential for the country's stability.

Regarding Kansas, Buchanan noted the turmoil caused by opposing factions over slavery. He emphasized the principle of popular sovereignty, urging that the people of Kansas be allowed to determine whether slavery would be permitted within their state constitution. Buchanan's hope was for a peaceful resolution, recommending that Kansans vote directly on the issue of slavery to secure "the peace and quiet of the whole country."

On international affairs, Buchanan discussed the recently resolved tensions with Great Britain, highlighting the peaceful settlement and reiterating the importance of British-American relations. Additionally, he referenced difficulties with Spain and urged Congress to address outstanding claims, including the unresolved indemnity from the Amistad incident. Buchanan also mentioned ongoing diplomatic efforts with Persia and renewed interest in relations with China, emphasizing the value of commercial opportunities and peaceful negotiations.

Buchanan closed by reflecting on the need for governmental and personal "economy" in public and private expenditures. He recommended a focus on core national projects, including expanding the military, advancing infrastructure like the Pacific Railroad, and improving postal service efficiency. He urged Congress to consider the interest of the District of Columbia, as its residents lacked congressional representation but deserved federal attention.

Preceded by 1856 State of the Union Address	State of the Union addresses 1857	Succeeded by 1858 State of the Union Address
