= 1864 State of the Union Address =

Speech by US President Abraham Lincoln

- Date: December 6, 1864
- Location: House Chamber, United States Capitol
- Type: State of the Union Address
- Participants: Abraham Lincoln; Hannibal Hamlin; Schuyler Colfax
- Format: Written
- Previous: 1863 State of the Union Address
- Next: 1865 State of the Union Address

The 1864 State of the Union Address was given by Abraham Lincoln, the 16th president of the United States. It was presented to the United States Congress on Tuesday, December 6, 1864. It was given before the end of the American Civil War. He said: "The war continues. Since the last annual message all the important lines and positions then occupied by our forces have been maintained and our arms have steadily advanced, thus liberating the regions left in rear, so that Missouri, Kentucky, Tennessee, and parts of other States have again produced reasonably fair crops. The most remarkable feature in the military operations of the year is General Sherman's attempted march of 300 miles directly through the insurgent region."

On foreign relations, the President mentions friendly relations with most Central and South American nations. On domestic matters the President noted the rapid construction of the first transcontinental railroad and telegraph lines.

On the matter of slavery the President said:

I retract nothing heretofore said as to slavery. I repeat the declaration made a year a ago, that "while I remain in my present position I shall not attempt to retract or modify the emancipation proclamation, nor shall I return to slavery any person who is free by the terms of that proclamation or by any of the acts of Congress." If the people should, by whatever mode or means, make it an Executive duty to reenslave such persons, another, and not I, must be their instrument to perform it. In stating a single condition of peace I mean simply to say that the war will cease on the part of the Government whenever it shall have ceased on the part of those who began it.

Preceded by 1863 State of the Union Address	State of the Union addresses 1864	Succeeded by 1865 State of the Union Address
