= Timeline of the Andrew Jackson presidency =

The presidency of Andrew Jackson began on March 4, 1829, when Andrew Jackson was inaugurated as the 7th president of the United States, and ended on March 4, 1837, after two terms.

== 1829 ==
=== March 1829 ===
- March 4
  - Andrew Jackson is inaugurated as the seventh president of the United States. It is the first inauguration to take place on the East Portico of the U.S. Capitol so it can accommodate the thousands in attendance.
  - James Alexander Hamilton becomes acting secretary of state while Martin Van Buren prepares to take office. Charles Hay serves as acting secretary of the navy.
- March 6
  - Samuel D. Ingham becomes secretary of the treasury.
  - Jackson nominates John McLean to the Supreme Court of the United States. He nominates John Wilson Campbell and Samuel Hadden Harper to the District Courts for the District of Ohio and District of Louisiana, respectively.
- March 9 – John Eaton becomes secretary of war, John M. Berrien becomes attorney general, William T. Barry becomes postmaster general, and John Branch becomes secretary of the navy.
- March 23 – Jackson issues a statement encouraging the Creek people to relocate west of the Mississippi River.
- March 28 – Martin Van Buren enters into duty as secretary of state.

=== July 1829 ===
- July 29 – The United States signs the Second Treaty of Prairie du Chien with several Indian tribes.

=== August 1829 ===
- August 1 – The United States signs the Third Treaty of Prairie du Chien with the Winnebago people.
- August 3 – The United States signs the Treaty of Little Sandusky with the Delaware people.
- August 13 – Secretary of State Martin Van Buren begins negotiations with Mexico to determine national boundaries.
- August 27 – The United States signs a treaty of commerce and navigation with Austria.

=== September 1829 ===
- September 24 – The United States signs the Treaty of James Fork with the Delaware people.

=== December 1829 ===
- December 7 – The 21st United States Congress convenes for its first session.
- December 8 – Jackson delivers the 1829 State of the Union Address.

== 1830 ==
=== January 1830 ===
- January 4 – Jackson nominates Henry Baldwin to the Supreme Court.

=== March 1830 ===
- March 12 – The Supreme Court issues its decision in Craig v. Missouri. It rules that state governments cannot issue loan certificates because they are a form of paper money which can only be distributed by the federal government.
- March 28 – The United States signs a convention of claims with Denmark.

=== April 1830 ===
- April 13 – Vice President John C. Calhoun encourages South Carolina to nullify the Tariff of Abominations. Jackson threatens to send soldiers to South Carolina if it does this.

=== May 1830 ===
- May 7 – The United States signs the Ottoman-American Treaty of Commerce and Navigation with the Ottoman Empire.
- May 27 – Jackson vetoes funding for the Maysville Road. He argues that it should be funded locally.
- May 28 – The Indian Removal Act is passed, ordering the population transfer of Indian tribes in the United States. One fourth of the expelled population will die in the process, and it will come to be known as the Trail of Tears.
- May 29 – The Preemption Act of 1830 is passed. It allows people who settled and cultivated public land in 1829 to purchase the land.
- May 31
  - Jackson signs a bill authorizing funding for work on Cumberland Road.
  - Jackson vetoes funding for the Washington Turnpike Road Company, citing his veto of the Maysville Road for only being of local interest.
  - The 21st United States Congress adjourns from its first session.

=== July 1830 ===
- July 15 – The United States signs the Fourth Treaty of Prairie du Chien with several Indian tribes.

=== September 1830 ===
- September 27 – The United States signs the Treaty of Dancing Rabbit Creek with the Choctaw.

=== October 1830 ===
- October 8 – Jackson appoints Philip P. Barbour to the District Court for the Eastern District of Virginia.

=== November 1830 ===
- November 2 – Jackson appoints Matthew Harvey to the District Court for the District of New Hampshire as a recess appointment.

=== December 1830 ===
- December 6
  - Jackson delivers the 1830 State of the Union Address.
  - The 21st United States Congress convenes for its second session.
- December 7 – Jackson pocket vetoes funding for internal improvements.
- December 14 – Jackson nominates his recess appointments Philip P. Barbour and Matthew Harvey to their respective seats.

== 1831 ==
=== February 1831 ===
- February 3 – The 1831 Revision of the Copyright Act is passed.
- February 8 – The United States signs the Treaty of Washington with the Menominee.
- February 15 – Vice President John C. Calhoun publishes his correspondences with Jackson regarding the First Seminole War, angering Jackson.
- February 28 – The United States signs the Treaty of Washington with the Seneca people.

=== March 1831 ===
- March 3 – The 21st United States Congress adjourns from its second session.
- March 18 – The Supreme Court issues its decision in Cherokee Nation v. Georgia, the first of the two Cherokee Cases. It rules that the Cherokee Nation is not a sovereign nation and the court does not have jurisdiction over disputes between state governments and Indian tribes.

=== April 1831 ===
- April 5 – The United States signs a treaty of amity, commerce, and navigation with Mexico.
- April 7 – The Petticoat affair causes a series of resignations in Jackson's cabinet.
- April 14 – Jackson appoints Thomas Irwin (American politician) to the District Court for the Western District of Pennsylvania as a recess appointment.

=== May 1831 ===
- May 12 – John Boyle becomes acting secretary of the navy.
- May 23 – Levi Woodbury succeeds John Branch as secretary of the navy.
- May 24 – Edward Livingston succeeds Martin Van Buren as secretary of state.

=== June 1831 ===
- June 20 – Philip G. Randolph becomes acting secretary of war.
- June 21 – Asbury Dickins becomes acting secretary of the treasury.

=== July 1831 ===
- July 4 – The United States signs a convention of claims and duties on wines and cotton with France. France agrees to pay a $5 million spoliation claim. It does not pay until 1836.
- July 20
  - Roger B. Taney becomes attorney general.
  - The United States signs the Treaty of Lewistown with the Seneca and Shawnee.
- July 21 – Attorney General Roger B. Taney becomes acting secretary of war.

=== August 1831 ===
- August 1 – Lewis Cass becomes secretary of war.
- August 8
  - Louis McLane succeeds Samuel D. Ingham as secretary of the treasury.
  - The United States signs the Treaty of Wapakoneta with the Shawnee.
- August 21 – Nat Turner's Rebellion begins. Jackson responds with military force without issuing the legally required proclamation.
- August 30 – The United States signs the Treaty of Miami Bay with the Ottawa people.

=== September 1831 ===
- September 3 – Nat Turner's Rebellion is defeated.
- September 26 – The Anti-Masonic Party holds the first presidential nominating convention in the United States. Its address includes a statement that Jackson is a freemason.

=== December 1831 ===
- December 5 – The 22nd United States Congress convenes for its first session.
- December 6 – Jackson delivers the 1831 State of the Union Address.
- December 7 – Jackson nominates his recess appointment Thomas Irwin to his seat on the District Court for the Western District of Pennsylvania.
- December 12 – The National Republican Party holds a presidential nominating convention. It nominates Henry Clay to run against Jackson.

== 1832 ==
=== January 1832 ===
- January 29 – The United States signs a treaty with the Wyandot people.

=== February 1832 ===
- February 15 – Jackson asks Congress to authorize commissioners to oversee the expulsion of Indian tribes.

=== March 1832 ===
- March 3 – The Supreme Court issues its decision in Worcester v. Georgia, the second of the two Cherokee Cases. It rules that state governments cannot impose licensing requirements to live in Indian tribes. Jackson opposes the decision in support of states' rights.
- March 24 – The United States signs the Treaty of Cusseta with the Creek people.

=== April 1832 ===
- April 1 – Jackson nominates Upton Scott Heath to the District Court for the District of Maryland.
- April 6 – Black Hawk of the Sauk people launches an attack on Illinois to reclaim tribal lands, starting the Black Hawk War.
- April 20 – The springs of Hot Springs, Arkansas, are made the first federal reservation for a natural resource.

=== May 1832 ===
- May 9 – The United States signs the Treaty of Payne's Landing with the Seminole people.
- May 16 – The United States signs a treaty of peace, amity, commerce, and navigation with Chile.
- May 21 – The Democratic Party holds a presidential nomination convention. It nominates Jackson as its presidential nominee and Martin Van Buren as his running mate.

=== July 1832 ===
- July 3 – The first of the Patent Acts of 1832 is passed, allowing reissues of patents when they are mistakenly invalidated.
- July 10 – Jackson vetoes a renewal of the Second Bank of the United States. His opponents raised the issue of renewal before its deadline because they believed Jackson's opposition to the bank would reduce his support for reelection.
- July 13
  - The second of the Patent Acts of 1832 is passed, allowing noncitizen residents to apply for patents in some circumstances when they intend to become citizens.
  - Jackson nominates Powhatan Ellis to the District Court for the District of Mississippi.
- July 14 – The Tariff of 1832 is passed.
- July 16 – The 22nd United States Congress adjourns from its first session.

=== August 1832 ===
- August 2 – Black Hawk's forces are defeated in the Battle of Bad Axe.

=== September 1832 ===
- September 15 – The United States signs a treaty with the Winnebago people.
- September 21 – The United States signs a treaty with the Sauk people and Fox people.

=== October 1832 ===
- October 11 – The United States signs a treaty with the Apalachicola.
- October 14 – The United States signs a convention of claims with the Kingdom of the Two Sicilies.
- October 20 – The United States signs the Treaty of Pontotoc Creek with the Chickasaw.
- October 24 – The United States signs a treaty with the Kickapoo.
- October 26 – The United States signs treaties with the Potawatomi, the Shawnee, and the Delaware.
- October 27 – The United States signs treaties with the Potawatomi, the Kaskaskia, the Peoria, and the Menominee.
- October 29 – The United States signs a treaty with the Piankeshaw and the Wea.

=== November 1832 ===
- November 6 – Jackson wins the 1832 presidential election.
- November 24 – South Carolina passes the Ordinance of Nullification. This says that South Carolina is nullifying federal laws related to duties on imports and that they are no longer applicable in the state.

=== December 1832 ===
- December 3 – The 22nd United States Congress convenes for its second session.
- December 4 – Jackson delivers the 1832 State of the Union Address.
- December 5 – The Electoral College casts its votes for the presidency. Jackson receives 219 electoral votes, defeating Henry Clay and his 49 electoral votes.
- December 6 – Jackson pocket vetoes a settlement of states' interest on wartime funding advances. He cites the method Congress calculated the interest.
- December 10 – Jackson issues the Proclamation to the People of South Carolina, declaring nullification invalid and threatening to enforce compliance with the military. This causes the nullification crisis.
- December 18 – The United States signs a treaty of commerce and navigation with Russia.
- December 28 – John C. Calhoun resigns as vice president.
- December 29 – The United States signs a treaty with the Seneca and the Shawnee.

== 1833 ==
=== January 1833 ===
- January 16 – Jackson delivers a message to Congress requesting action against South Carolina's nullification of federal law.

=== February 1833 ===
- February 13 – The 1832 electoral votes are counted by Congress.
- February 14 – The United States signs treaties with the Western Cherokee and the Creeks.
- February 18 – The United States signs a treaty with the Ottawa.

=== March 1833 ===
- March 2
  - The nullification crisis ends when the Tariff of 1833 and the Force Bill are passed. The new tariff is set to decrease over time, satisfying the demands of South Carolina, and the Force Bill grants Jackson the power to enforce tariffs with the military.
  - The 22nd United States Congress adjourns from its second session.
- March 4 – Jackson is inaugurated for his second term.
- March 15 – South Carolina ends its policy of nullification.
- March 20
  - Jackson appoints Edmund Roberts to negotiate trade treaties with other nations, including the country's first trade agreements in east Asia.
  - The United States signs a treaty of amity and commerce with Siam.
- March 28 – The United States signs a treaty with the Seminole.

=== April 1833 ===
- April 26 – Jackson meets with Black Hawk at the White House.

=== May 1833 ===
- May 13 – The United States signs a treaty with the Quapaw.
- May 29 – Louis McLane succeeds Edward Livingston as secretary of state. William J. Duane succeeds McLane as secretary of the treasury.

=== June 1833 ===
- June 6 – Jackson becomes the first president to ride a train. He travels from Ellicott's Mills to Baltimore.
- June 18 – The United States signs a treaty with the Apalachicola.
- June 26 – Jackson orders the removal of deposits from the Bank of the United States.

=== September 1833 ===
- September 18 – Jackson reads a message to his Cabinet on the issue of treasury deposits.
- September 21
  - The United States signs a treaty of amity and commerce with Muscat.
  - The United States signs a treaty with the Oto and Missouri people.
- September 23 – Attorney General Roger B. Taney succeeds William J. Duane as secretary of the treasury. The office of attorney general is left vacant.
- September 26 – The United States signs the Treaty of Chicago with the United Chippewa, Ottawa, and Potawatomi.

=== October 1833 ===
- October 9 – The United States signs a treaty with the Pawnee people.
- October 12 – Jackson appoints Benjamin Tappan to the District Court for the District of Ohio.

=== November 1833 ===
- November 15 – Benjamin Butler succeeds Roger B. Taney as attorney general.

=== December 1833 ===
- December 2 – The 23rd United States Congress convenes for its first session.
- December 3 – Jackson delivers the 1833 State of the Union Address.
- December 4 – Jackson pocket vetoes a bill regarding land grants to states.
- December 11 – The Senate requests a copy of the September 18 message Jackson read to his Cabinet. Jackson refuses to provide it.
- December 18 – Jackson nominates Morgan Welles Brown to the District Court for the Eastern District of Tennessee.
- December 26 – Senator Henry Clay introduces a resolution to censure Jackson for his actions regarding the Bank of the United States.

== 1834 ==
=== January 1834 ===
- January 20 – Jackson nominates his recess appointment Benjamin Tappan to his seat on the District Court for the District of Ohio, but the Senate does not confirm the nomination.

=== February 1834 ===
- February 17 – The United States signs a settlement of claims with Spain.
- February 20 – Jackson nominates Thomas Bell Monroe to the District Court for the District of Kentucky.

=== March 1834 ===
- March 28 – The Senate censures Jackson for attempting to withdraw federal deposits and give them to state banks. It accuses him of exercising powers that are not within the president's authority.

=== April 1834 ===
- April 15 – Jackson delivers a message to the Senate protesting its censure of him.

=== May 1834 ===
- May 7 – The Senate decides against entering Jackson's message of protest into its journal.
- May 24 – The United States signs a treaty with the Chickasaw.

=== June 1834 ===
- June 21 – Jackson issues a proclamation recognizing the death of General Marquis de Lafayette, an American ally from France.
- June 24 – The Senate rejects Jackson's nomination of Roger B. Taney as secretary of the treasury.
- June 25 – McClintock Young becomes acting secretary of the treasury.
- June 27 – John Forsyth succeeds Louis McLane as secretary of state. Secretary of the Navy Levi Woodbury succeeds Roger B. Taney as secretary of the treasury.
- June 28
  - The Coinage Act of 1834
  - Jackson nominates Humphrey H. Leavitt to the District Court for the District of Ohio.
- June 30
  - The Indian Trade and Intercourse Act is passed. It designates unincorporated land west of the Mississippi River as Indian Territory and regulates trade with Indian tribes.
  - The 1834 Indian Reorganization Act is passed to regulate trade and diplomacy with Indian tribes.
  - Mahlon Dickerson succeeds Levi Woodbury as secretary of the navy.
  - The Secretary of the Navy is authorized to conduct experiments to improve the safety of steam engines.
  - Congress authorizes the purchase of George Washington's books and papers.
  - The 23rd United States Congress adjourns from its first session.

=== October 1834 ===
- October 23 – The United States signs a treaty with the Miami.

=== December 1834 ===
- December 1
  - The 23rd United States Congress convenes for its second session.
  - Jackson delivers the 1834 State of the Union Address. It includes a declaration that the national debt of the United States will be repaid entirely within the month.
- December 4 – The United States signs a treaty with Comoza's Band of the Potawatomi.
- December 10 – The United States signs a treaty with Muck Rose's Band of the Potawatomi.
- December 16 – The United States signs a treaty with the Potawatomi.
- December 17 – The United States signs a treaty with Mota's Band of the Potawatomi.

== 1835 ==
=== January 1835 ===
- January 6 – Jackson nominates James M. Wayne to the Supreme Court.
- January 15 – Jackson nominates Roger B. Taney to the Supreme Court, but no vote is ever held to confirm the nomination.
- January 30 – Richard Lawrence makes an assassination attempt against Jackson, but his pistols misfire.

=== February 1835 ===
- February 22 – The Senate forms a committee to determine whether Senator George Poindexter was involved in the assassination attempt against Jackson.

=== March 1835 ===
- March 3
  - Jackson vetoes the "act to authorize the Secretary of the Treasury to compromise the claims allowed by the commissioners under the treaty with the King of the Two Sicilies, concluded October 14, 1832". He describes it as violating the government's separation of powers.
  - The 23rd United States Congress adjourns from its second session.

=== April 1835 ===
- April 3 – The United States signs a treaty of boundaries with Mexico.

=== May 1835 ===
- May 1 – Amos Kendall succeeds William T. Barry as postmaster general.
- May 20 – The 1835 Democratic National Convention begins. The Democratic Party unanimously selects Martin Van Buren as its nominee.

=== July 1835 ===
- July 1
  - The United States signs a treaty with the Caddo.
  - The first volume of Democracy in America by Alexis de Tocqueville is published.

=== August 1835 ===
- August 24 – The United States signs a treaty with several Indian tribes.

=== September 1835 ===
- September 16 – Jackson appoints Jesse Lynch Holman to the District Court for the District of Indiana as a recess appointment.

=== December 1835 ===
- December 7 – The 24th United States Congress convenes for its first session.
- December 8 – Jackson delivers the 1835 State of the Union Address.
- December 17 – Jackson informs Congress that James Smithson has requested the creation of an institution of knowledge.
- December 28 – The Dade battle, the first battle of the Second Seminole War, takes place.
- December 28 – Jackson nominates Roger B. Taney to be Chief Justice of the United States.
- December 29 – The United States signs the Treaty of New Echota with a Cherokee Nation group that did not have authority to negotiate for the Cherokee. It mandates that the Cherokee be sent west of the Mississippi river.

== 1836 ==
=== January 1836 ===
- January 12 – Jackson nominates George Adams to the District Court for the District of Mississippi.
- January 20 – The United States signs a treaty of peace, friendship, navigation, and commerce with Venezuela.

=== March 1836 ===
- March 2 – The Republic of Texas declares independence.
- March 6 – The Battle of the Alamo ends.
- March 15 – Robert B. Taney is confirmed as Chief Justice of the United States.
- March 21 – Jackson nominates his recess appointment Jesse Lynch Holman to his seat on the District Court for the District of Indiana.
- March 26 – The United States signs a treaty with Mesquawbuck's Band the Potawatomi.
- March 28 – The United States signs the 1836 Treaty of Washington with the Ottawa and the Chippewa.
- March 29 – The United States signs a treaty with Waukewa's Band the Potawatomi.

=== April 1836 ===
- April 6 – Jackson nominates Peter V. Daniel to the District Court for the Eastern District of Virginia.
- April 11 – The United States signs a treaty with Aubbeenaubee's Band of the Potawatomi.
- April 22 – The United States signs a treaty with the Potawatomi.
- April 23 – The United States signs a treaty with the Potawatomi.

=== May 1836 ===
- May 9
  - The frigate USS Columbia is launched at Washington Navy Yard. It had first been authorized by Congress in 1816 and construction had begun in 1825.
  - The United States signs a treaty with the Swan Creek and Black River Bands of the Chippewa.
- May 18 – The Treaty of New Echota is ratified.
- May 31 – The brig USS Porpoise is launched.

=== June 1836 ===
- June 15
  - Arkansas is admitted as the 25th state of the United States.
  - The northern boundary of Ohio is defined.
- June 16 – Jackson nominates Robert William Wells to the District Court for the District of Missouri.
- June 17 – The brig USS Dolphin is launched at New York Navy Yard.
- June 23 – The Deposit Act of 1836 is passed, allowing the federal government to distribute surplus funds to the states.
- June 27 – Jackson nominates Benjamin Johnson to the District Court for the District of Arkansas.
- June 28 – Jackson nominates Andrew T. Judson to the District Court for the District of Connecticut.

=== July 1836 ===
- July 1 – Congress authorizes negotiation with the United Kingdom to accept the estate of James Smithson. Smithson had bequeathed funds to establish the Smithsonian Institution.
- July 2
  - The Post Office Act of 1836 is passed to organize the funding and governance of the United States Post Office Department.
  - Jackson signs a bill allocating $1.8 million to fund the expulsion of the Cherokee people.
  - Jackson nominates Ross Wilkins to the District Court for the District of Michigan.
- July 4
  - The United States Patent Office is established and new regulations for patents are implemented.
  - The 24th United States Congress adjourns from its first session.
- July 11 – Jackson issues the Specie Circular. It says the government will only accept land payments made in silver or gold.
- July 14 – "Detachment one" of the Muscogee Emigration of 1836 (Creek Removal) departs Montgomery, Alabama.

=== August 1836 ===
- August 5 – The United States signs a treaty with the Potawatomi.

=== September 1836 ===
- September 1 – Jackson issues Proclamation 43-B: "Suspending Discriminating Duties on Vessels of the Grand Dukedom of Tuscany".
- September 3 – The United States signs the Treaty of the Cedars with the Menominee.
- September 10 – The United States signs a treaty with Wahashaw's Band of the Sioux.
- September 16 – The United States signs a treaty of peace and friendship with Morocco.
- September 17 – The United States signs a treaty with Iowa, Sauk, and Fox peoples.
- September 20 – The United States signs a treaty with Mematway's and Chequawrako's Bands of the Potawatomi.
- September 22 – The United States signs a treaty with Mosack's Band of the Potawatomi.
- September 23 – The United States signs a treaty with the Wabash Potawatomi.
- September 27 – The United States signs a treaty with the Sauk and Fox peoples.
- September 28 – The United States signs a treaty with the Sauk and Fox peoples.

=== October 1836 ===
- October 5 – Commissioner of Indian Affairs Carey A. Harris becomes acting secretary of war.
- October 15 – The United States signs a treaty with several Indian tribes.
- October 26 – Attorney General Benjamin Butler becomes acting secretary of war.

=== November 1836 ===
- November 8 – The 1836 presidential election takes place. Martin Van Buren is elected president.
- November 30
  - The United States signs a treaty of peace, friendship, commerce, and navigation with the Peru–Bolivian Confederation.
  - The United States signs a treaty with the Sioux.

=== December 1836 ===
- December 5 – The 24th United States Congress convenes for its second session.
- December 6 – Jackson delivers the 1836 State of the Union Address.

== 1837 ==
=== January 1837 ===
- January 14 – The United States signs the Treaty of Detroit with the Saginaw Band of the Chippewa.
- January 16 – The 1834 censure of Jackson is expunged from the Senate's records.
- January 17 – The United States signs a treaty with the Choctaw and Chickasaw.
- January 18 – The Coinage Act of 1837 is passed to regulate the designs and compositions of federal coinage.
- January 26 – Michigan is admitted as the 26th state of the United States.

=== February 1837 ===
- February 6 – Jackson sends Congress a list of unresolved claims with Mexico.
- February 11
  - The Supreme Court issues its decision in Briscoe v. Bank of Kentucky. It rules that state-chartered banks can issue banknotes so long as they are not state-owned.
  - The United States signs a treaty with the Potawatomi.
- February 14 – The Supreme Court issues its decision in Charles River Bridge v. Warren Bridge. It rules that Massachusetts did not violate the Contract Clause of the Constitution by hiring a company to build a bridge when it had previously chartered a different company to build a bridge in the same area.

=== March 1837 ===
- March 1 – Jackson recognizes the sovereignty of Texas.
- March 3
  - Jackson nominates Alcée Louis la Branche as charge d'affaires to Texas.
  - Jackson pocket vetoes "An act designating and limiting the funds receivable for the revenues of the United States" because he deems it too vague.
  - The Eighth and Ninth Circuits Act of 1837 grows the Supreme Court from seven justices to nine.
  - Jackson nominates John Catron to the Supreme Court. He also nominates William Smith, but Smith declines.
  - The 24th United States Congress adjourns from its second session.
- March 4 – Jackson's presidency ends and Martin Van Buren is inaugurated as president.

== Works cited ==
- Bevans, Charles I. (1968). Treaties and Other International Agreements of the United States of America, 1776-1949. United States Department of State.
- Hall, Kermit L.; Ely, James W., eds. (2009). The Oxford Guide to United States Supreme Court Decisions (2nd ed.). Oxford University Press.
- Stathis, Stephen W. (2014). Landmark Legislation 1774–2012: Major U.S. Acts and Treaties (2nd ed.). CQ Press. ISBN 978-1-4522-9230-4.
