= Timeline of the Martin Van Buren presidency =

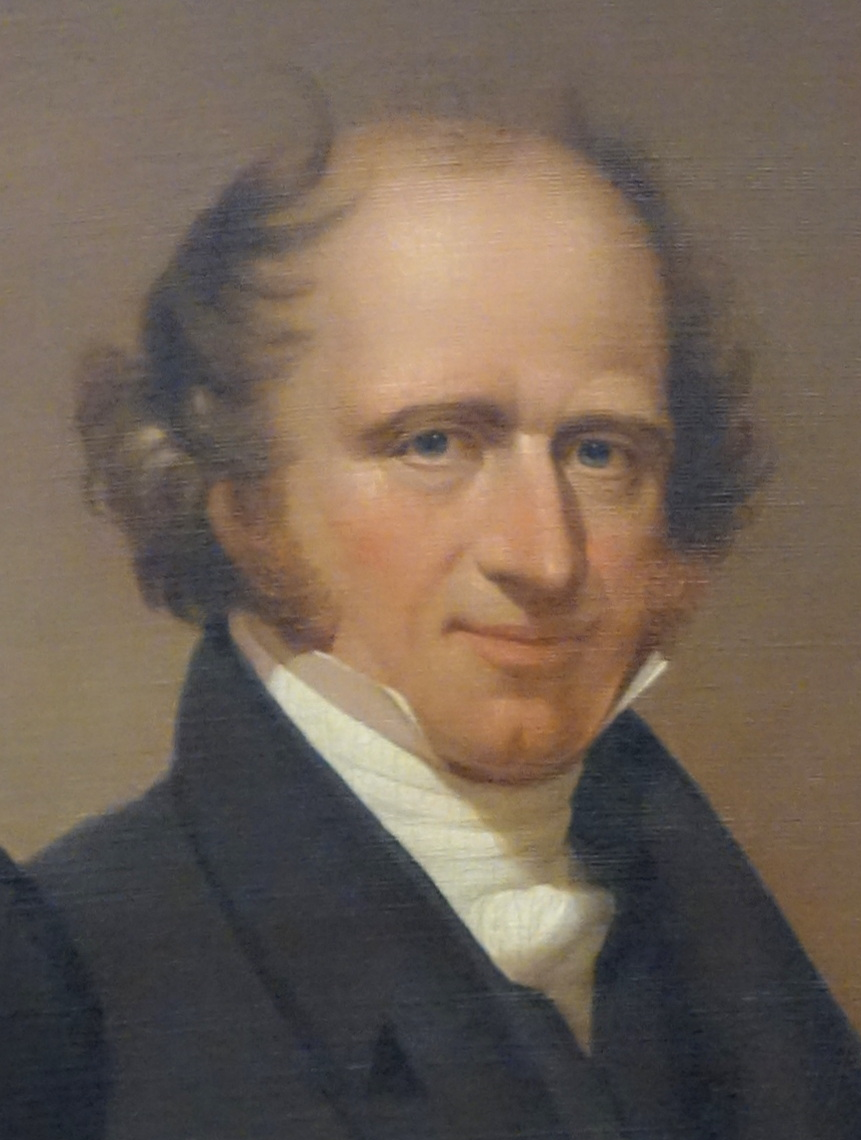
Martin Van Buren

The presidency of Martin Van Buren began on March 4, 1837, when Martin Van Buren was inaugurated as the 8th president of the United States, and ended on March 4, 1841, after one term.

== 1837 ==
=== March 1837 ===
- March 4 – Martin Van Buren is inaugurated as the eighth president of the United States. Richard Mentor Johnson becomes vice president. Van Buren retains John Forsyth as secretary of state, Levi Woodbury as secretary of the treasury, Benjamin Butler as attorney general, Amos Kendall as postmaster general, and Mahlon Dickerson as secretary of the navy. Butler also serves as acting secretary of war.
- March 7 – Joel Roberts Poinsett becomes secretary of war.
- March 27 – Secretary of State John Forsyth takes the position that American treaties with Mexico prohibit Texas annexation.
- March 28 – Van Buren issues Proclamation 43C, which revokes all Indian claims to land between Missouri and the Missouri River.

=== April 1837 ===
- April 22 – Van Buren appoints John McKinley to the Supreme Court as a recess appointment.

=== May 1837 ===
- May 10 – New York banks stop redeeming banknotes in gold and silver after the credit system collapses. This marks the beginning of an economic depression, the Panic of 1837.
- May 18 – The side wheel steamer USS Fulton is launched at New York Navy Yard.
- May 26 – The United States signs a treaty with the Kataka, Kiowa, and Tawakaro peoples.

=== June 1837 ===
- June 25 – James Kirke Paulding is selected as secretary of the navy, to take effect on June 30.
- June 27 – Officials in Maine allege that British forces in Canada are encroaching on the state's territory and request that Van Buren review the disputed boundary, which had been set by the Treaty of Paris in 1783.
- June 30 – James Kirke Paulding succeeds Mahlon Dickerson as secretary of the navy.

=== July 1837 ===
- July 18 – The ship-of-the-line USS Pennsylvania is launched at the Philadelphia Navy Yard. It is the largest sailing ship ever built for the United States Navy.
- July 29 – The United States signs a treaty with the Chippewa.

=== August 1837 ===
- August 4 – The Republic of Texas proposes its annexation to the United States.
- August 5 – Van Buren rejects Texas annexation. He hopes that this stance will avoid controversy around introducing a new slave state while also improving relations with Mexico.

=== September 1837 ===
- September 4 – The 25th United States Congress convenes for its first session. Van Buren convenes Congress in a special session to address the Panic of 1837. He asks for the creation of an Independent Treasury.
- September 6 – Van Buren nominates Philip Kissick Lawrence to the District Courts for the Eastern District and Western District of Louisiana.
- September 18 – Van Buren nominates his recess appointment John McKinley to the Supreme Court.
- September 25 – The Senate confirms Van Buren's nomination of John McKinley to the Supreme Court.
- September 29 – The United States signs a treaty with the Mississippi Sioux.
- September 30 – Van Buren submits a proposal of Texas annexation to the House of Representatives.

=== October 1837 ===
- October 12 – The treasury is authorized to issue $10 million in treasury notes in response to the Panic of 1837.
- October 16 – The 25th United States Congress adjourns from its special session.
- October 21 – The United States signs treaties with the Yankton Sioux, Sauk, and Fox peoples.

=== November 1837 ===
- November – American citizens cross into Upper Canada and Lower Canada to fight against the British in the Rebellions of 1837–1838. Van Buren has General Winfield Scott negotiate with them to prevent further action.
- November 1 – The United States signs a treaty with the Winnebago people.
- November 23 – The United States signs a treaty with the Iowa people.

=== December 1837 ===
- December 2 – The sloop-of-war USS Cyane is launched at the Boston Navy Yard.
- December 4 – The 25th United States Congress convenes for its second session.
- December 5
  - Van Buren delivers the 1837 State of the Union Address. He proposes the creation of an Independent Treasury and addresses the nation's respective border disputes with Mexico and British Canada.
  - Canadian politician William Lyon Mackenzie launches the Upper Canada Rebellion against British rule. The American steamship Caroline provides supplies for his rebellion.
- December 21 – Van Buren authorizes the creation of an Independent Treasury.
- December 22 – The United States signs a treaty of commerce and navigation with the Kingdom of Greece.
- December 25 – The Battle of Lake Okeechobee occurs during the Second Seminole War. American General Zachary Taylor declares victory after facing significant losses.
- December 28 – The sloop-of-war USS Levant is launched at the New York Navy Yard.
- December 29 – British Canada raids and burns the American steamship Caroline for assisting Canadian rebels. This begins the Caroline affair.

== 1838 ==
=== January 1838 ===
- January 4 – News of the Caroline affair reaches Washington, D.C.
- January 5 – Van Buren informs Congress of his belief that the United States is unable to protect its borders under existing laws. He has the United States remain neutral in the affair and the incursions of American citizens against British Canada.
- January 15 – The United States signs the Second Treaty of Buffalo Creek with the Iroquois.

=== February 1838 ===
- February 3 – The United States signs a treaty with the Oneida First Christian and Orchard Parties.

=== March 1838 ===
- March 12 – The Supreme Court issues its decision in Kendall v. United States. It rules that Congress has the power to assign ministerial duties to members of the Cabinet of the United States and that these are enforceable by the courts.

=== April 1838 ===
- April 11 – The United States and the Republic of Texas sign a convention to resolve disputes around the capture of Texan ships Pocket and Durango.
- April 25 – The United States and the Republic of Texas sign a convention to resolve border disputes.

=== May 1838 ===
- May 2 – Van Buren delivers a message to the House of Representatives about conflict with Mexico over civilian steamboats.
- May 10 – Van Buren delivers a message to the House of Representatives warning that the federal government risks becoming insolvent.
- May 21 – Van Buren delivers a message to Congress regarding the expulsion of the Cherokee people.
- May 26 – The Cherokee removal takes place during the Trail of Tears as 16,000 Cherokee people are forcibly displaced. Approximately one fourth of the Cherokee population dies in the process.
- May 31 – The Specie Circular is repealed and the means used to pay debts to the federal government are reformed.

=== June 1838 ===
- June 12 – The Iowa Territory is created by dividing the Wisconsin Territory.

=== July 1838 ===
- July 5 – Felix Grundy is selected as attorney general, effective September 1.
- July 9 – The 25th United States Congress adjourns from its second session.

=== August 1838 ===
- August 18 – The United States Exploring Expedition launches from Norfolk, Virginia, to survey the Pacific Ocean.

=== September 1838 ===
- September 1 – Felix Grundy succeeds Benjamin Butler as attorney general.
- September 11 – Van Buren orders the creation of an arbitration commission to negotiate border disputes with Mexico.

=== October 1838 ===
- October 19 – The United States signs a treaty with the Iowa people.

=== November 1838 ===
- November 6 – The United States signs a treaty with the Miami people.
- November 21 – Van Buren issues a proclamation declaring neutrality in the Canadian rebellions and refusing assistance to American citizens participating in the conflict.
- November 23 – The United States signs a treaty with the Creek people.
- November 26 – The United States signs a treaty of commerce and navigation with the Kingdom of Sardinia.
- November 27 – Van Buren's son, Abraham Van Buren II, marries Angelica Singleton. Singleton becomes acting first lady after the couple returns from their honeymoon.

=== December 1838 ===
- December 3
  - The 25th United States Congress convenes for its third session.
  - Van Buren delivers the 1838 State of the Union Address.

== 1839 ==
=== January 1839 ===
- January 11 – The United States signs a treaty with the Osage people.
- January 19 – The United States signs a treaty of commerce and navigation with the Netherlands.

=== February 1839 ===
- February 7 – The United States signs a treaty with the Chippewa.
- February 9 – Van Buren nominates Samuel J. Gholson to the District Courts for the Northern District and Southern District of Mississippi.
- February 20 – Duels are banned in Washington, D.C.
- February 27 – Van Buren delivers a message to Congress calling for an end to the Aroostook War, a border dispute between Maine in the United States and New Brunswick in Canada.

=== March 1839 ===
- March 3
  - The Census Act of 1840 establishes the United States Census Office.
  - The United States Patent Office is authorized to collect agricultural statistics and distribute seeds.
  - A law is passed authorizing the president to raise a militia of 50,000 volunteers in the event of a British attack on Maine.
  - The 25th United States Congress adjourns from its third session.
- March 5 – Van Buren issues the only veto of his presidency. He vetoes a joint resolution because it was not certified by the clerk of the House of Representatives.
- March 9 – The Supreme Court issues its decision in Bank of Augusta v. Earle. It rules that state governments can impose restrictions on corporations from doing business when the corporations are from other states, but that restrictions must be written explicitly into law.
- March 21 – General Winfield Scott negotiates an end to the Aroostook War.
- March 25 – A treaty is signed to end the Aroostook War.

=== April 1839 ===
- April 11 – A convention is signed to resolve claims between the United States and Mexico.
- April 23 – Van Buren appoints Isaac S. Pennybacker to the District Court for the Western District of Virginia as a recess appointment.
- April 24 – The sloop-of-war USS Marion is launched at the Boston Navy Yard.

=== May 1839 ===
- May 11 – Van Buren appoints John Cochran Nicoll to the District Court for the District of Georgia as a recess appointment.
- May 13 – Van Buren announces that a compensation agreement has been reached between the United States and the United Kingdom. The United Kingdom had taken slaves from the slave ships Comet, Encomium, and Enterprise after they ran ashore on the British Bahamas and Bermuda.

=== June 1839 ===
- June 13
  - The United States signs a treaty of peace, friendship, navigation, and commerce with Ecuador.
  - The sloop-of-war USS Preble launches at the Portsmouth Navy Yard.
- June 20 – Van Buren begins a tour of Pennsylvania, New Jersey, and New York to rehabilitate public perception of his economic policy.

=== August 1839 ===
- August 24 – The Washington captures the Cuban ship La Amistad. La Amistad had been a slave ship that was taken over in a slave rebellion.

=== September 1839 ===
- September 3 – The United States signs a treaty with the Stockbridge and Munsee Delaware people.

=== October 1839 ===
- October 16 – Van Buren returns from his tour of Pennsylvania, New Jersey, and New York without a significant increase in his approval.
- October 30 – Van Buren appoints Robert Budd Gilchrist to the District Court for the District of South Carolina as a recess appointment.

=== November 1839 ===
- November 8 – The sloop-of-war USS Dale is launched at the Philadelphia Navy Yard.
- November 13 – The Liberty Party holds a convention as an abolitionist movement. It selects James G. Birney as its presidential nominee, but he declines.

=== December 1839 ===
- December 2
  - The 26th United States Congress convenes for its first session.
  - Van Buren delivers the 1839 State of the Union Address. He rejects the notion of a national debt and calls for the criminalization of using public funds for private purposes.
- December 4 – The 1839 Whig National Convention is held in Pennsylvania. The Whig Party selects William Henry Harrison as its presidential nominee and John Tyler as his running mate.
- December 31 – Van Buren announces a peace treaty with Ecuador.

== 1840 ==
=== January 1840 ===
- January 11 – Henry D. Gilpin succeeds Felix Grundy as attorney general.
- January 13 – Van Buren calls on Congress to remove Indian peoples from New York.
- January 23 – Van Buren nominates his recess appointments John Cochran Nicoll and Isaac Samuels Pennybacker to their respective district court seats.
- January 29 – Van Buren nominates his recess appointment Robert Budd Gilchrist to the District Court for the District of South Carolina.

=== March 1840 ===
- March 4 – The Supreme Court dismisses Holmes v. Jennison, determining that it has no jurisdiction over the denial of habeas corpus by a state court.
- March 16 – The sloop-of-war USS Decatur departs from New York for its first assignment after being launched.
- March 31 – Van Buren issues an executive order, a ten-hour workday as the maximum for federal employees.

=== May 1840 ===
- May 5 – The Democratic Party holds the 1840 Democratic National Convention. It selects Van Buren as its presidential nominee but is unable to agree on his running mate.
- May 19 – John Milton Niles is selected as postmaster general, to take effect on May 25.
- May 20 – The United States signs a treaty of commerce and navigation with the Kingdom of Hanover.
- May 25 – John Milton Niles succeeds Amos Kendall as postmaster general.

=== June 1840 ===
- June 10 – The United States implements regulations of commerce, consular rights, and shipping with the peoples of Fiji.
- June 27 – Van Buren calls for the creation of an exploratory committee to resolve the border dispute between Maine and British Canada.
- June 29 – Van Buren asks Congress to prepare the military in anticipation of a possible British attack.

=== July 1840 ===
- July 4 – The Independent Treasury Act creates an Independent Treasury by splitting the Department of the Treasury from individual banks.
- July 14 – Van Buren nominates Mahlon Dickerson to the District Court for the District of New Jersey.
- July 21 – The 26th United States Congress adjourns from its first session.

=== August 1840 ===
- August 26 – The United States signs a treaty of commerce and navigation with the Kingdom of Portugal.

=== September 1840 ===
- September 19 – Hearings take place in Hartford, Connecticut, in regard to the slave rebellion on La Amistad. The district court rules that the slaves should be sent to Africa.

=== November 1840 ===
- November 10 – The 1840 presidential election is held. William Henry Harrison of the Whig Party defeats Martin Van Buren with 234 electoral votes, compared to Van Buren's 60. The election has the highest turnout of any presidential election to this point in time with 80 percent of the electorate voting.
- November 15 – The sloop-of-war USS Yorktown is commissioned after its launch at the Norfolk Navy Yard the previous year.
- November 28 – The United States signs the Treaty of the Wabash with the Miami people.

=== December 1840 ===
- December 5 – Van Buren delivers the 1840 State of the Union Address. He criticizes the slave trade and calls for a peaceful resolution to the border dispute between Maine and British Canada.
- December 7 – The 26th United States Congress convenes for its second session.

== 1841 ==
=== February 1841 ===
- February 10 – The electoral votes of the 1840 presidential election are counted.
- February 22 – Van Buren nominates Philemon Dickerson to the District Court for the District of New Jersey.
- February 26 – Van Buren nominates Peter V. Daniel to the Supreme Court. He nominates John Y. Mason to the District Court for the Eastern District of Virginia.

=== March 1841 ===
- March 2 – The Senate confirms Peter V. Daniel's nomination to the Supreme Court.
- March 3 – The 26th United States Congress adjourns from its second session.
- March 4 – Van Buren's presidency ends and William Henry Harrison is inaugurated as the ninth president. Van Buren will be nominated for president by the Free Soil Party in 1848, but he will not receive any electoral votes.

== Works cited ==
- Bevans, Charles I. (1968). Treaties and Other International Agreements of the United States of America, 1776-1949. United States Department of State.
- Hall, Kermit L.; Ely, James W., eds. (2009). The Oxford Guide to United States Supreme Court Decisions (2nd ed.). Oxford University Press.
- Stathis, Stephen W. (2014). Landmark Legislation 1774–2012: Major U.S. Acts and Treaties (2nd ed.). CQ Press. ISBN 978-1-4522-9230-4.
