= 1830 State of the Union Address =

Speech by US President Andrew Jackson

- Date: December 6, 1830
- Venue: House Chamber, United States Capitol
- Location: Washington, D.C.; 38°53′23″N 77°00′32″W
- Type: State of the Union Address
- Participants: Andrew Jackson; John C. Calhoun; Andrew Stevenson
- Format: Written
- Previous: 1829 State of the Union Address
- Next: 1831 State of the Union Address

The 1830 State of the Union Address was given by the seventh United States president, Andrew Jackson on Tuesday, December 6, 1830, to both houses of the United States Congress. He said, "What good man would prefer a toe covered with forests and ranged by a few thousand savages to our extensive Republic, studded with cities, towns, and prosperous farms, embellished with all the improvements which art can devise or industry execute, occupied by more than 12,000,000 happy people, and filled with all the blessings of liberty, civilization, and religion?" He speaks of the Indian Removal Act, "With a full understanding of the subject, the Choctaw and the Chickasaw tribes have with great unanimity determined to avail themselves of the liberal offers presented by the act of Congress, and have agreed to remove beyond the Mississippi River."

The address also contains mention of the state of US commerce ships and their ability to trade in the Black Sea, as well as trade relations with the Ottoman Empire and Russia, all of which were reported by the President as satisfactory.

Preceded by 1829 State of the Union Address	State of the Union addresses 1830	Succeeded by 1831 State of the Union Address
