= 1833 State of the Union Address =

Speech by US President Andrew Jackson

- Date: December 3, 1833
- Venue: House Chamber, United States Capitol
- Location: Washington, D.C.; 38°53′23″N 77°00′32″W
- Type: State of the Union Address
- Participants: Andrew Jackson; Martin Van Buren; Andrew Stevenson
- Format: Written
- Previous: 1832 State of the Union Address
- Next: 1834 State of the Union Address

The 1833 State of the Union Address was delivered by the seventh president of the United States, Andrew Jackson, on December 3, 1833, to the 23rd United States Congress. In this address, Jackson celebrated the nation's prosperity and expressed optimism about the continued peace and health of the country, as well as the flourishing of its commerce and industry.

Jackson also discussed ongoing foreign relations, particularly with Great Britain and France. He expressed hope for a resolution to the North East boundary dispute with Great Britain and voiced concerns over France's delay in fulfilling its financial obligations under the 1831 treaty. He affirmed the United States' commitment to peaceful and just relations with all nations, emphasizing mutual respect and reciprocity.

Domestically, Jackson reiterated his support for the ongoing Indian Removal, noting the progress made in negotiating treaties that would relocate tribes west of the Mississippi River. He portrayed this policy as beneficial both to the Native American tribes and to the growing population of settlers. Jackson also highlighted the nation's successful efforts to pay down the national debt and called for continued fiscal responsibility, warning against unnecessary expenditures.

Additionally, Jackson addressed the controversial issue of the Second Bank of the United States, reaffirming his opposition to the institution's practices. He criticized the bank for attempting to influence elections and urged Congress to carefully consider the role of the bank in the nation's economy. Jackson's actions regarding the removal of federal deposits from the Bank of the United States were a significant topic in the address.

Preceded by 1832 State of the Union Address	State of the Union addresses 1833	Succeeded by 1834 State of the Union Address
