= 1834 State of the Union Address =

Speech by US President Andrew Jackson

- Date: December 1, 1834
- Venue: House Chamber, United States Capitol
- Location: Washington, D.C.; 38°53′23″N 77°00′32″W
- Type: State of the Union Address
- Participants: Andrew Jackson; Martin Van Buren; John Bell
- Format: Written
- Previous: 1833 State of the Union Address
- Next: 1835 State of the Union Address

The 1834 State of the Union Address was delivered by the seventh president of the United States, Andrew Jackson, to the 23rd United States Congress on December 1, 1834. Jackson highlighted the continued prosperity and peaceful conditions in the nation, praising the harvests and the flourishing commerce. He urged Congress to ensure that "virtue and enterprise" remained central to the country's development.

On foreign affairs, Jackson discussed ongoing diplomatic relations with European nations, including Great Britain, regarding the unresolved North East boundary dispute. He also reported delays in France fulfilling its financial obligations under the 1831 treaty, and expressed disappointment over the French Chamber of Deputies' refusal to appropriate funds for indemnities owed to American citizens. Jackson recommended Congress authorize "reprisals upon French property" if France continued its delay.

Domestically, Jackson reiterated his opposition to the Second Bank of the United States, criticizing its actions as a "scourge of the people." He condemned the bank for using its funds to influence elections and for the illegal withholding of dividends owed to the federal government. Jackson called for Congress to fully sever ties with the bank, recommending that laws connecting the government to the bank be repealed and the public stock be sold.

The President also addressed the state of Native American affairs, particularly the ongoing Indian Removal efforts. He reported progress in negotiating the relocation of the Creek and Seminole tribes but expressed disappointment that the Cherokee had not yet agreed to move west of the Mississippi River. Jackson emphasized that emigration was necessary to preserve the remaining tribes.

Preceded by 1833 State of the Union Address	State of the Union addresses 1834	Succeeded by 1835 State of the Union Address
