= 1839 State of the Union Address =

Speech by US President Martin Van Buren

- Date: December 2, 1839
- Venue: House Chamber, United States Capitol
- Location: Washington, D.C.; 38°53′23″N 77°00′32″W
- Type: State of the Union Address
- Participants: Martin Van Buren; Richard Mentor Johnson
- Format: Written
- Previous: 1838 State of the Union Address
- Next: 1840 State of the Union Address

The 1839 State of the Union Address was delivered by the eighth president of the United States Martin Van Buren to the 26th United States Congress on December 2, 1839. Van Buren opened by noting that while the country had experienced several challenges, including fires, disease, and ongoing trade difficulties in key cities, the nation continued to benefit from prosperity in agriculture. He praised the season's abundant harvests, noting that “no means of individual comfort is more certain and no source of national prosperity is so sure” as agriculture.

== Themes ==
Van Buren discussed foreign policy, highlighting a steady relationship with Great Britain. He expressed optimism about resolving the Aroostook War, describing a British proposal for a commission to survey the boundary and prevent future territorial disagreements. He also emphasized that no domestic military measures had been necessary to protect this boundary, calling this restraint evidence of his administration's commitment to diplomacy over aggression.

On the domestic front, Van Buren addressed the economic situation following the Panic of 1837, emphasizing his administration's efforts to stabilize the financial system and reduce dependency on banking institutions. He reiterated the dangers of excessive national and state debts, warning that borrowing abroad created long-term dependency on foreign creditors and highlighted the importance of curtailing expenditures to maintain financial independence.

Van Buren also focused on the Florida Territory, where peace efforts with the Seminole tribe had broken down, leading to renewed conflict in the Second Seminole War. He requested additional Congressional support for military efforts to quell resistance in the region and facilitate the removal of the Seminole population to lands west of the Mississippi. The address further included detailed considerations about the financial administration of public lands, advocating for legislation to allow settlers preemptive rights to purchase and calling for revised pricing for land left unsold in earlier sales.

In closing, Van Buren spoke to the importance of sustaining U.S. sovereignty in financial practices, emphasizing the risk of reliance on banks that were vulnerable to international pressures and recessions. He urged Congress to consider reforms that would ensure economic independence and help fortify public trust in American institutions.

Preceded by 1838 State of the Union Address	State of the Union addresses 1839	Succeeded by 1840 State of the Union Address
