= 1837 State of the Union Address =

Speech by US President Martin Van Buren

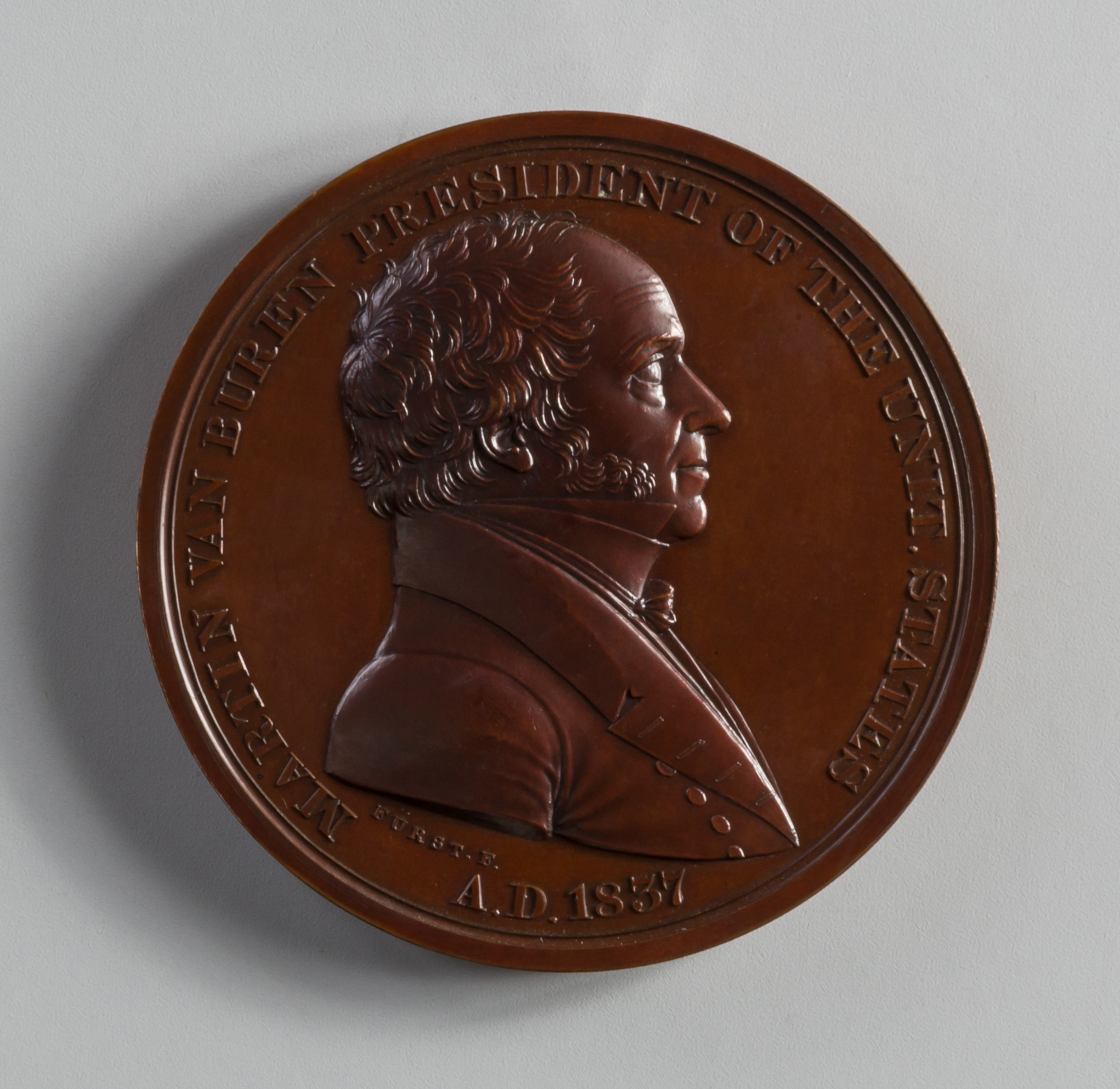
- Date: December 5, 1837
- Venue: House Chamber, United States Capitol
- Location: Washington, D.C.; 38°53′23″N 77°00′32″W
- Type: State of the Union Address
- Participants: Martin Van Buren; Richard M. Johnson; James K. Polk
- Format: Written
- Previous: 1836 State of the Union Address
- Next: 1838 State of the Union Address

The 1837 State of the Union Address was given by the eighth president of the United States, Martin Van Buren, on December 5, 1837. It was presented to the 25th United States Congress by a clerk, because it was not yet the custom for the president to deliver it himself. He began with, "We have reason to renew the expression of our devout gratitude to the Giver of All Good for His benign protection. Our country presents on every side the evidences of that continued favor under whose auspices it, has gradually risen from a few feeble and dependent colonies to a prosperous and powerful confederacy."

The President reported a new treaty of commerce which was signed with the Peru-Bolivian Confederation and the status of the Seminole Wars was approaching victory.

| Preceded by 1836 State of the Union Address | State of the Union addresses 1837 | Succeeded by 1838 State of the Union Address |
