= 1835 State of the Union Address =

Speech by US President Andrew Jackson

- Date: December 8, 1835
- Venue: House Chamber, United States Capitol
- Location: Washington, D.C.; 38°53′23″N 77°00′32″W
- Type: State of the Union Address
- Participants: Andrew Jackson; Martin Van Buren; James K. Polk
- Format: Written
- Previous: 1834 State of the Union Address
- Next: 1836 State of the Union Address

The 1835 State of the Union Address was delivered by the seventh president of the United States, Andrew Jackson, on December 8, 1835, to the 24th United States Congress. This was Jackson's seventh annual message, and he used it to reflect on both domestic successes and challenges as his presidency neared its conclusion. He emphasized the nation's growing prosperity, highlighting the "unexampled growth and prosperity" of the United States, and stressed the importance of unity to avoid the internal conflicts that had disrupted other nations.

Jackson detailed the settlement of various diplomatic issues, including relations with Great Britain, noting that negotiations over the northeastern boundary were ongoing but not yet resolved. He urged caution in foreign policy, warning against any threat to national sovereignty or unity, which he saw as essential for the nation's continued strength.

One key focus was the successful reduction of the national debt, a significant achievement of his administration. Jackson proudly noted that all public debt had been paid, stating, "since my last annual communication, all the remains of the public debt have been redeemed." He further advocated for fiscal responsibility and sound money policies to protect the nation's financial system.

On domestic matters, Jackson reiterated his support for the controversial Indian Removal policy, asserting that relocating Native Americans west of the Mississippi River was necessary for their survival. He reported progress in removing the Cherokee and other tribes, emphasizing that the policy was intended for their benefit, despite opposition from some quarters.

Jackson also addressed the increasingly heated debate over the role of the Bank of the United States, reiterating his opposition to its influence over national finances and governance. He criticized the bank for promoting a "monopoly" over the economy and insisted that its dissolution was necessary to maintain republican principles.

The speech, delivered near the end of Jackson's second term, reflected his vision of a united, financially independent, and sovereign nation, free from foreign domination and internal monopolies.

Preceded by 1834 State of the Union Address	State of the Union addresses 1835	Succeeded by 1836 State of the Union Address
