= 1832 State of the Union Address =

Speech by US President Andrew Jackson

- Date: December 4, 1832
- Venue: House Chamber, United States Capitol
- Location: Washington, D.C.; 38°53′23″N 77°00′32″W
- Type: State of the Union Address
- Participants: Andrew Jackson; John C. Calhoun; Andrew Stevenson
- Format: Written
- Previous: 1831 State of the Union Address
- Next: 1833 State of the Union Address

The 1832 State of the Union Address was written by Andrew Jackson, the seventh president of the United States. It was delivered to the 22nd United States Congress by a clerk on Tuesday, December 4, 1832. He said, "Although the pestilence which had traversed the Old World has entered our limits and extended its ravages over much of our land, it has pleased Almighty God to mitigate its severity and lessen the number of its victims compared with those who have fallen in most other countries over which it has spread its terrors." He ended with, "Limited to a general superintending power to maintain peace at home and abroad, and to prescribe laws on a few subjects of general interest not calculated to restrict human liberty, but to enforce human rights, this Government will find its strength and its glory in the faithful discharge of these plain and simple duties."

Notably, the President mentioned a case of a US commerce ship being attacked by pirates off the west coast of Sumatra. In addition the President reported that negotiations with Native Americans for removal was proceeding as planned with the exception of the Cherokees of Georgia.

Preceded by 1831 State of the Union Address	State of the Union addresses 1832	Succeeded by 1833 State of the Union Address
