= 1840 State of the Union Address =

Speech by US President Martin Van Buren

- Date: December 5, 1840
- Venue: House Chamber, United States Capitol
- Location: Washington, D.C.; 38°53′23″N 77°00′32″W
- Type: State of the Union Address
- Participants: Martin Van Buren; Richard Mentor Johnson; Robert M. T. Hunter
- Format: Written
- Previous: 1839 State of the Union Address
- Next: 1841 State of the Union Address

The 1840 State of the Union Address was delivered by the eighth president of the United States Martin Van Buren to the 26th United States Congress on December 5, 1840. Van Buren highlighted the country's blessings of “health, plenty, and peace,” as well as the strength of its foreign policy, grounded in the principle of neutrality, which he credited with fostering strong international relationships and preserving domestic tranquility. He commended the country's success in maintaining “peaceful relations” and noted that tensions regarding the Aroostook War with Great Britain appeared close to resolution.

Domestically, Van Buren addressed financial policy in the aftermath of the Panic of 1837, asserting his administration's commitment to federal independence from banks. He praised recent legislation for “safe-keeping the public money,” emphasizing that a federal surplus could otherwise lead to excessive spending and future debt. His statement underlined his administration's efforts to avoid national debt and limit banking power, which he associated with economic volatility and foreign influence.

Van Buren also discussed ongoing military campaigns in Florida, where Seminole resistance persisted. The federal government's efforts to remove Native American tribes westward, he stated, would continue, despite the challenges and costs incurred in the Second Seminole War. “More than 40,000 Indians have been removed” to new territories, he claimed, noting that this policy was essential for both the welfare of the tribes and the security of U.S. borders.

Van Buren's address concluded with a focus on American neutrality and economic independence, restating the benefits of a national stance that avoids both foreign debt and domestic banking monopolies. He warned against future entanglements, calling for a “steady adherence” to fiscal discipline and constitutional principles.

Preceded by 1839 State of the Union Address	State of the Union addresses 1840	Succeeded by 1841 State of the Union Address
