= 1831 State of the Union Address =

Speech by US President Andrew Jackson

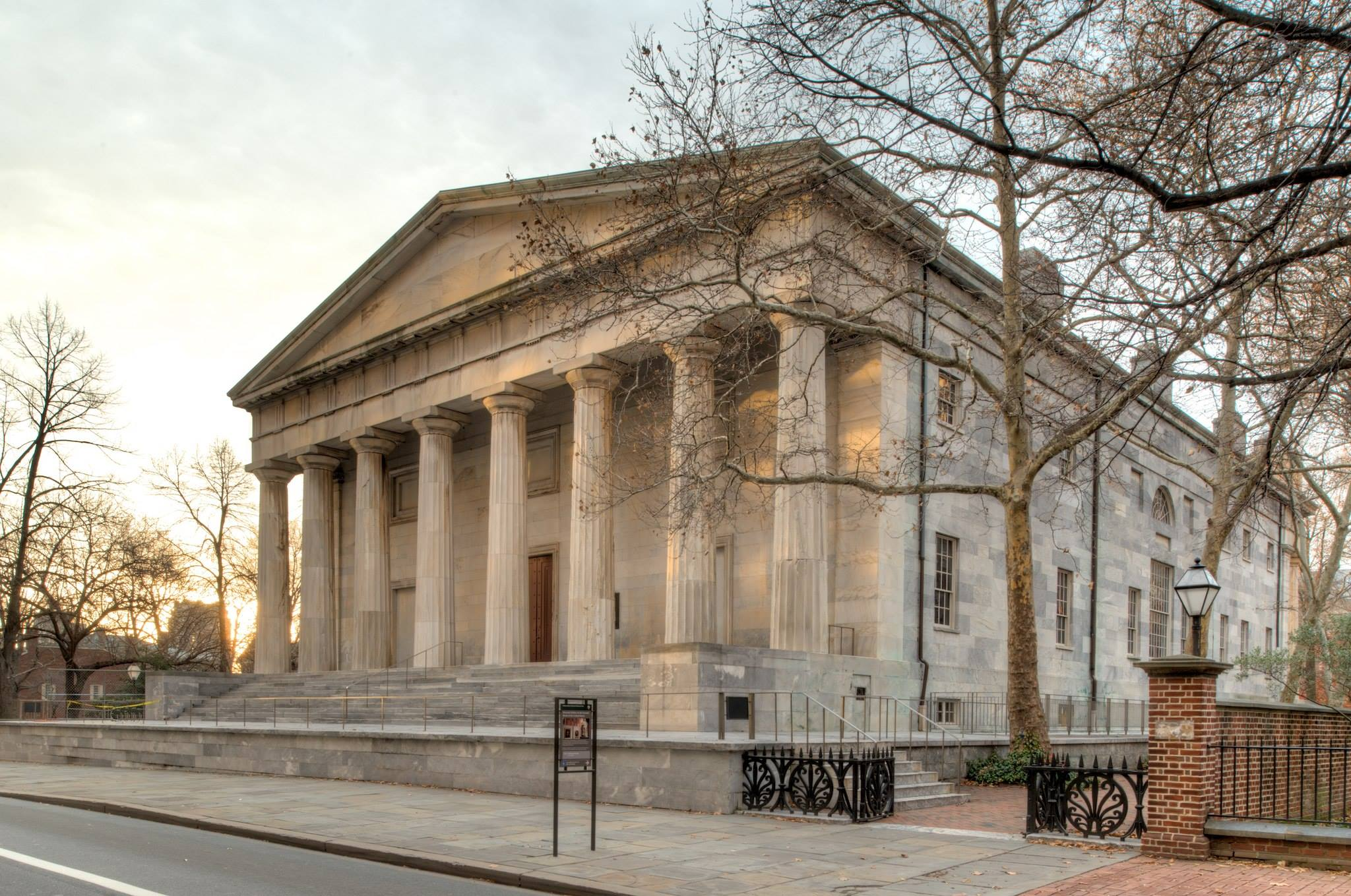
- Second Bank of the United States building Philadelphia
- Date: December 6, 1831
- Venue: House Chamber, United States Capitol
- Location: Washington, D.C.; 38°53′23″N 77°00′32″W
- Type: State of the Union Address
- Participants: Andrew Jackson; John C. Calhoun; Andrew Stevenson
- Format: Written
- Previous: 1830 State of the Union Address
- Next: 1832 State of the Union Address

The 1831 State of the Union Address was delivered by the seventh president of the United States, Andrew Jackson, on December 6, 1831, to the 22nd United States Congress. In his third annual message, Jackson highlighted the continued prosperity of the United States, focusing on agricultural success, growth in manufacturing, and advancements in internal improvements. He credited these developments to the nation's free institutions and stressed the importance of maintaining the Union.

Jackson noted that the nation was thriving in trade and commerce, with shipyards full of activity and American vessels trading across the globe. He also pointed to the rapid development of railroads and steam power, predicting that these technologies would soon bridge the vast distances within the United States, alleviating concerns about the Union's size threatening its stability.

In foreign affairs, Jackson celebrated the successful negotiation of a treaty with France, which resolved longstanding claims of indemnity for American citizens whose ships were seized during the Napoleonic Wars. This treaty, Jackson asserted, would remove a significant source of tension between the two nations. He also reported progress on claims with other European nations, including Great Britain and Spain, and emphasized the importance of maintaining friendly and equitable relations with all foreign powers.

One of the key domestic issues addressed in the speech was the ongoing policy of Indian Removal. Jackson noted that treaties with the Chickasaw and Choctaw nations were being executed, leading to their removal west of the Mississippi River. He expressed hope that the Cherokee would soon follow suit, allowing for the complete settlement of Mississippi and Alabama by white settlers. Jackson framed this policy as both beneficial to the states and to the Native Americans, who he claimed would be better off away from the encroachment of white settlers.

Jackson also touched on the federal budget, noting the government's strong financial position, with revenue exceeding expectations and allowing for substantial payments toward the national debt. He reiterated his support for a reduction in import duties once the debt was fully paid, advocating for a tariff that would protect American industries without placing undue burdens on consumers.

Finally, Jackson restated his concerns about the Second Bank of the United States, leaving the issue to Congress and the people for further consideration, but reaffirming his opposition to the institution in its current form.

Andrew Jackson did not attend the November 24, 1831 Philadelphia wedding of Andrew Jackson Jr. and Sarah Yorke because he was consumed with preparing his annual message.

Preceded by 1830 State of the Union Address	State of the Union addresses 1831	Succeeded by 1832 State of the Union Address
