= 1836 State of the Union Address =

Speech by US President Andrew Jackson

- Date: December 5, 1836
- Venue: House Chamber, United States Capitol
- Location: Washington, D.C.; 38°53′23″N 77°00′32″W
- Type: State of the Union Address
- Participants: Andrew Jackson; Martin Van Buren; James K. Polk
- Format: Written
- Previous: 1835 State of the Union Address
- Next: 1837 State of the Union Address

The 1836 State of the Union Address was given by Andrew Jackson, the seventh president of the United States, on December 5, 1836. He did not personally deliver the address to the 24th United States Congress, but a clerk did. He concluded it with, "All that has occurred during my Administration is calculated to inspire me with increased confidence in the stability of our institutions; and should I be spared to enter upon that retirement which is so suitable to my age and infirm health and so much desired by me in other respects, I shall not cease to invoke that beneficent Being to whose providence we are already so signally indebted for the continuance of His blessings on our beloved country."

Notably, the President wrote that he supported the incorporation of Texas into the Union by saying, "The known desire of the Texans to become a part of our system, although its gratification depends upon the reconcilement of various and conflicting interests, necessarily a work of time and uncertain in itself, is calculated to expose our conduct to misconstruction in the eyes of the world."

Additionally, the President commented on the status of the Seminole War by saying:

The war with the Seminoles during the summer was on our part chiefly confined to the protection of our frontier settlements from the incursions of the enemy, and, as a necessary and important means for the accomplishment of that end, to the maintenance of the posts previously established. In the course of this duty several actions took place, in which the bravery and discipline of both officers and men were conspicuously displayed, and which I have deemed it proper to notice in respect to the former by the granting of brevet rank for gallant services in the field. But as the force of the Indians was not so far weakened by these partial successes as to lead them to submit, and as their savage inroads were frequently repeated, early measures were taken for placing at the disposal of Governor Call, who as commander in chief of the Territorial militia had been temporarily invested with the command, an ample force for the purpose of resuming offensive operations in the most efficient manner so soon as the season should permit. Major General Jesup was also directed, on the conclusion of his duties in the Creek country, to repair to Florida and assume the command.

Preceded by 1835 State of the Union Address	State of the Union addresses 1836	Succeeded by 1837 State of the Union Address
