= Indian Removal Act =

Law authorizing the removal of Native Americans from US states

- Long title: An Act to provide for an exchange of lands with the Indians residing in any of the states or territories, and for their removal west of the river Mississippi.
- Enacted by: the 21st United States Congress

Citations
- Public law: Pub. L. 21–148
- Statutes at Large: 4 Stat. 411

Legislative history
- Introduced in the Senate as S. 102; Passed the Senate on April 24, 1830 (28–19); Passed the House on May 26, 1830 (101–97); Signed into law by President Andrew Jackson on May 28, 1830

The Indian Removal Act of 1830 was signed into law on May 28, 1830, by United States president Andrew Jackson. The law, as described by Congress, provided "for an exchange of lands with the Indians residing in any of the states or territories, and for their removal west of the river Mississippi". (Note: The U.S. Senate passed the bill on April 24, 1830 (28–19), and the U.S. House passed it on May 26, 1830 (102–97).) During the presidency of Jackson (1829‍–‍1837) and his successor Martin Van Buren (1837‍–‍1841), more than 60,000 American Indians from at least 18 tribes were forced to move west of the Mississippi River where they were allocated new lands. The southern Indian tribes were resettled mostly into what became the Indian Territory (Oklahoma). The northern Indian tribes were resettled initially in Kansas. With a few exceptions, the United States east of the Mississippi and south of the Great Lakes was emptied of its American Indian population. The movement westward of Indian tribes was characterized by a large number of deaths due to the hardships of the journey.

The U.S. Congress approved the Act by a narrow majority in the United States House of Representatives. The Indian Removal Act was supported by President Jackson and the Democratic Party, southern politicians and white settlers, and several state governments, especially that of Georgia. The Indian tribes and the Whig Party however opposed the bill, as did other groups within American society (e.g., some white Christian missionaries and clergymen).[citation needed] Legal efforts to allow Indian tribes to remain on their land in the eastern U.S. failed. Most famously, the Cherokee (excluding the Treaty Party) challenged their relocation, but were unsuccessful in the courts; they were forcibly removed by the United States government in a march to the west which later became known as the Trail of Tears. Since the 21st century, scholars have cited the act and subsequent removals as an early example of state-sanctioned ethnic cleansing or genocide or settler colonialism; some view it as all three.

== Background ==
=== History of European cultural assimilation in the New World ===
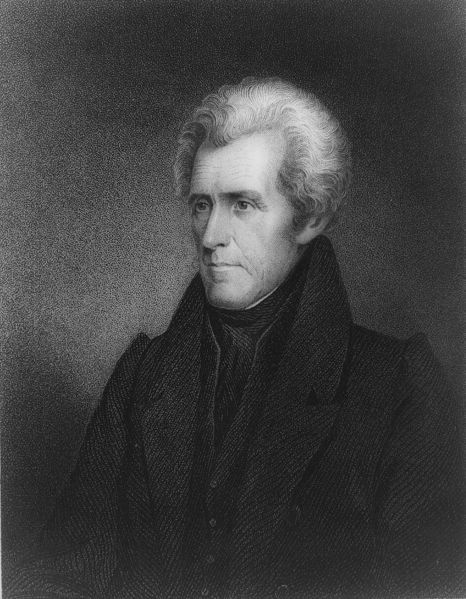
President Andrew Jackson called for an Indian Removal Act in his first (1829) State of the Union address.

Many European colonists saw American Indian tribes as savages. However, Euro-Indian relations varied, particularly between the French and British colonies. New France, which was established in the Great Lakes region, generally pursued a cooperative relationship with the Indian tribes, through the existence of certain traditions such as the marriage à la façon du pays, a marriage between French-Canadian tradesmen (coureur des bois) and American Indian women. This tradition was seen as a fundamental social and political institution that helped maintain relations and bond the two cultures. Many of the missionaries are known to have taught the tribes how to use iron tools, build European-style homes, and improve farming techniques; the teachings of the Wyandot, who maintained a century long friendship with French Canadians, would spread on to other tribes as they relocated to the Maumee River. Throughout the 17th and 18th century during the Beaver and French and Indian Wars, the greatest number of tribes—and the most powerful—tended to side with the French, though other tribes such as the Iroquois supported the British for various strategic reasons. For strategic economic and military purposes, the French had a practice of building forts and trading posts within tribal villages, such as that of Fort Miami in Indiana within the Miami village of Kekionga. However, the belief in European cultural, religious and technological superiority was generally widespread among high ranking European colonial officials and clergymen in this period.

During the colonial and right after the independent history of the United States, many European colonists and their American descendants felt their civilization to be superior to that of the American Indian people they encountered due to their own notions of private property as a superior system of land tenure in addition to their Christian faith practices. White settler Colonial and frontier encroachers inflicted a practice of cultural assimilation, meaning that tribes such as the Cherokee were forced to adopt aspects of white civilization. This American acculturation was originally proposed by first President George Washington, and it was well underway among the Cherokee and the Choctaw people by the beginning of the 19th century. Indian tribes were encouraged to adopt European American customs. First, they were forced to convert to Christianity and abandon their traditional religious practices. They were required to learn to speak and read English, although there was interest in creating a writing and printing system for a few American Indian languages, especially Cherokee, exemplified by Sequoyah's Cherokee syllabary. The American Indians also had to adopt white settler values, such as monogamous marriage and abandon the idea of non-marital sex. Finally, they had to accept the concept of individual ownership of land and other property (including, in some instances, the ownership of black African people as slaves). Many Cherokee people adopted all, or some, of these practices, including Cherokee chief John Ross, John Ridge, and Elias Boudinot, as represented by the newspaper he edited, the Cherokee Phoenix.

=== Perceived failure of the policy ===
Despite the adoption of white western cultural values by many Indian tribes, the United States government began a systematic effort to remove American Indian peoples from the American Southeast. The Chickasaw, Choctaw, Muscogee-Creek, Seminole, and original Cherokee nations (Note: These distinct ethnic and political groups were referred to in the United States as the "Five Civilized Tribes".) had been established as autonomous nations in the southeastern United States.

Andrew Jackson sought to renew a policy of political and military action for the removal of American Indians from these lands and worked toward enacting a law for "Indian removal". In the 1829 State of the Union Address, Jackson called for Indian removal.

The Indian Removal Act was put in place to annex American Indian land and then transfer that ownership to Southern US states, such as Georgia. The Act was passed in 1830, although dialogue had been ongoing since 1802 between Georgia and the federal government concerning the possibility of such an act. Ethan Davis states that "the federal government had promised Georgia that it would extinguish Indian title within the state's borders by purchase 'as soon as the such purchase could be made upon reasonable terms'". As time passed, Southern states began to speed up the expulsions by claiming that the deal between Georgia and the federal government was invalid and that Southern states could pass laws extinguishing Indian title themselves. In response, the federal government passed the Indian Removal Act on May 28, 1830, in which President Jackson agreed to divide the United States territory west of the Mississippi River into districts for tribes to replace the land from which they were removed.

In the 1823 case of Johnson v. McIntosh, the United States Supreme Court handed down a decision stating that Indians could occupy and control lands within the United States but could not hold title to those lands. Jackson viewed the union as a federation of highly esteemed states, as was common before the American Civil War. He opposed Washington's policy of establishing treaties with Indian tribes as if they were sovereign foreign nations. Thus, the creation of Indian jurisdictions was a violation of state sovereignty under Article IV, Section 3 of the Constitution. As Jackson saw it, either Indians comprised sovereign states (which violated the Constitution) or were subject to the laws of existing states of the Union. Jackson urged Indians to assimilate and obey state laws. Further, he believed he could only accommodate the desire for American Indian self-rule in federal US territories, which required resettlement on Federal lands west of the Mississippi River.

== Support and opposition ==
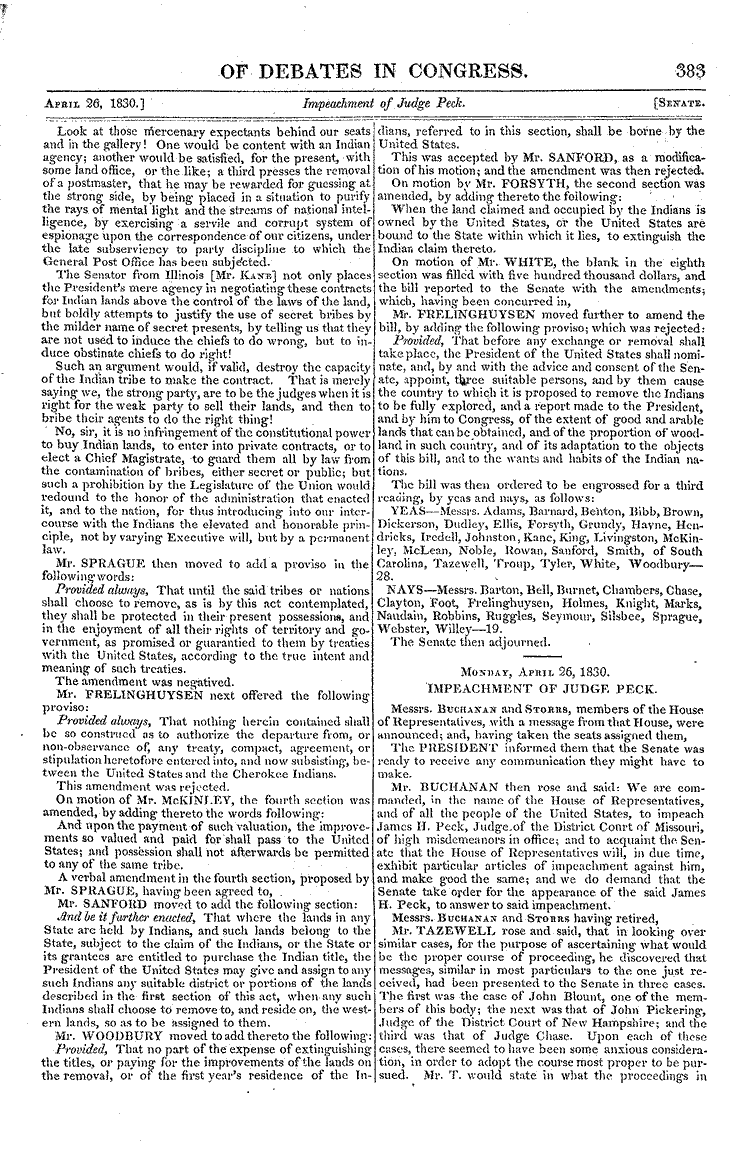
Congressional debates concerning the Indian Removal Act, April 1830

The Removal Act was strongly supported in the American South, especially in Georgia, which was involved in a jurisdictional dispute with the Cherokee and was the largest state in 1802. President Jackson hoped that removal would resolve the Georgia crisis. Besides the Five Civilized Tribes, additional people affected included the Wyandot, the Kickapoo, the Potawatomi, the Shawnee, and the Lenape.

The Indian Removal Act was controversial. Many Americans during this time favored its passage, but there was also significant opposition. Many white Christian missionaries protested against it, most notably missionary organizer Jeremiah Evarts. In U.S. Congress, New Jersey Senator Theodore Frelinghuysen, Kentucky Senator Henry Clay, and Tennessee Congressman Davy Crockett spoke out against the legislation. The Removal Act passed only after a bitter debate in Congress. Clay extensively campaigned against it on the National Republican Party ticket in the 1832 United States presidential election.

Jackson viewed the demise of Native nations as inevitable, pointing to the steady expansion of European-based lifestyles and the decimation of Native nations in the U.S.'s northeast region. He called his Northern critics hypocrites, given the North's history regarding Native nations within their claimed territory. Jackson stated that "progress requires moving forward."

Humanity has often wept over the fate of the aborigines of this country and philanthropy has long been busily employed in devising means to avert it, but its progress never has for a moment been arrested, and one by one have many powerful tribes disappeared from the earth... But true philanthropy reconciles the mind to these vicissitudes as it does to the extinction of one generation to make room for another... In the monuments and fortresses of an unknown people, spread over the extensive regions of the West, we behold the memorials of a once powerful race, which was exterminated or has disappeared to make room for the existing savage tribes… Philanthropy could not wish to see this continent restored to the condition in which it was found by our forefathers. What good man would prefer a country covered with forests and ranged by a few thousand savages to our extensive Republic, studded with cities, towns, and prosperous farms, embellished with all the improvements which art can devise or industry execute, occupied by more than 12,000,000 happy people, and filled with all the blessings of liberty, civilization, and religion?

According to historian H. W. Brands, Jackson sincerely believed that his population transfer was a "wise and humane policy" that would save the Native Americans from "utter annihilation". Jackson portrayed the removal as a paternalistic act of mercy.

According to Robert M. Keeton, those in favor of the bill would use biblical stories, including the Story of Creation and the Story of Jacob and Esau, to argue for the resettlement of Native Americans. This method was used by figures such as Wilson Lumpkin, Richard H. Wilde, and Andrew Jackson to justify the act from a righteous standpoint.

== Vote ==
On April 24, 1830, the Senate passed the Indian Removal Act by a vote of 28 to 19. On May 26, 1830, the House of Representatives passed the Act by a vote of 101 to 97. On May 28, 1830, the Indian Removal Act was signed into law by President Andrew Jackson.

Worcester v. Georgia

A legal case that took place in 1832 by the United States Supreme Court which held a final vote (5‍–‍1) affirming that the states did not have the right to impose regulations on Native American Land. Despite President Andrew Jackson's refusal to enforce the ruling, this ultimate decision led the formation basis for the subsequent law in the United States in regard to Native Americans.

Worcester v. Georgia involved a group of white Christian missionaries who were living in the Cherokee territory in Georgia, this included Cherokee messenger, Samuel Austin Worcester.

== Implementation ==
The Removal Act paved the way for the forced expulsion of tens of thousands of American Indians from the Cherokee tribe in 1838-39 into the West in an event widely known as the "Trail of Tears", a forced resettlement of the Indian population. This event has been characterized as a genocide. The first removal treaty signed was the Treaty of Dancing Rabbit Creek on September 27, 1830, in which Choctaws in Mississippi ceded land east of the river in exchange for payment and land in the West. The Treaty of New Echota was signed in 1835 and resulted in the removal of the Cherokee on the Trail of Tears.

The Seminoles and other tribes did not leave peacefully, as they resisted the removal along with fugitive slaves. The Second Seminole War lasted from 1835 to 1842 and resulted in the government allowing them to remain in south Florida swampland. Only a small number remained, and around 3,000 were removed in the war.

== Legacy ==
In the 21st century, scholars have cited the act and subsequent removals as an early example of state sanctioned ethnic cleansing or genocide or settler colonialism or as all three forms of these. Historian Richard White wrote that because of "claimed parallels between ethnic cleansing and Indian removal, any examination of Indian removal will inevitably involve discussions of ethnic cleansing." Other scholarship has focused on the historical comparisons between the United States concept of manifest destiny and Nazi Germany's concept of Lebensraum and how American Indian removal policy served as a model for Nazi racial policy during the Generalplan Ost plan.

An alternative view posits that the Indian Removal Act, despite the deaths and forced relocation, benefitted the removed peoples by saving their societies from a worse fate that likely awaited them were they to remain in their home territories to face a mass influx of settlers that the federal government was unable to prevent. As Robert V. Remini stated:

Jackson genuinely believed that what he had accomplished rescued these people from inevitable annihilation. And although that statement sounds monstrous, and although no one in the modern world wishes to accept or believe it, that is exactly what he did. He saved the Five Civilized Nations from probable extinction.

Similarly, historian Francis Paul Prucha argued that removal was the best of the four options that presented themselves, the other three being genocide, assimilation into white culture, and protection of tribal lands against settler encroachment, the last of which Prucha, like Remini, saw as unachievable.
