= 1838 State of the Union Address =

Speech by US President Martin Van Buren

- Date: December 3, 1838
- Venue: House Chamber, United States Capitol
- Location: Washington, D.C.; 38°53′23″N 77°00′32″W
- Type: State of the Union Address
- Participants: Martin Van Buren; Richard Mentor Johnson; James K. Polk
- Format: Written
- Previous: 1837 State of the Union Address
- Next: 1839 State of the Union Address

The 1838 State of the Union Address was delivered by the eighth president of the United States Martin Van Buren to the 25th United States Congress on December 3, 1838. Van Buren presented an optimistic view of the nation's state, reflecting on fifty years of federal governance under the U.S. Constitution, which he described as a system preserving both "individual happiness" and "private interests." This year marked the nation’s half-century under the framework devised by the Founding Fathers, which Van Buren credited for the preservation of peace, liberty, and economic growth.

Van Buren reflected on the United States’ significant advancements in education, religious freedom, and infrastructure development. He highlighted how the Constitution allowed for expansion westward while balancing the unique cultural and social attributes of the many new communities. Van Buren noted, “Each successive change made in our local institutions...has increased the direct influence of the mass of the community,” underscoring how democratic practices had grown to serve the broader population.

The speech also covered key foreign policy issues. Relations with Mexico were stabilizing through a new treaty that aimed to arbitrate longstanding disputes. Van Buren reported progress toward settling boundary disputes with Great Britain over the northeastern U.S. border. Furthermore, he addressed concerns over unauthorized expeditions by American citizens into Canada during times of unrest, vowing the government would "repress all attempts" by Americans to interfere in Canadian affairs.

On domestic matters, Van Buren focused on economic recovery following the Panic of 1837, mentioning efforts to stabilize the currency and the resumption of specie (gold and silver) payments. He acknowledged that the federal treasury had stabilized and attributed this in part to the return to specie-backed currency: "The short duration of [the suspension of specie payments]...proves how little our finances require such an institution" as a national bank.

The president also discussed progress in Indian removal efforts, noting the complete relocation of the Cherokee Nation and the near-total resettlement of other tribes, such as the Choctaw and Creek. Van Buren highlighted the challenges posed by the Seminole Wars, stressing continued efforts to remove Seminole forces resisting relocation in Florida. He contended that this longstanding federal policy was intended to support "civilization" and independence for the tribes in newly designated lands west of the Mississippi River.

Preceded by 1837 State of the Union Address	State of the Union addresses 1838	Succeeded by 1839 State of the Union Address
