= Inauguration of Martin Van Buren =

13th United States presidential inauguration

Presidential inauguration of Martin Van Buren
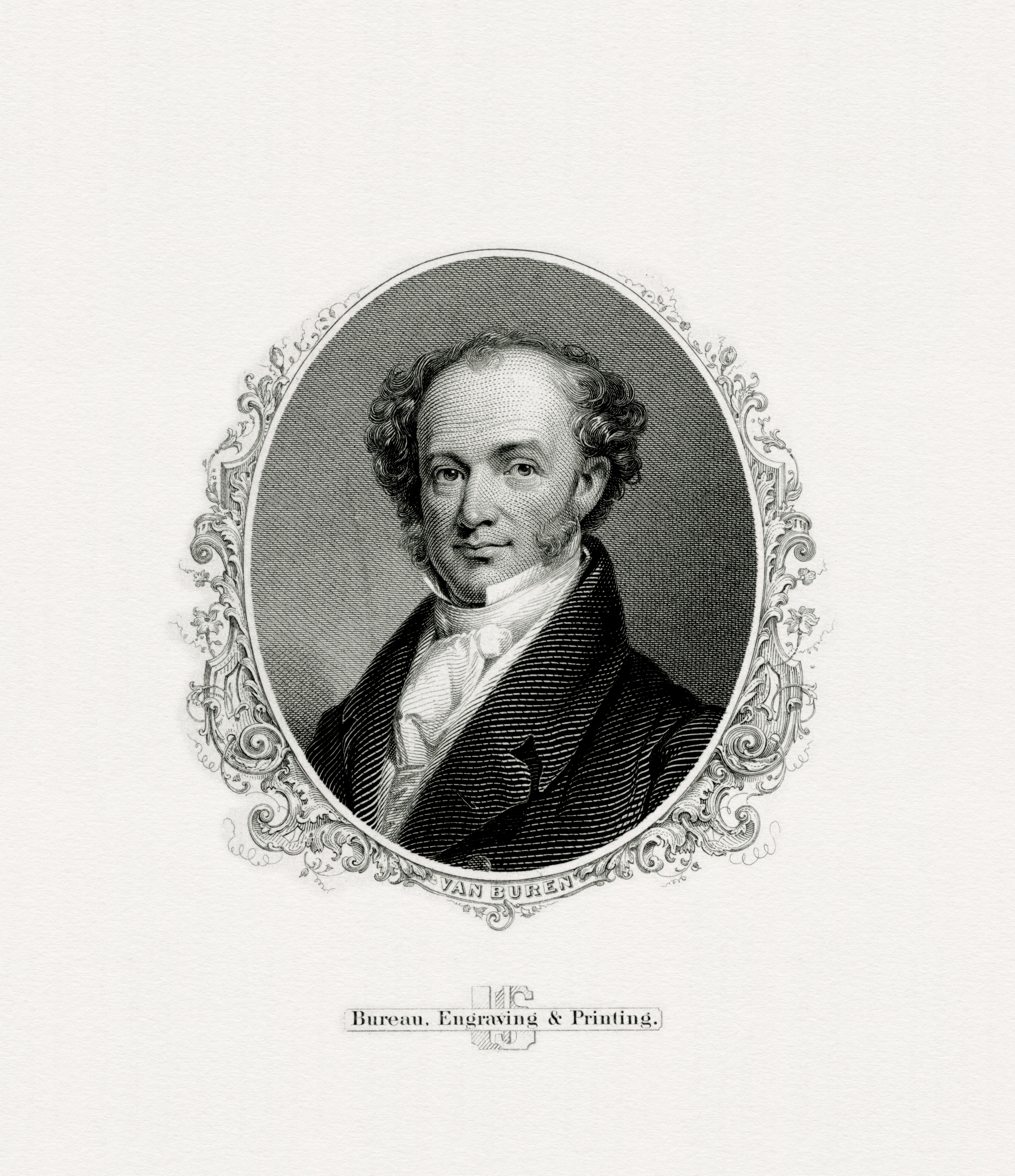
- Martin Van Buren
- Date: March 4, 1837; 189 years ago
- Location: United States Capitol, Washington, D.C.
- Participants: Martin Van Buren; 8th president of the United States — Assuming office Roger B. Taney; Chief Justice of the United States — Administering oath Richard Mentor Johnson; 9th vice president of the United States — Assuming office William R. King; President pro tempore of the United States Senate — Administering oath

The inauguration of Martin Van Buren as the eighth president of the United States took place on Saturday, March 4, 1837, at the East Portico of the United States Capitol in Washington, D.C. This was the 13th inauguration and marked the commencement of the only four-year term of both Martin Van Buren as president and Richard Mentor Johnson as vice president. Vice President and President-elect Van Buren rode with his predecessor Andrew Jackson in a small phaeton built from the wood of the USS Constitution drawn by four gray horses. This was the first time that the outgoing and incoming president rode together to the Capitol. Van Buren would become the last sitting vice president to be inaugurated as president through an election until George H. W. Bush in 1989.

The event proved less a celebration of the incoming president than a tribute to the outgoing one. Van Buren's inaugural address took wistful note of it:

In receiving from the people the sacred trust twice confided to my illustrious predecessor, and which he has discharged so faithfully and so well, I know that I can not expect to perform the arduous task with equal ability and success. But ... I may hope that somewhat of the same cheering approbation will be found to attend upon my path.

The scene as former President Jackson departed the Capitol was described in The Age of Jackson:

After the inaugural address the old General started slowly down the broad steps toward the carriage below. As he descended the people yielded to their feelings; the pent-up flood of cheers and shouts broke forth; and they paid their long, last, irresistible tribute to the man they loved... Thomas Hart Benton, watching from a side window, felt himself stirred as never before. In later years he would recall many inaugurations, but compared to this day they all seemed as pageants, "empty and soulless, brief to the view, unreal to the touch, and soon to vanish." This was reality, the living relation between a man and his people, distilled for a pause in the rhythm of events, rising for a moment of wild and soaring enthusiasm, then dying away into the chambers of memory.

With a single exception, the new administration retained Jackson's entire cabinet, and Van Buren pledged to "tread generally in the footsteps of President Jackson."

== See also ==
- Presidency of Martin Van Buren
- 1836 United States presidential election
