= 1829 State of the Union Address =

Speech by US President Andrew Jackson

- Date: December 8, 1829
- Venue: House Chamber, United States Capitol
- Location: Washington, D.C.; 38°53′23″N 77°00′32″W
- Type: State of the Union Address
- Participants: Andrew Jackson; John C. Calhoun; Andrew Stevenson
- Format: Written
- Previous: 1828 State of the Union Address
- Next: 1830 State of the Union Address

The 1829 State of the Union Address was delivered by the seventh president of the United States, Andrew Jackson, on December 8, 1829, to the 21st United States Congress. This was Jackson's first address to Congress after his election, and it set the tone for his presidency, emphasizing limited government, states’ rights, and the removal of Native Americans from their lands.

== Economic and foreign affairs ==
In his address, Jackson expressed satisfaction with the nation's peace and prosperity, noting that the country was “at peace with all mankind” and that domestic affairs were progressing well. He acknowledged, however, unresolved disputes with foreign powers, particularly Great Britain, France, and Spain. Jackson assured Congress that his administration would work to settle these differences amicably, while maintaining a firm stance on protecting American rights.

A significant part of the address was dedicated to internal improvements and the national debt. Jackson called for a cautious approach to government spending, warning against the dangers of corruption and advocating for reducing the national debt. “It is time to check the tendency to lavish expenditure and make our government as simple and economical as possible,” Jackson urged.

== Election reform ==
Jackson also called for a constitutional amendment to reform the presidential election process. He suggested eliminating the role of electoral colleges and the House of Representatives in selecting the president, advocating for a direct popular vote to ensure that the will of the people would always prevail in presidential elections.

== Call for removal of Native American tribes ==
The address is also notable for Jackson's call to remove Native American tribes from their ancestral lands in the southern states. Jackson argued that their removal to territories west of the Mississippi River was necessary to protect their survival and to avoid conflict with state governments. He stated, "Humanity and national honor demand that every effort should be made to avert so great a calamity," referring to the potential extinction of Native tribes. His statement also "rejected the authority of the southern tribes to establish independent governments within the several states, arguing that they had possessory rights only and must emigrate west or submit to the laws of the state in which they resided."

== Legacy ==
Jackson's first State of the Union address marked the beginning of the major policies of his administration, including limited federal intervention, states' rights, and Native American removal, setting the stage for his presidency.

Preceded by 1828 State of the Union Address	State of the Union addresses 1829	Succeeded by 1830 State of the Union Address
