= Inauguration of Thomas Jefferson =

Inauguration of Thomas Jefferson may refer to:

- First inauguration of Thomas Jefferson, 1801
- Second inauguration of Thomas Jefferson, 1805
- Inauguration of John Adams, in which he inaugurated as vice president in 1797

== See also ==
- The full text of Thomas Jefferson's First Inaugural Address at Wikisource
- The full text of Thomas Jefferson's Second Inaugural Address at Wikisource
