= First inauguration of Ulysses S. Grant =

21st United States presidential inauguration

First presidential inauguration of Ulysses S. Grant
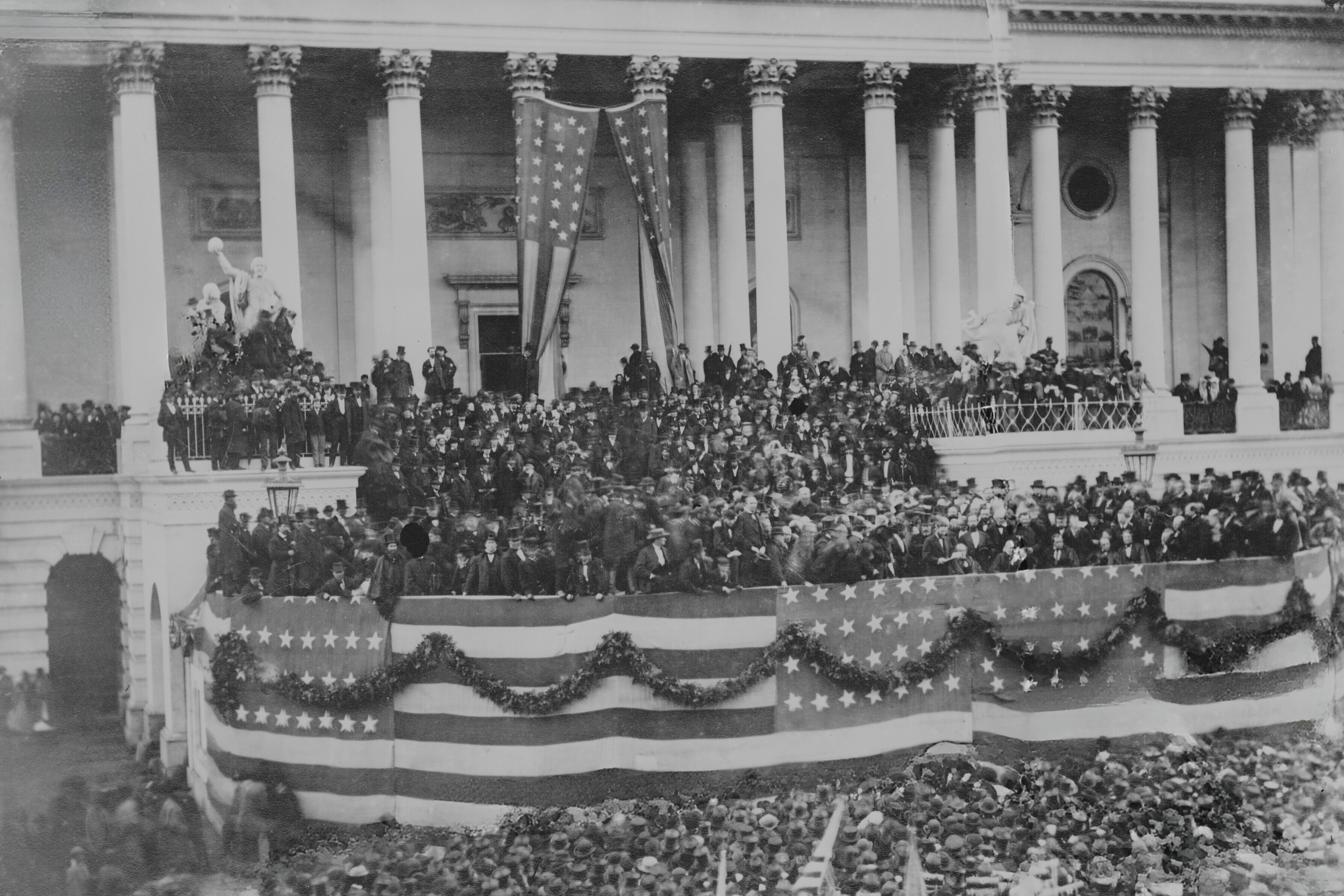
- Grant delivering his first inaugural address at the United States Capitol, March 4, 1869.
- Date: March 4, 1869; 157 years ago
- Location: United States Capitol, Washington, D.C.
- Participants: Ulysses S. Grant; 18th president of the United States — Assuming office Salmon P. Chase; Chief Justice of the United States — Administering oath Schuyler Colfax; 17th vice president of the United States — Assuming office Benjamin Wade; President pro tempore of the United States Senate — Administering oath

The first inauguration of Ulysses S. Grant as the 18th president of the United States was held on March 4, 1869, at the East Portico of the United States Capitol in Washington, D.C. This was the 21st presidential inauguration and marked the commencement of the first four-year term of Ulysses S. Grant as president and the only term of Schuyler Colfax as vice president. Chief Justice Salmon P. Chase administered the presidential oath of office. Outgoing president Andrew Johnson did not attend the inaugural ceremonies, as he and Grant refused to sit with each other in the carriage going to them. Johnson also refused to go in a separate carriage. Instead, he was in the White House signing last-minute legislation. This was the third time an outgoing president boycotted his elected successor's inauguration. (Note: The previous two were John Adams in 1801 and John Quincy Adams in 1829. This would not happen again until Donald Trump in 2021. Martin Van Buren (in 1841) and Woodrow Wilson (in 1921) were absent for other reasons (Van Buren's ill son and political rancor; Wilson was ill).)

Grant's 1869 inaugural parade was grander than any of those before him: special tickets were required for admission to the Capitol on inauguration day, eight full divisions of soldiers marched down Pennsylvania Avenue, and windows overlooking the parade route sold for very high prices. That evening, a ball was held in the Treasury Building.

== Grant's inaugural address ==
There are three main points that President Grant put forward in his Inauguration Address, which he had entirely written on his own. Grant started off his Inauguration Address by discussing how the laws should be enforced and what an ideal executive branch should look like,

On all leading questions agitating the public mind I will always express my views to Congress and urge them according to my judgment, and when I think it advisable will exercise the constitutional privilege of interposing a veto to defeat measures which I oppose; but all laws will be faithfully executed, whether they meet my approval or not.

I shall on all subjects have a policy to recommend, but none to enforce against the will of the people. Laws are to govern all alike--those opposed as well as those who favor them. I know no method to secure the repeal of bad or obnoxious laws so effective as their stringent execution.

Grant then went into the Civil War and reassured the American citizens that he would fight to retire the debt from the war.

A great debt has been contracted in securing to us and our posterity the Union. The payment of this, principal and interest, as well as the return to a specie basis as soon as it can be accomplished without material detriment to the debtor class or to the country at large, must be provided for. To protect the national honor, every dollar of Government indebtedness should be paid in gold, unless otherwise expressly stipulated in the contract. Let it be understood that no repudiator of one farthing of our public debt will be trusted in public place, and it will go far toward strengthening a credit which ought to be the best in the world, and will ultimately enable us to replace the debt with bonds bearing less interest than we now pay. To this should be added a faithful collection of the revenue, a strict accountability to the Treasury for every dollar collected, and the greatest practicable retrenchment in expenditure in every department of Government.

Lastly, Grant fully endorsed the Fifteenth Amendment, which was ratified in 1870, granting African Americans suffrage rights.

The question of suffrage is one which is likely to agitate the public so long as a portion of the citizens of the nation are excluded from its privileges in any State. It seems to me very desirable that this question should be settled now, and I entertain the hope and express the desire that it may be by the ratification of the fifteenth article of amendment to the Constitution."

== Reactions to the inaugural address ==
Grant's inaugural address was well received by the American press and citizens. The address was recognized to be "brief, clear, emphatic, and to the purpose." The American public gained faith in Grant's administration as they believed that Grant had a full sense of responsibilities, but without misunderstanding or fear of what was in front of him.

== European congratulatory telegrams ==
When Grant reached his headquarters after the inauguration, the following table telegrams were placed in his hands.

Berlin, March 4th.

President Gen. Grant, White House, Washington, D.C.:

My cordial congratulations on this solemn day.

— (Signed) BISMARCK

To President Grant, Washington: In honor of the man and the day, three cheers for the president.

— Members of the Berlin Exchange, FRITZ MAYER

== Inauguration observances in other cities ==
Following are some inauguration observances published in other American cities, more can be found through the link in the footnotes.

=== Indianapolis, March 4 ===
"A prayer meeting, under the auspices of the Young Men's Christian Association, was held at Masonic Hall to-day from 12 to 1 o'clock, invoking Divine blessings on the incoming Administration, all Christian denominations uniting."

=== San Francisco, March 4 ===
"A salute was fired and the public buildings and the principal streets of the city were decorated with flags to-day, in honor of the inauguration of GRANT."

=== Nashville, March 4 ===
"Grant's Inaugural address was circulated here at 3:30 pm today. It was sought for and read with avidity to suffrage is regarded as obscure; otherwise the address gives general satisfaction."

== Gallery ==
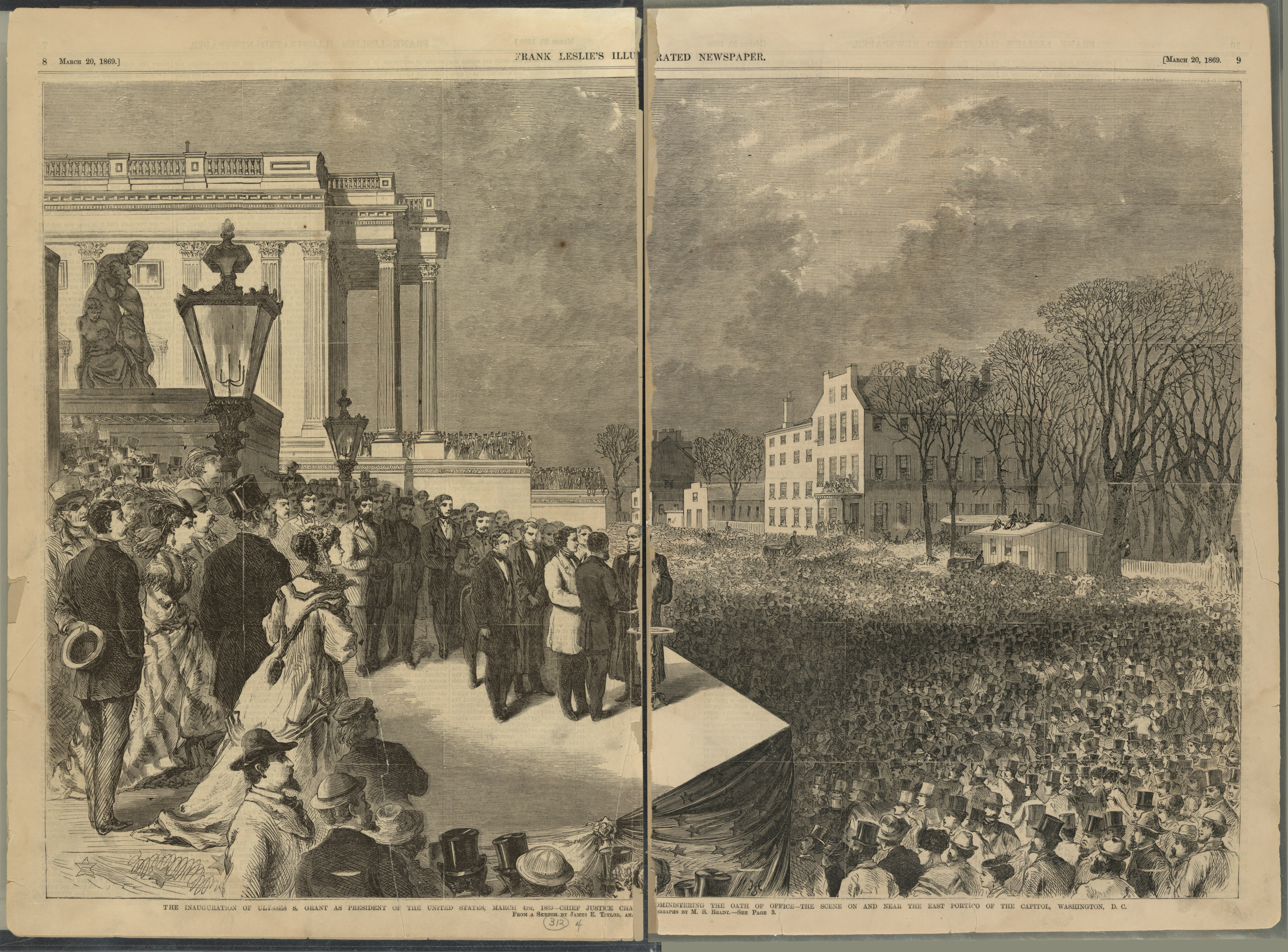
The inauguration of Ulysses S. Grant as president of the United States, March 4th, 1869 - Chief Justice Chase administering the oath of office - the scene on and near the east portico of the Capitol, Washington, D.C

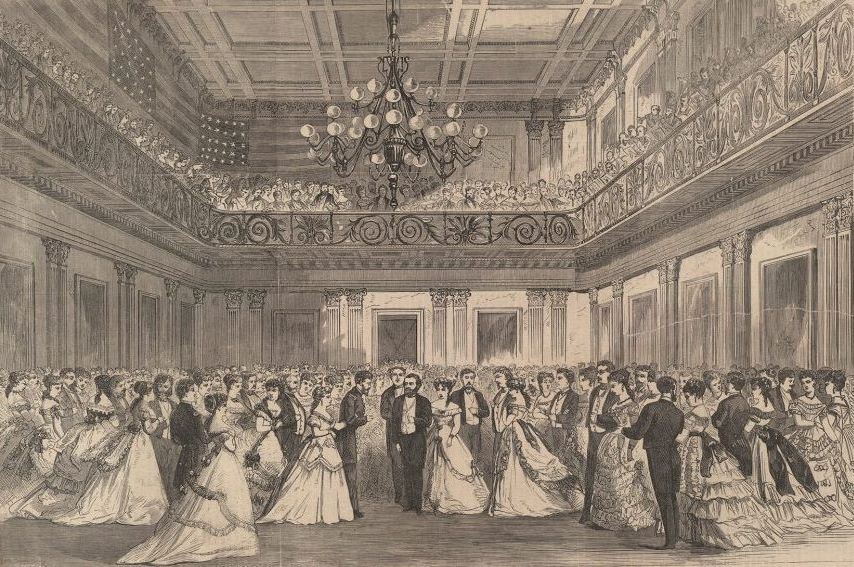
The inaugural ball for president Ulysses S. Grant held in the Cash Room of the Department of Treasury in Washington DC, 20th March 1869

== See also ==
- Presidency of Ulysses S. Grant
- Second inauguration of Ulysses S. Grant
- 1868 United States presidential election
