= Inauguration of Andrew Jackson =

Inauguration of Andrew Jackson may refer to:

- First inauguration of Andrew Jackson, 1829
- Second inauguration of Andrew Jackson, 1833

== See also ==
- The full text of Andrew Jackson's First Inaugural Address at Wikisource
- The full text of Andrew Jackson's Second Inaugural Address at Wikisource
