= United States presidential inauguration =

Ceremony marking the start of a new presidential term

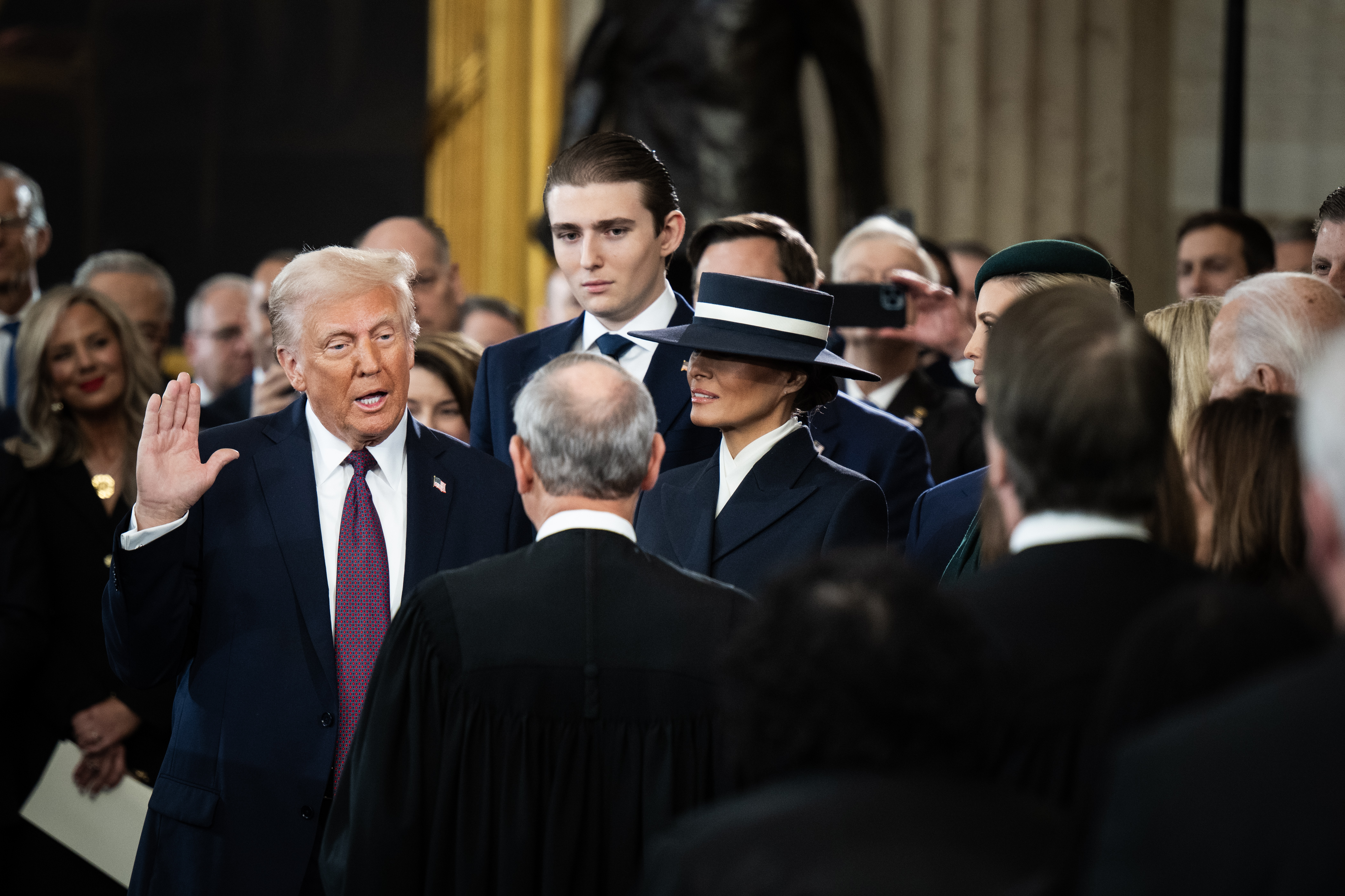
Second inauguration of Donald Trump, January 20, 2025, in the United States Capitol rotunda

Between seventy-three and seventy-nine days after the presidential election, the president-elect of the United States is inaugurated as president by taking the presidential oath of office. The inauguration takes place for each new presidential term, even if the president is continuing in office for another term.

The first inauguration of George Washington took place on April 30, 1789. Subsequent public inaugurations from 1793 until 1933 were held on March 4, with the exceptions of those in 1821, 1849, 1877, and 1917, when March 4 fell on a Sunday, thus the public inauguration ceremony took place on Monday, March 5. Since 1937, it has taken place at noon Eastern time on January 20, the first day of the new term, except in 1957, 1985, and 2013, when January 20 fell on a Sunday. In those years, the presidential oath of office was administered on that day privately and then again in a public ceremony the next day, on Monday, January 21. The most recent presidential inauguration was held on January 20, 2025, when Donald Trump reassumed office.

Recitation of the presidential oath of office is the only component in this ceremony mandated by the United States Constitution (in Article II, Section One, Clause 8). Though it is not a constitutional requirement, the chief justice of the United States typically administers the presidential oath of office. Since 1789, the oath has been administered at sixty scheduled public inaugurations, by fifteen chief justices, one associate justice, and one New York state judge. Others, in addition to the chief justice, have administered the oath of office to several of the nine vice presidents who have succeeded to the presidency upon their predecessor's death or resignation intra-term.

Since the 1981 inauguration of Ronald Reagan, the ceremony has been held at the west front of the United States Capitol facing the National Mall with its iconic Washington Monument and distant Lincoln Memorial. From 1829 through 1977, most swearing-in ceremonies had taken place on a platform over the steps at the Capitol's east portico. They have also been held inside the Old Senate Chamber, the chamber of the House of Representatives, and the Capitol rotunda. The most recent regularly scheduled inauguration not to take place at the Capitol was the fourth inauguration of Franklin D. Roosevelt in 1945, which was held at the White House. (Note: In private ceremonies, both Reagan in 1985 and Obama in 2013, began their second terms taking the oath of office at the White House.)

Over the years, various traditions have arisen that have expanded the inauguration from a simple oath-taking ceremony to a day-long event, including parades and multiple social gatherings. The ceremony itself is carried live via the major U.S. commercial television and cable news networks; various ones also stream it live on their websites.

When a president has assumed office intra-term, the inauguration ceremony has been conducted without pomp or fanfare. To facilitate a quick presidential transition under extraordinary circumstances, the new president takes the oath of office in a simple ceremony and usually addresses the nation afterward. This has happened nine times in United States history: eight times after the previous president had died while in office, and once after the previous president had resigned.

== Inauguration ceremonies ==
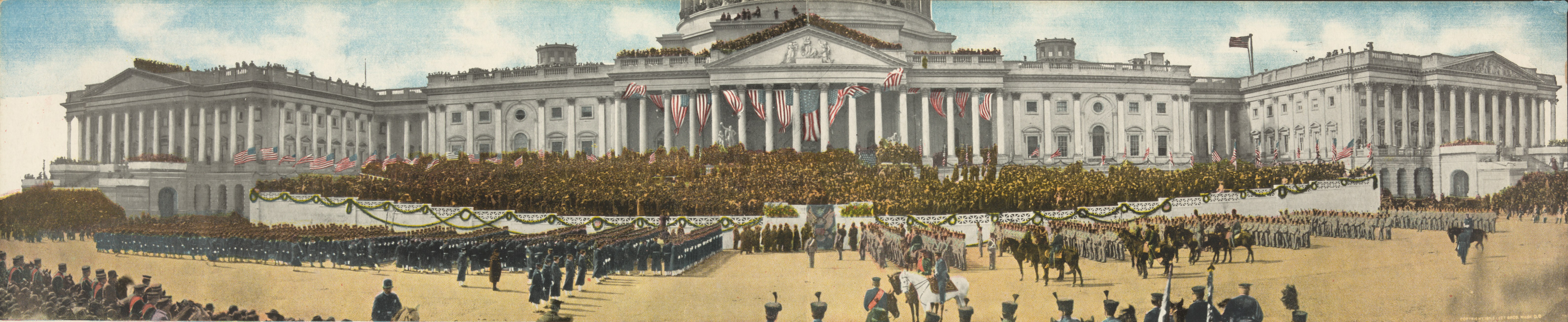
Second inauguration of Theodore Roosevelt, 1905

=== Dates ===
The first inauguration, that of George Washington, took place on April 30, 1789. All subsequent (regular) inaugurations from 1793 until 1933 were held on March 4, the day of the year on which the federal government began operations under the U.S. Constitution in 1789. The exception to this pattern was those years in which March 4 fell on a Sunday. When it did, the public inauguration ceremony would take place on Monday, March 5. This happened on four occasions, in 1821, 1849, 1877, and 1917. Inauguration Day moved to January 20, beginning in 1937, following ratification of the Twentieth Amendment to the Constitution, where it has remained since. A similar Sunday exception and move to Monday is made around this date as well (which happened in 1957, 1985, and 2013).

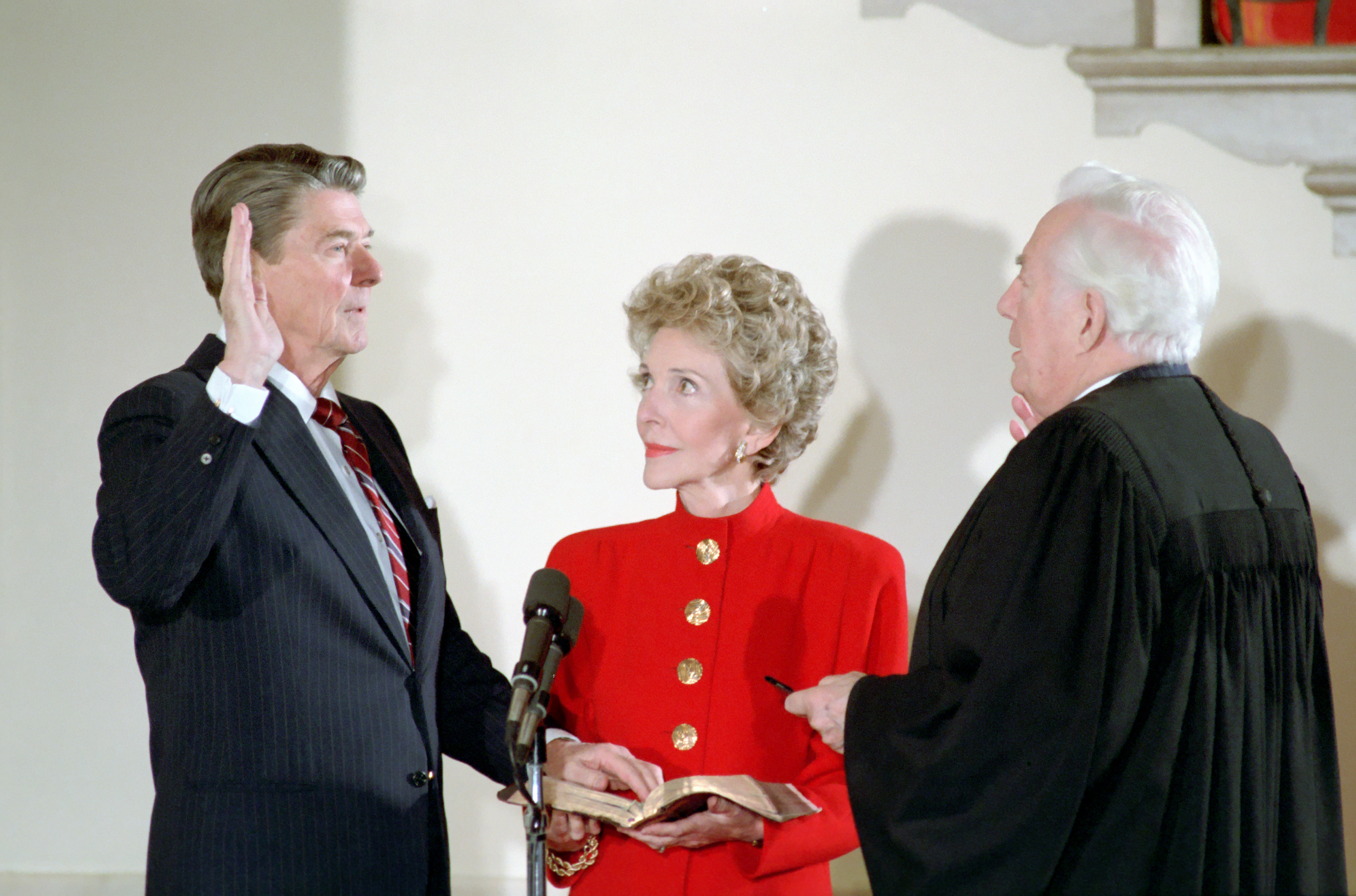
President Reagan being sworn in for his second term "privately" on television, January 20, 1985

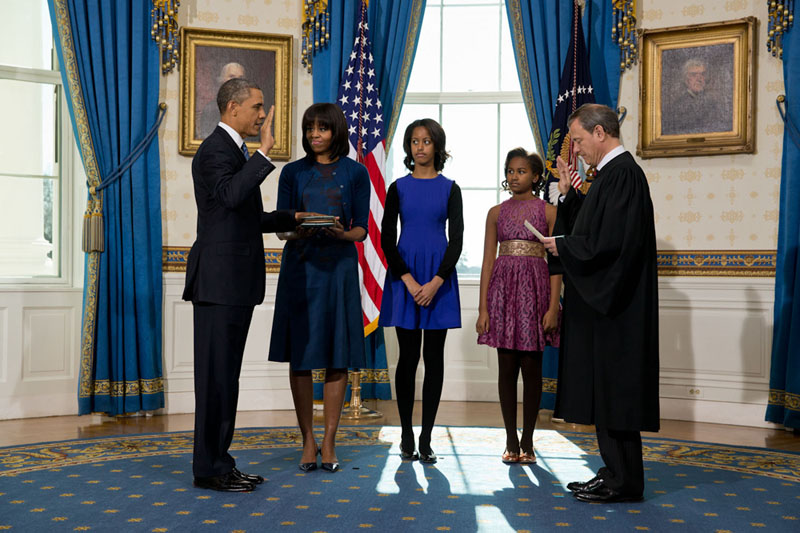
President Obama being sworn in for his second term "privately" on television, January 20, 2013

This resulted in several anomalies. It has been alleged that in 1849, Senate President pro tempore David Rice Atchison was president for a day, although all scholars dismiss that claim. In 1877, due to the controversy over the Compromise of 1877, Rutherford B. Hayes was sworn in secretly on March 3 before Ulysses S. Grant's term ended on March 4—raising the question if the United States had two presidents at the same time for one day. In modern times, the president took the oath on a Sunday in a private ceremony and repeated it the following day with all the pomp and circumstance. In 1985 and 2013, these ceremonies were televised. Irregular inaugurations occurred on nine occasions intra-term, after the death or, in one case, resignation of a president.

Inauguration Day, while not a federal holiday, is observed as a holiday by federal employees who would be working in the "Inauguration Day Area" and who are regularly scheduled to perform non-overtime work on Inauguration Day. There is no in-lieu-of holiday for employees or students who are not regularly scheduled to work or attend school on Inauguration Day. The Inauguration Day Area consists of the District of Columbia; Montgomery and Prince George's counties in Maryland; Arlington and Fairfax counties in Virginia (the City of Fairfax is considered part of Fairfax County for this purpose), and the cities of Alexandria and Falls Church in Virginia.

Inauguration Day fell on Martin Luther King Jr. Day, another federal holiday (designated in 1986), in 1997, 2013, and 2025.

=== Locations ===
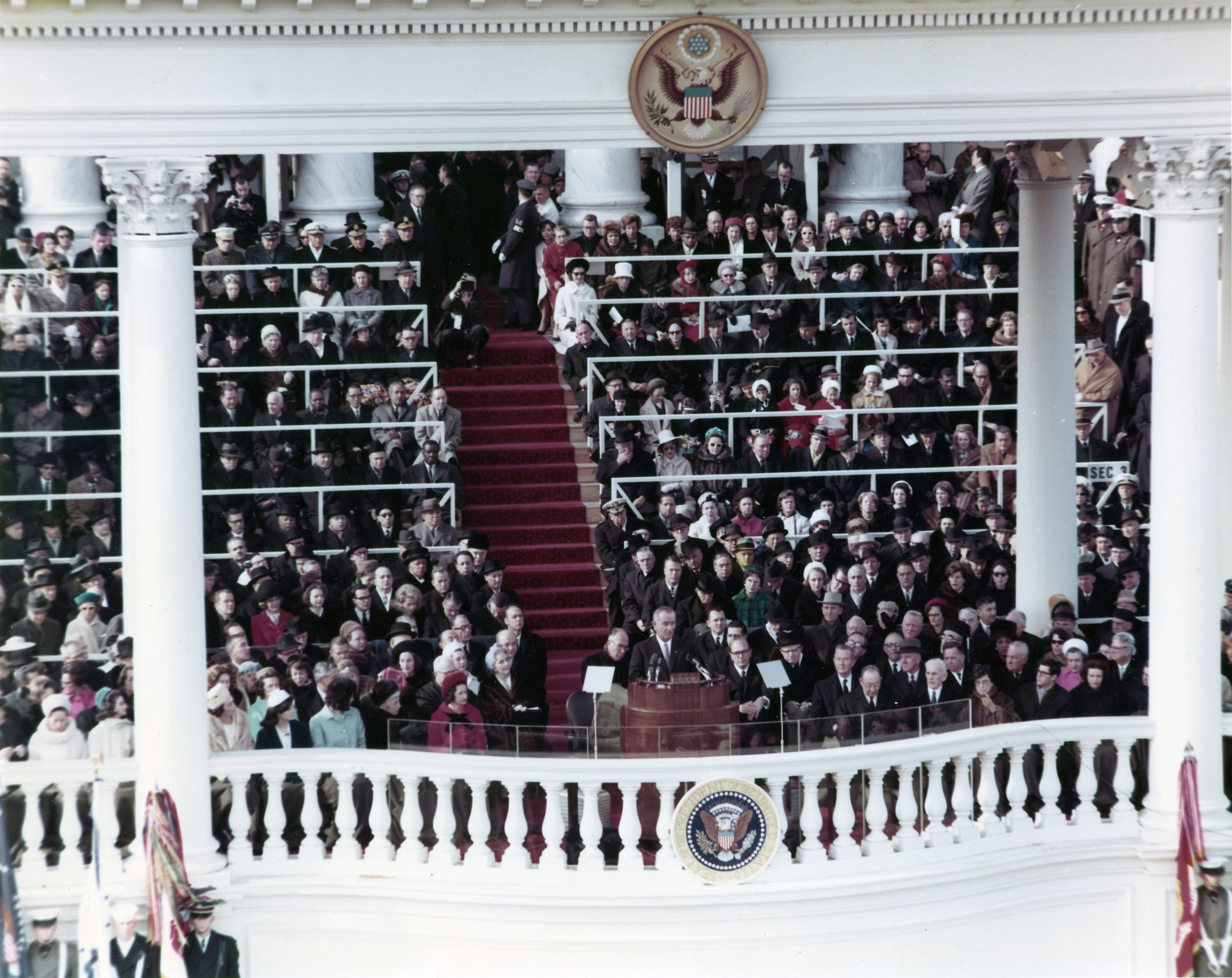
Presidential inauguration at the eastern front of the U.S. Capitol – Lyndon B. Johnson, January 20, 1965

Most presidential inaugurations since 1801 have been held in Washington D.C. at the Capitol Building. Prior inaugurations were held, first at Federal Hall in New York City (1789), and then at Congress Hall in Philadelphia, Pennsylvania (1793 and 1797). Each city was, at the time, the nation's capital. The location for James Monroe's 1817 swearing in was moved to the Old Brick Capitol in Washington due to ongoing restoration work at the Capitol building following the War of 1812. Three other inaugurations—Franklin D. Roosevelt's fourth (1945), Harry S. Truman's first (1945), and Gerald Ford's (1974)—were held at the White House.

Presidential inaugurations (aside from intra-term ceremonies following the death or resignation of a president) have traditionally been outdoor public ceremonies. In 1909, William H. Taft's inauguration was moved to the Senate Chamber due to a blizzard. Then, in 1985, the public second inauguration of Ronald Reagan was held indoors in the Capitol Rotunda because of harsh weather conditions. In 2025, the second inauguration of Donald Trump was moved indoors to the Capitol Rotunda due to extreme cold.

The first inauguration of Andrew Jackson, in 1829, was the first of 35 held on the east front of the Capitol. Since the 1981 first inauguration of Ronald Reagan, they have been held on the Capitol's west front; a move designed to both cut costs and to provide more space for spectators. Above the west front inaugural platform are five large United States flags. The current 50-star flag is displayed in the center. On either side are earlier variations of the national flag: two are the official flag adopted by Congress after the admission to the Union of the new president's home state and two are the 13-star flag popularly known as the Betsy Ross flag.

=== Organizers ===
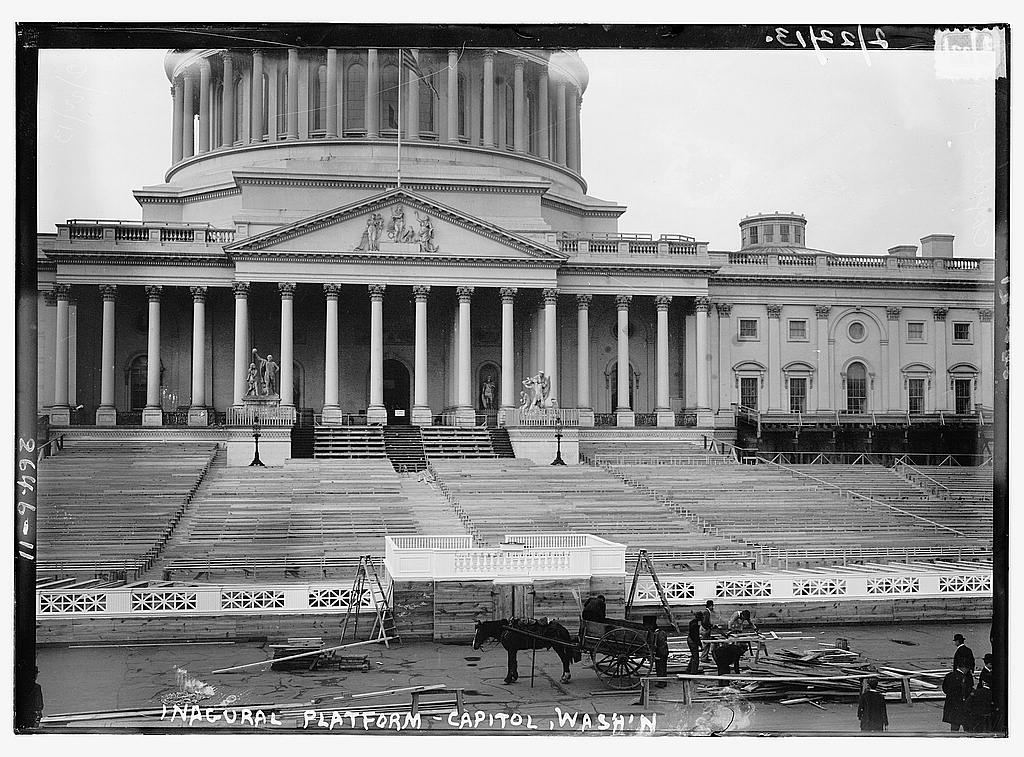
Inauguration platform under construction for Woodrow Wilson's first inauguration in 1913

Before Inauguration Day, the president-elect will name a Presidential Inaugural Committee. This committee is the legal entity responsible for fundraising for and the planning and coordination of all official events and activities surrounding the inauguration of president and vice president (other than the ceremony itself), such as the balls and parade.

Since 1901, the Joint Committee on Inaugural Ceremonies has been responsible for the planning and execution of the swearing-in ceremonies. Since 1953, it has also hosted a luncheon at the U.S. Capitol for the new president, vice president, and guests. Three senators and three representatives make up the committee.

The Joint Task Force National Capital Region, composed of service members from all branches of the United States Armed Forces, including Reserve and National Guard components, is responsible for all military support to ceremonies and to civil authorities for the inaugural period (in 2017, January 15–24). U.S. military personnel have participated in Inauguration Day ceremonies since 1789 when members of the Continental Army, local militia units and Revolutionary War veterans escorted George Washington to his first inauguration ceremony. Their participation traditionally includes musical units, color guards, salute batteries and honor cordons. Military support to the inauguration honors the new president, who is commander-in-chief of the armed forces, and recognizes civilian control of the military.

=== Attendees ===
In addition to the public, the attendees at the inauguration generally include the vice president, members of Congress, Supreme Court justices, high-ranking military officers, former presidents and vice-presidents, living Medal of Honor recipients, and other dignitaries. The outgoing president and vice president also customarily attend the ceremony.

While most outgoing presidents have appeared on the inaugural platform with their successor, six did not:

- John Adams left Washington rather than attend the 1801 inauguration of Thomas Jefferson
- John Quincy Adams also left town, unwilling to be present for the 1829 inauguration of Andrew Jackson
- Martin Van Buren was, due to his son being ill and political rancor between Whigs and Democrats, not present for the 1841 inauguration of William Henry Harrison
- Andrew Johnson conducted a final cabinet meeting rather than attend the 1869 inauguration of Ulysses S. Grant.
- Woodrow Wilson, due to poor health, remained inside the Capitol Building during the 1921 inauguration of Warren G. Harding
- Donald Trump held a "departure ceremony" and then left Washington, D.C. prior to the 2021 inauguration of Joe Biden

=== Communication ===
The way inauguration ceremony events are communicated to the public has changed over the years with each advance in technology. Improvements in mass media technologies have allowed presidents to reach substantially greater numbers of their constituents. In 1829, Andrew Jackson spoke to approximately 10,000 people at his inauguration. Most recently, in 2017, it is estimated that about 160,000 people were in the National Mall areas in the hour leading up to Donald Trump's swearing in. An additional 30.6 million people in the United States watched it on television, and more than 6.8 million worldwide streamed it live on Twitter. Among the inauguration mass communication milestones are:

- 1801 first inauguration of Thomas Jefferson, first newspaper extra of an inaugural address, printed by the National Intelligencer
- 1845 inauguration of James K. Polk, first inauguration to be covered by telegraph, and first known newspaper illustration of a presidential inauguration (The Illustrated London News)
- 1857 inauguration of James Buchanan, first inauguration known to have been photographed
- 1897 first inauguration of William McKinley, first inauguration to be recorded on film
- 1905 second inauguration of Theodore Roosevelt, first time that telephones were installed on the Capitol Grounds for an inauguration
- 1925 second inauguration of Calvin Coolidge, first inauguration to be broadcast nationally by radio
- 1929 inauguration of Herbert Hoover, first inauguration to be recorded by a talking newsreel
- 1949 second inauguration of Harry S. Truman, first inauguration to be televised
- 1961 inauguration of John F. Kennedy, first inauguration to be televised in color
- 1981 first inauguration of Ronald Reagan, first closed-captioning of television broadcast for the deaf and hard of hearing
- 1997 second inauguration of Bill Clinton, first time that the ceremony was broadcast live on the Internet

== Ceremonial aspects ==
Inauguration procedure is governed by tradition rather than the Constitution, the only constitutionally required procedure being the presidential oath of office (which may be taken anywhere, with anyone in attendance who can legally witness an oath, and at any time prior to the actual beginning of the new president's term). Traditionally, the president-elect arrives at the White House and then proceeds to the Capitol Building with the out-going president. Around or after 12 noon, the president takes the oath of office, usually administered by the chief justice of the United States, and then delivers the inaugural address.

=== Oaths of office ===
Barack Obama takes the oath of office from Chief Justice John Roberts during his 2009 presidential inauguration on January 20, 2009.

First inauguration of Barack Obama (January 20, 2009) (21:21)
Video of the first inauguration of Barack Obama.

First inauguration of Barack Obama (January 20, 2009)
audio only version

The vice president is sworn into office in the same ceremony as the president. Prior to 1937, the vice presidential oath was administered in the Senate Chamber (in keeping with the vice president's position as president of the Senate). The oath is administered to the vice president first. Immediately afterwards, the United States Marine Band will perform four "ruffles and flourishes", followed by "Hail, Columbia". Unlike the presidential oath, however, the Constitution does not specify specific words that must be spoken. Several variants of the oath have been used since 1789. The current form, which is also recited by senators, representatives, and other government officers, has been in use since 1884:

I do solemnly swear (or affirm) that I will support and defend the Constitution of the United States against all enemies, foreign and domestic; that I will bear true faith and allegiance to the same; that I take this obligation freely, without any mental reservation or purpose of evasion; and that I will well and faithfully discharge the duties of the office on which I am about to enter. So help me God.

At noon, the new presidential and vice presidential terms begin. At about that time, the president recites the constitutionally mandated oath of office:

I do solemnly swear (or affirm) that I will faithfully execute the office of President of the United States, and will to the best of my ability, preserve, protect, and defend the Constitution of the United States.

According to Washington Irving's biography of George Washington, after reciting the oath at his (and the nation's) first inauguration, Washington added the words "so help me God". However, the only contemporaneous source that fully reproduced Washington's oath completely lacks the religious codicil. The first newspaper report that actually described the exact words used in an oath of office, Chester Arthur's in 1881, repeated the "query-response" method where the words, "so help me God" were a personal prayer, not a part of the constitutional oath. The time of adoption of the current procedure, where both the chief justice and the president speak the oath, is unknown.

The oath of office was administered to Washington in 1789 by Robert Livingston, Chancellor of New York State. Four years later, the oath was administered by Supreme Court associate justice William Cushing. Since the 1797 inauguration of John Adams, it has become customary for the new president to be sworn into office by the Chief Justice of the United States. Others have administered the oath on occasions when a new president assumed office intra-term due to the incumbent's death or resignation. William Cranch, chief judge of the U.S. Circuit Court, administered the oath of office to John Tyler in 1841 when he succeeded to the presidency upon William Henry Harrison's death, and to Millard Fillmore in 1850 when Zachary Taylor died. In 1923, upon being informed of Warren Harding's death, while visiting his family home in Plymouth Notch, Vermont, Calvin Coolidge was sworn in as president by his father, John Calvin Coolidge, Sr., a notary public. Most recently, federal judge Sarah T. Hughes administered the oath of office to Lyndon B. Johnson aboard Air Force One after John F. Kennedy's assassination on November 22, 1963.

Since 1789 there have been 60 inaugural ceremonies to mark the commencement of a new four-year term of a president of the United States, and an additional nine marking the start of a partial presidential term following the intra-term death or resignation of an incumbent president. With the 2025 inauguration of Donald Trump, the oath has been taken 74 different times by 45 people. This numerical discrepancy results chiefly from two factors: a president must take the oath at the beginning of each term of office, and, because the day of inauguration has sometimes fallen on a Sunday, five presidents have taken the oath privately before the public inaugural ceremonies.

There is no requirement that any book, or in particular a book of sacred text, be used to administer the oath, and none is mentioned in the Constitution. By convention, incoming presidents raise their right hand and place the left on a Bible or other book while taking the oath of office. While most have, John Quincy Adams did not use a Bible when taking the oath in 1825; neither did Theodore Roosevelt in 1901. In 1853, Franklin Pierce affirmed the oath of office rather than swear it. More recently, a Catholic missal was used for Lyndon B. Johnson's 1963 swearing in ceremony.

Bibles of historical significance have sometimes been used at inaugurations. George H. W. Bush, Jimmy Carter and Dwight D. Eisenhower used the George Washington Inaugural Bible. Barack Obama placed his hand upon the Lincoln Bible for his oaths in 2009 and 2013, as did Donald Trump in 2017. Joe Biden placed his hand upon a large leather-bound family Bible. Trump used the Lincoln Bible again, along with a childhood Bible given to him by his mother, at his second inauguration, though he did not place his hand on either Bible during the oath of office.

Four ruffles and flourishes played before "Hail to the Chief"

Immediately after the presidential oath, the United States Marine Band will perform four "ruffles and flourishes", followed by "Hail to the Chief", while simultaneously, a 21-gun salute is fired using artillery pieces from the Presidential Guns Salute Battery, 3rd United States Infantry Regiment "The Old Guard" located in Taft Park, north of the Capitol. The actual gun salute begins with the first "ruffle and flourish", and "run long" (i.e. the salute concludes after "Hail to the Chief" has ended). The Marine Band, which is believed to have made its inaugural debut in 1801 for Thomas Jefferson's first inauguration, is the only musical unit to participate in all three components of the presidential inauguration: the swearing-in ceremony, the inaugural parade, and an inaugural ball. During the ceremony, the band is positioned directly below the presidential podium at the U.S. Capitol.

=== Inaugural address ===
Inaugural address of President Joe Biden. (31:44)
The inaugural address, in full, made by Joe Biden after being sworn in as the 46th president of the United States on January 20, 2021.

Newly sworn-in presidents usually give a speech referred to as an inaugural address. As with many inaugural customs, this one was started by George Washington in 1789. After taking his oath of office on the balcony of Federal Hall, he proceeded to the Senate chamber where he read a speech before members of Congress and other dignitaries. Every president since Washington has delivered an inaugural address. While many of the early presidents read their addresses before taking the oath, current custom dictates that the chief justice administer the oath first, followed by the president's speech. William McKinley requested the change in 1897, so that he could reiterate the words of the oath at the close of his first inaugural address.

William Henry Harrison delivered the longest inaugural address, at 8,445 words, in 1841. John Adams' 1797 address, which totaled 2,308 words, contained the longest sentence, at 737 words. In 1793, Washington gave the shortest inaugural address on record, just 135 words.

Most presidents use their inaugural address to present their vision of America and to set forth their goals for the nation. Some of the most eloquent and powerful speeches are still quoted today. In 1865, in the waning days of the Civil War, Abraham Lincoln stated, "With malice toward none, with charity for all, with firmness in the right as God gives us to see the right, let us strive on to finish the work we are in, to bind up the nation's wounds, to care for him who shall have borne the battle and for his widow and his orphan, to do all which may achieve and cherish a just and lasting peace among ourselves and with all nations." In 1933, Franklin D. Roosevelt avowed, "the only thing we have to fear is fear itself.” And in 1961, John F. Kennedy declared, "And so my fellow Americans: ask not what your country can do for you – ask what you can do for your country."

On the eight occasions where the new president succeeded to the office upon their predecessor's death intra-term, none gave an address, but each did address Congress soon thereafter. When Gerald Ford became president in 1974, following the resignation of Richard Nixon, he addressed the nation after taking the oath, but he characterized his speech as "Not an inaugural address, not a fireside chat, not a campaign speech – just a little straight talk among friends".

=== Prayers ===
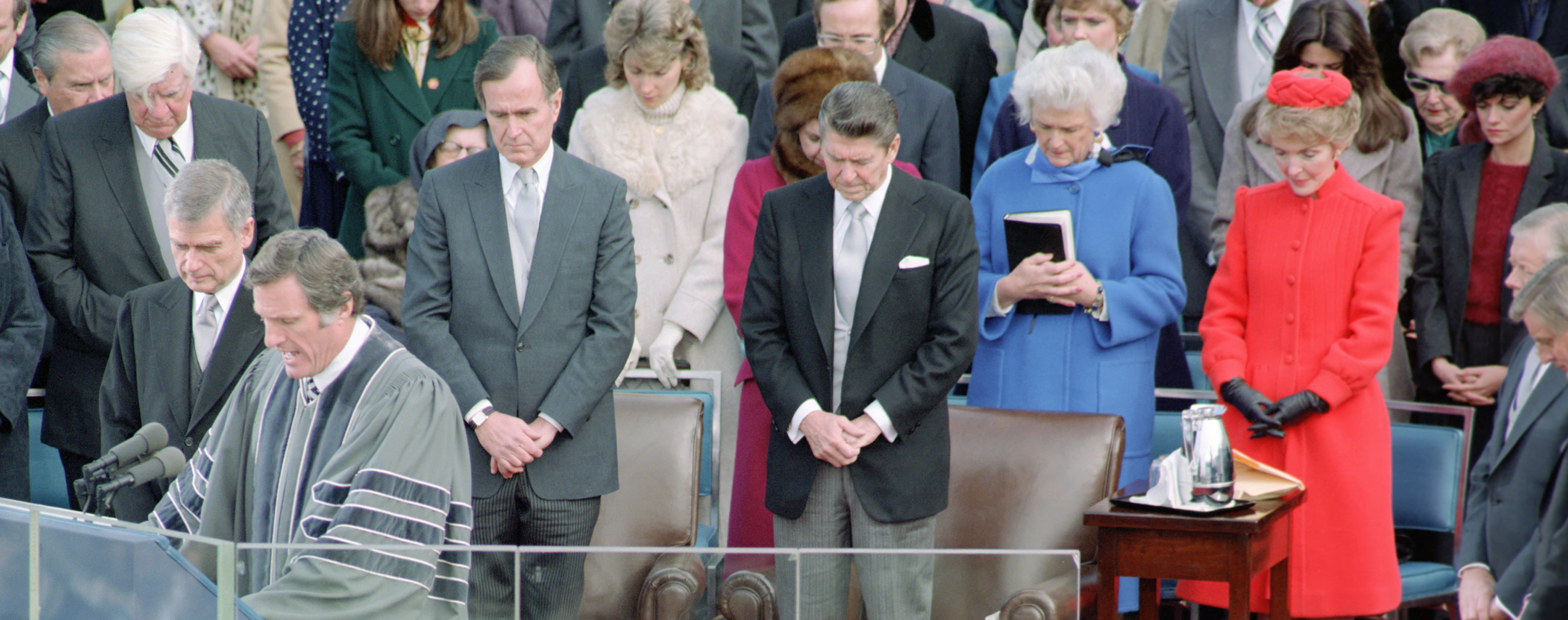
The Reverend Donn Moomaw delivers the invocation at the first inauguration of Ronald Reagan, 1981.

Since 1937, the ceremony has incorporated one or more prayers. Since 1933 an associated prayer service either public or private attended by the president-elect has often taken place on the morning of the day. At times a major public or broadcast prayer service takes place after the main ceremony most recently on the next day.

=== Poems ===
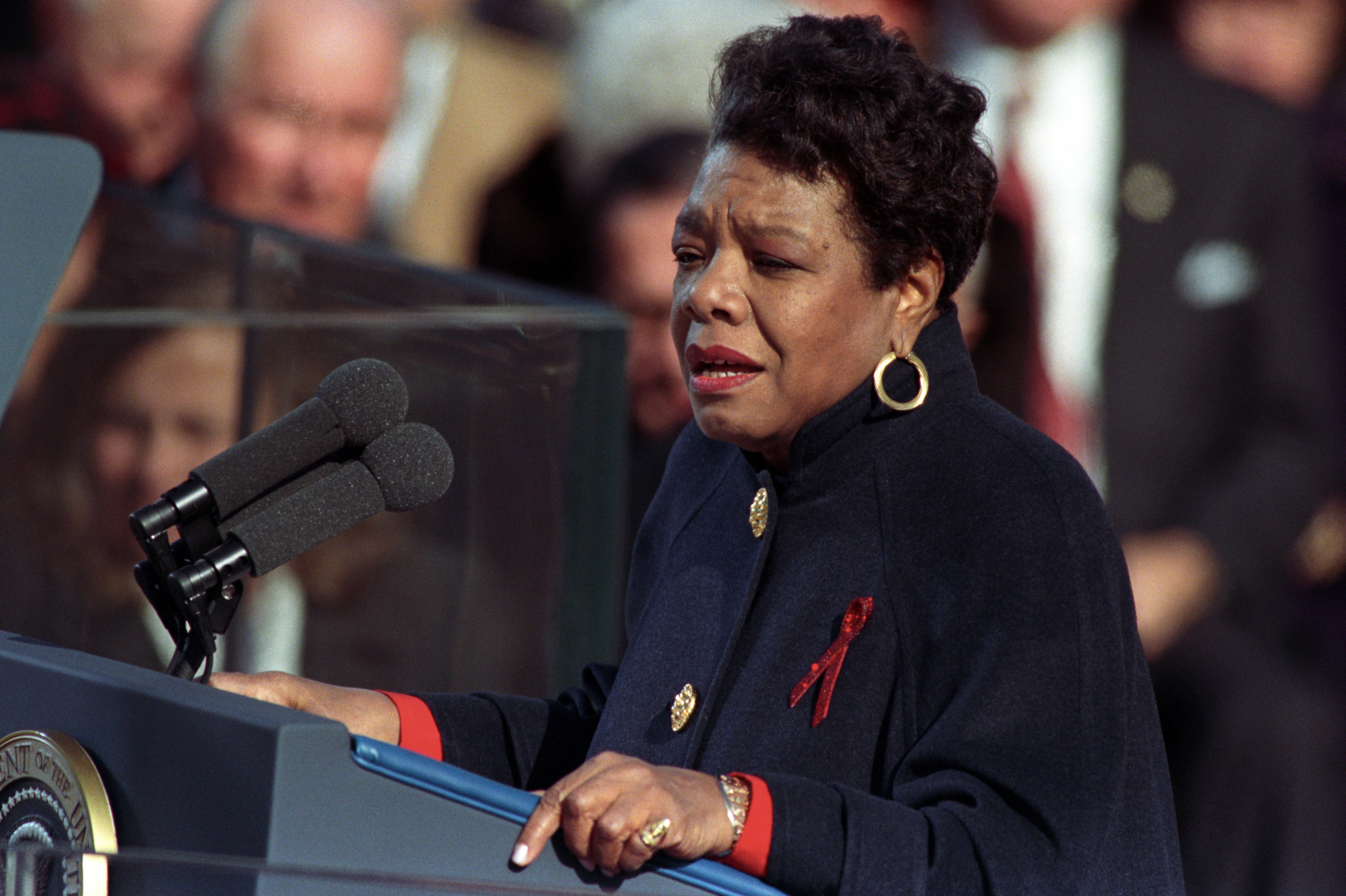
Maya Angelou delivering her poem "On the Pulse of Morning" at Bill Clinton's inauguration in 1993

Several inaugural ceremonies since 1961 have included a reading by a poet. The following poetry readings have taken place:

- Inauguration of John F. Kennedy (1961): Robert Frost read part of "Dedication" and recited "The Gift Outright"
- First inauguration of Bill Clinton (1993): Maya Angelou read her poem "On the Pulse of Morning"
- Second inauguration of Bill Clinton (1997): Miller Williams read his poem "Of History and Hope"
- First inauguration of Barack Obama (2009): Elizabeth Alexander read her poem "Praise Song for the Day"
- Second inauguration of Barack Obama (2013): Richard Blanco read his poem "One Today"
- Inauguration of Joe Biden (2021): Amanda Gorman read her poem "The Hill We Climb"

== Other elements ==
Over the years, various inauguration traditions have arisen that have expanded the event from a simple oath-taking ceremony to a day-long one, including parades, speeches, and balls. In fact, contemporary inaugural celebrations typically span 10 days, from five days before the inauguration to five days after. On some occasions however, either due to the preferences of the new president or to other constraining circumstances, they have been scaled back. Such was the case in 1945, because of rationing in effect during World War II. More recently, in 1973, the celebrations marking Richard Nixon's second inauguration were altered because of the death of former president Lyndon B. Johnson two days after the ceremony. All pending events were cancelled so preparations for Johnson's state funeral could begin.

=== Congressional luncheon ===
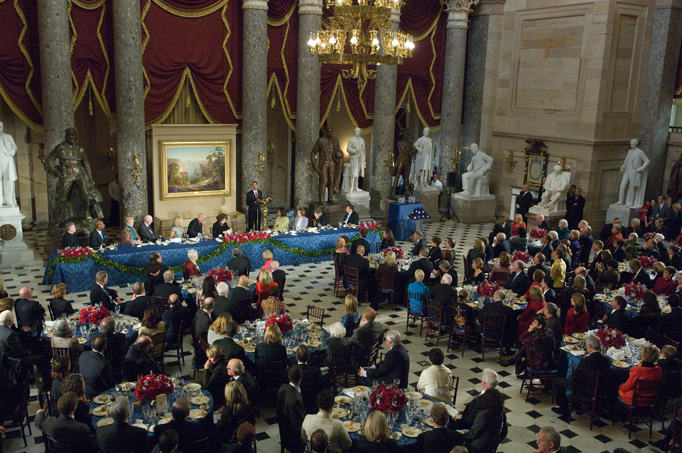
Barack Obama's 2009 inaugural luncheon

Since 1953, the president and vice president have been guests of honor at a luncheon held by the leadership of the United States Congress immediately following the inaugural ceremony. The luncheon is held in Statuary Hall and is organized by the Joint Congressional Committee on Inaugural Ceremonies, and attended by the leadership of both houses of Congress as well as guests of the president and vice president. By tradition, the outgoing president and vice president will not attend. The 2021 inaugural luncheon was canceled due to the COVID-19 pandemic.

=== Inaugural parade ===
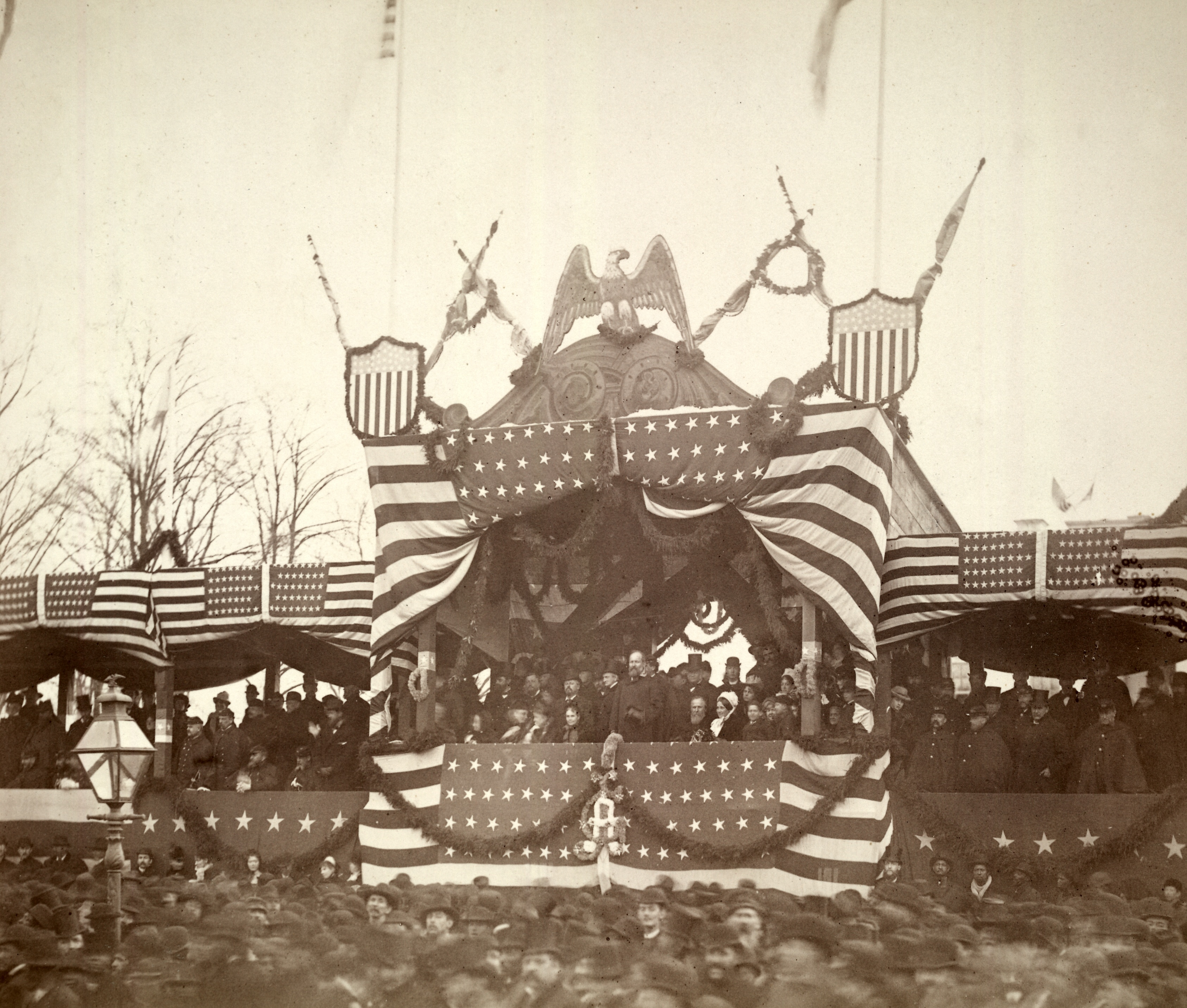
The inaugural parade on Pennsylvania Avenue passes the presidential reviewing stand in front of the White House in March 1881.

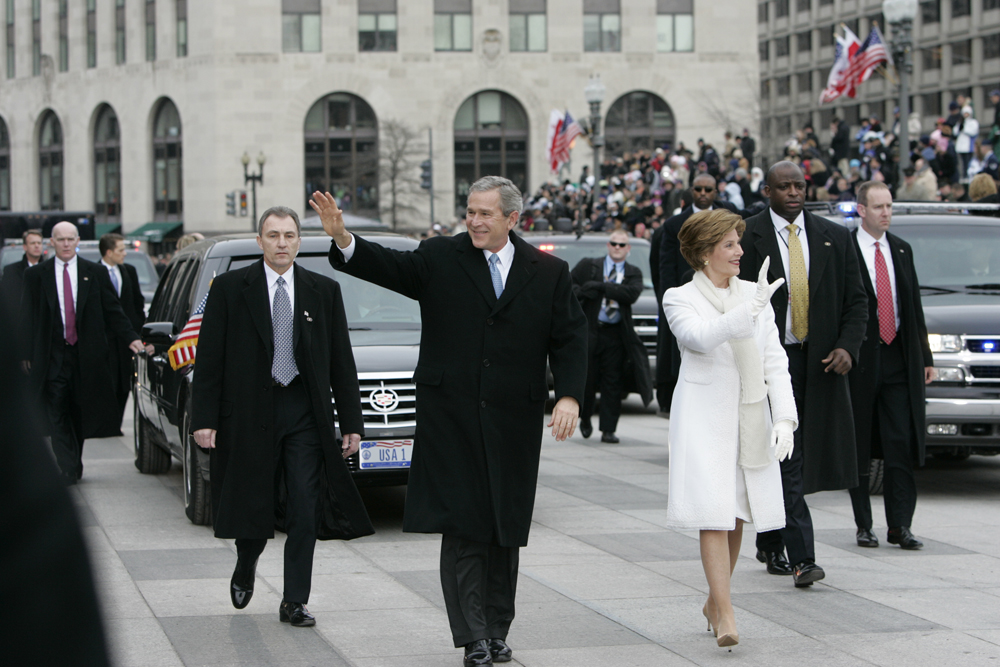
Inauguration Day, January 20, 2005: President George W. Bush and First Lady Laura Bush lead the inaugural parade from the Capitol, down Pennsylvania Avenue to the White House

Following the arrival of the presidential entourage to the White House, it is customary for the president, vice-president, their respective families and leading members of the government and military to review an inaugural parade from an enclosed stand at the edge of the North Lawn, a custom begun by James Garfield in 1881. The parade, which proceeds along 1.5 miles (2.4 km) of Pennsylvania Avenue in front of the stand and the Front Lawn in view of the presidential party, features both military and civilian participants from all 50 states and the District of Columbia; this parade largely evolved from the post-inaugural procession to the White House, and occurred as far back as Jefferson's second inauguration in 1805, when workers from the Washington Navy Yard, accompanied by military music, marched with the president on foot as he rode on horseback from the Capitol to the White House. By the time of William Henry Harrison's inauguration in 1841, political clubs and marching societies would regularly travel to Washington for the parade. That year was also the first in which floats were part of the parade. It was at Lincoln's second inauguration, in 1865, that Native Americans and African Americans participated in the inaugural parade for the first time. Women were involved for the first time in 1917.

In 1829, following his first inaugural parade, Andrew Jackson held a public reception at the White House, during which 20,000 people created such a crush that Jackson had to escape through a window. Nevertheless, White House receptions continued until lengthy afternoon parades created scheduling problems. Reviving the idea in 1989, President George H. W. Bush invited the public to a "White House American Welcome" on the day after the inaugural.

Grover Cleveland’s 1885 inaugural parade lasted three hours and showcased 25,000 marchers. Eighty years later, Lyndon Johnson’s parade included 52 select bands. Dwight D. Eisenhower's 1953 parade included about 22,000 service men and women and 5,000 civilians, which included 50 state and organization floats costing $100,000. There were also 65 musical units, 350 horses, 3 elephants, an Alaskan dog team, and the 280-millimeter atomic cannon.

In 1977, Jimmy Carter became the first president to set out by foot for more than a mile on the route to the White House. The walk has become a tradition that has been matched in ceremony if not in length by the presidents who followed.

Twice during the 20th century, an inaugural parade down Pennsylvania Avenue was not held. In 1945, at the height of World War II, Franklin D. Roosevelt's fourth Inauguration was simple and austere with no fanfare or formal celebration following the event. There was no parade because of gas rationing and a lumber shortage. In 1985, with the temperature near 7 °F (−14 °C), all outdoor events for Ronald Reagan's second inauguration were canceled or moved indoors.

=== Post-inaugural interfaith national prayer service ===
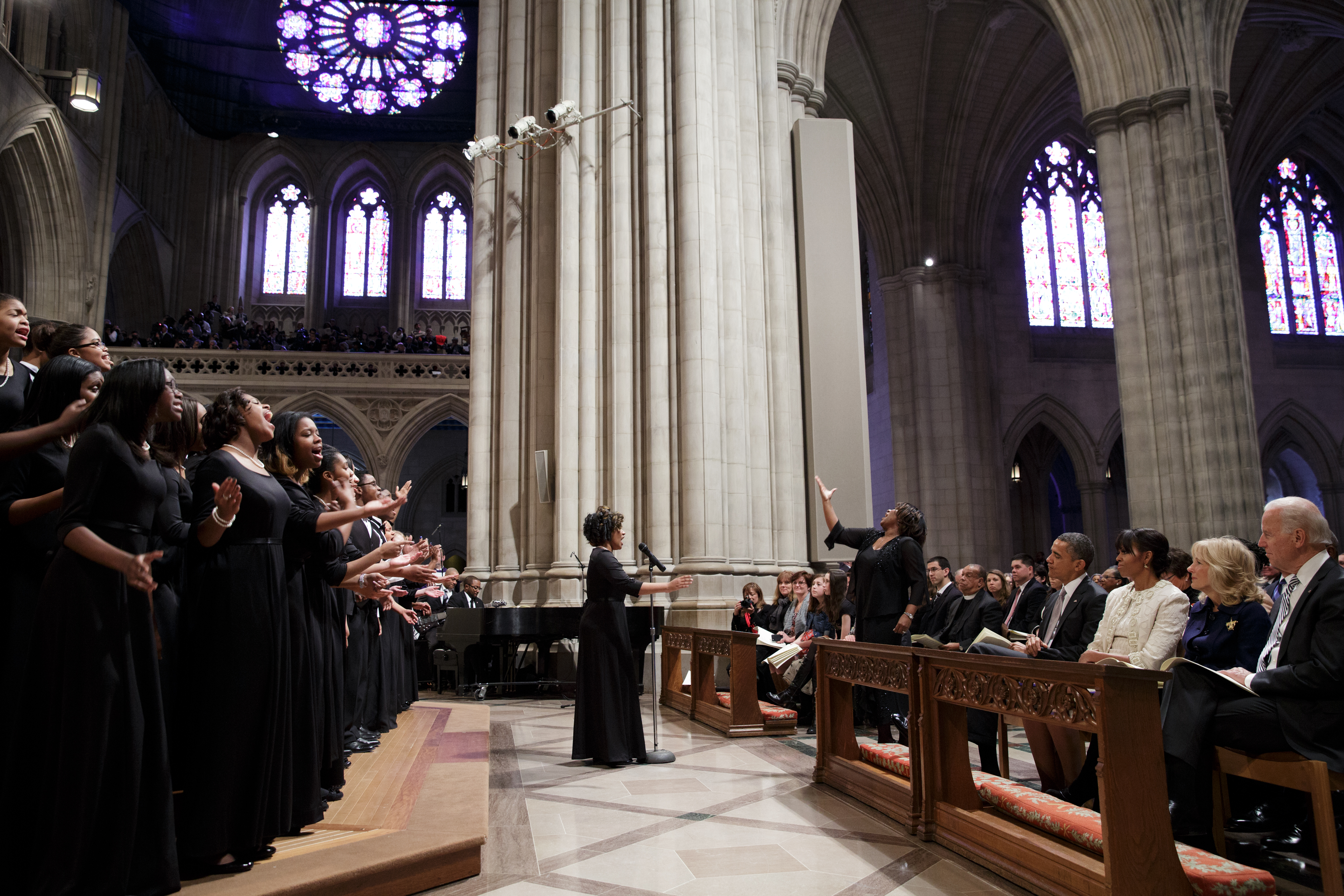
Barack Obama, Michelle Obama, Joe Biden, and Jill Biden at the 2013 National Prayer Service

A prayer service associated with the inauguration dates back to George Washington. The modern tradition of a public interfaith service at the Washington National Cathedral (which belongs to the Episcopal Church) began in 1933, following the first inauguration of Franklin D. Roosevelt. Held the morning after the inauguration, the service typically includes representatives from various Christian denominations and non-Christian religions. Attendance is by invitation only, with tickets issued by the Cathedral and the Presidential Inaugural Committee.

=== Inaugural balls ===
The first Inaugural Ball was held on the night of James Madison's first inauguration in 1809. Tickets were $4 and it took place at Long's Hotel.

=== Security ===
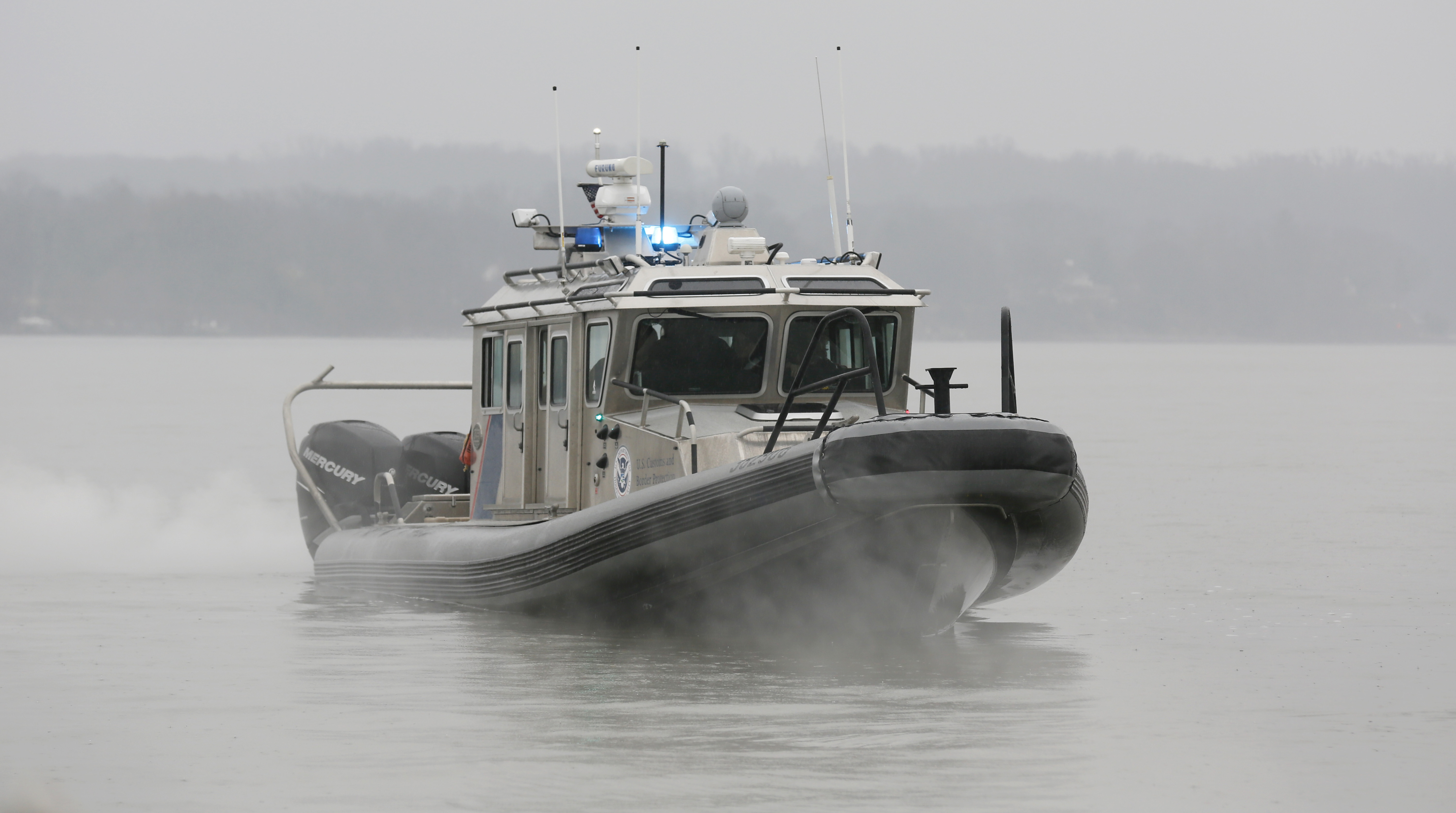
A U.S. Customs and Border Protection boat patrolling the waterways around Washington, D.C. prior to the inauguration of Donald Trump in 2017.

The security for the inaugural celebrations is a complex matter, involving the Secret Service, Department of Homeland Security, Federal Protective Service (DHS-FPS), all six branches of the Armed Forces, the Capitol Police, the United States Park Police (USPP), and the Metropolitan Police Department of the District of Columbia (MPDC). Federal law enforcement agencies also sometimes request assistance from various other state and local law-enforcement agencies throughout the United States.

=== Presidential medals ===
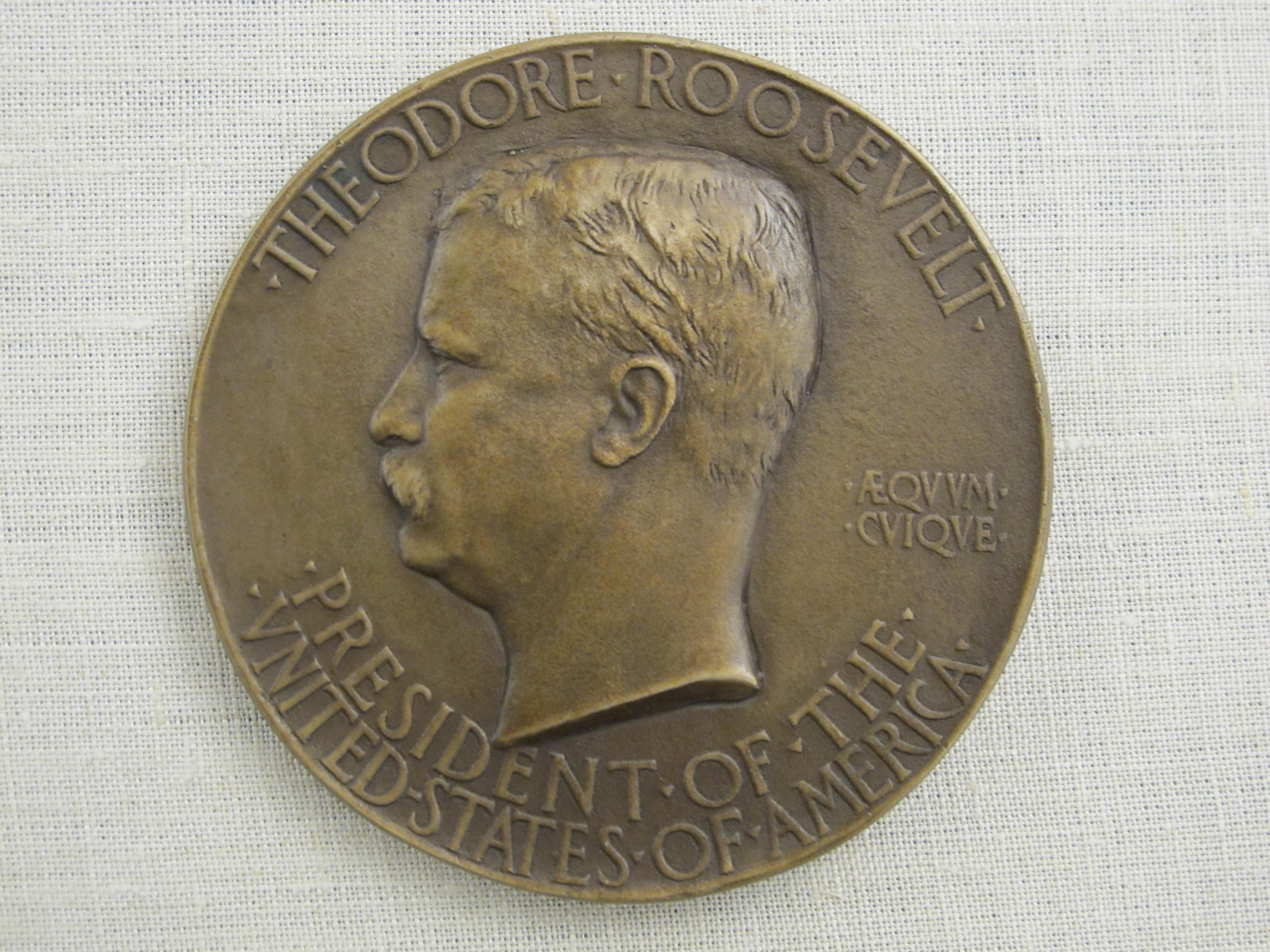
A presidential medal from the inauguration of Theodore Roosevelt in 1905

Beginning with George Washington, there has been a traditional association with Inauguration festivities and the production of a presidential medal. With the District of Columbia attracting thousands of attendees for inauguration, presidential medals were an inexpensive souvenir for the tourists to remember the occasion. However, the once-simple trinket turned into an official presidential election memento. In 1901, the first Inauguration Committee on Medals and Badges was established as part of the official Inauguration Committee for the re-election of President McKinley. The Committee saw official medals as a way to raise funding for the festivities. Gold medals were to be produced as gifts for the president, vice president, and committee chair; silver medals were to be created and distributed among Inauguration Committee members, and bronze medals would be for sale for public consumption. McKinley's medal was simple with his portrait on one side and writing on the other side.

Unlike his predecessor, when Theodore Roosevelt took his oath of office in 1905, he found the previous presidential medal unacceptable. As an art lover and admirer of the ancient Greek high-relief coins, Roosevelt wanted more than a simple medal—he wanted a work of art. To achieve this goal, the president hired Augustus Saint-Gaudens, a famous American sculptor, to design and create his inauguration medal. Saint-Gaudens' obsession with perfection resulted in a forestalled release and the medals were distributed after the actual inauguration. Nonetheless, President Roosevelt was very pleased with the result. Saint-Gaudens' design, executed by Adolph A. Weinman, was cast by Tiffany & Company and was proclaimed an artistic triumph. Saint-Gaudens' practice of creating a portrait sculpture of the newly elected president is still used today in presidential medal creation. After the president sits for the sculptor, the resulting clay sketch is turned into a life mask and plaster model. Finishing touches are added and the epoxy cast that is created is used to produce the die cuts. The die cuts are then used to strike the president's portrait on each medal.

From 1929 through 1949, the official medal was struck by the U.S. Mint. This changed in 1953 when the Medallic Art Company was chosen to strike Walker Hancock's portrait of President Eisenhower. The official medals have been struck by private mints ever since. The Smithsonian Institution and The George Washington University hold the two most complete collections of presidential medals in the United States.

Gerald Ford's unscheduled inauguration also had a medal.

== List of inauguration ceremonies ==
The 60 inauguration ceremonies marking the start of a new four-year presidential term of office and also the nine marking the start of a partial presidential term following the intra-term death or resignation of an incumbent president are listed in the table below.

No.	Date	Event (Note: Events (inaugurations) sort alphabetically by president's last name.)	Location	Oath administered by	Address length
1st	April 30, 1789 (Thursday)	First inauguration of George Washington	Front balcony, Federal Hall; New York, New York	Robert Livingston, Chancellor of New York	1431 words Full text
2nd	March 4, 1793 (Monday)	Second inauguration of George Washington	Senate Chamber, Congress Hall; Philadelphia, Pennsylvania	William Cushing, Associate Justice, U.S. Supreme Court	135 words Full text
3rd	March 4, 1797 (Saturday)	Inauguration of John Adams	House Chamber, Congress Hall	Oliver Ellsworth, Chief Justice of the United States	2308 words Full text
4th	March 4, 1801 (Wednesday)	First inauguration of Thomas Jefferson	Senate Chamber, U.S. Capitol; Washington, D.C.	John Marshall, Chief Justice	1730 words Full text
5th	March 4, 1805 (Monday)	Second inauguration of Thomas Jefferson	Senate Chamber, U.S. Capitol	John Marshall, Chief Justice	2166 words Full text
6th	March 4, 1809 (Saturday)	First inauguration of James Madison	House Chamber, U.S. Capitol	John Marshall, Chief Justice	1177 words Full text
7th	March 4, 1813 (Thursday)	Second inauguration of James Madison	House Chamber, U.S. Capitol	John Marshall, Chief Justice	1211 words Full text
8th	March 4, 1817 (Tuesday)	First inauguration of James Monroe	Front steps, Old Brick Capitol	John Marshall, Chief Justice	3375 words Full text
9th	March 5, 1821 (Note: Term began Sunday, March 4.) (Monday)	Second inauguration of James Monroe	House Chamber, U.S. Capitol	John Marshall, Chief Justice	4472 words Full text
10th	March 4, 1825 (Friday)	Inauguration of John Quincy Adams	House Chamber, U.S. Capitol	John Marshall, Chief Justice	2915 words Full text
11th	March 4, 1829 (Wednesday)	First inauguration of Andrew Jackson	East Portico, U.S. Capitol	John Marshall, Chief Justice	1128 words Full text
12th	March 4, 1833 (Monday)	Second inauguration of Andrew Jackson	House Chamber, U.S. Capitol	John Marshall, Chief Justice	1176 words Full text
13th	March 4, 1837 (Saturday)	Inauguration of Martin Van Buren	East Portico, U.S. Capitol	Roger B. Taney, Chief Justice	3843 words Full text
14th	March 4, 1841 (Thursday)	Inauguration of William Henry Harrison	East Portico, U.S. Capitol	Roger B. Taney, Chief Justice	8460 words Full text
—	April 6, 1841 (Note: Term began when President Harrison died on April 4.) (Tuesday)	Inauguration of John Tyler (Extraordinary inauguration)	Brown's Indian Queen Hotel, Washington, D.C.	William Cranch; Chief Judge, U.S. Circuit Court of the District of Columbia	—
15th	March 4, 1845 (Tuesday)	Inauguration of James K. Polk	East Portico, U.S. Capitol	Roger B. Taney, Chief Justice	4809 words Full text
16th	March 5, 1849 (Monday)	Inauguration of Zachary Taylor	East Portico, U.S. Capitol	Roger B. Taney, Chief Justice	1090 words Full text
—	July 10, 1850 (Note: Term began when President Taylor died on July 9.) (Wednesday)	Inauguration of Millard Fillmore (Extraordinary inauguration)	House Chamber, U.S. Capitol	William Cranch; Chief Judge, U.S. Circuit Court of the D.C.	—
17th	March 4, 1853 (Friday)	Inauguration of Franklin Pierce	East Portico, U.S. Capitol	Roger B. Taney, Chief Justice	3336 words Full text
18th	March 4, 1857 (Wednesday)	Inauguration of James Buchanan	East Portico, U.S. Capitol	Roger B. Taney, Chief Justice	2831 words Full text
19th	March 4, 1861 (Monday)	First inauguration of Abraham Lincoln	East Portico, U.S. Capitol	Roger B. Taney, Chief Justice	3637 words Full text
20th	March 4, 1865 (Saturday)	Second inauguration of Abraham Lincoln	East Portico, U.S. Capitol	Salmon P. Chase, Chief Justice	700 words Full text
—	April 15, 1865 (Saturday)	Inauguration of Andrew Johnson (Extraordinary inauguration)	Kirkwood House, Washington, D.C.	Salmon P. Chase, Chief Justice	—
21st	March 4, 1869 (Thursday)	First inauguration of Ulysses S. Grant	East Portico, U.S. Capitol	Salmon P. Chase, Chief Justice	1127 words Full text
22nd	March 4, 1873 (Tuesday)	Second inauguration of Ulysses S. Grant	East Portico, U.S. Capitol	Salmon P. Chase; Chief Justice	1339 words Full text
23rd	March 5, 1877 (Monday)	Inauguration of Rutherford B. Hayes	East Portico, U.S. Capitol	Morrison Waite, Chief Justice	2486 words Full text
24th	March 4, 1881 (Friday)	Inauguration of James A. Garfield	East Portico, U.S. Capitol	Morrison Waite, Chief Justice	2979 words Full text
—	September 20, 1881 (Note: Term began when President Garfield died on September 19.) (Tuesday)	Inauguration of Chester A. Arthur (Extraordinary inauguration)	Chester A. Arthur Home, New York, New York	John R. Brady, Justice of the New York Supreme Court	—
25th	March 4, 1885 (Wednesday)	First inauguration of Grover Cleveland	East Portico, U.S. Capitol	Morrison Waite, Chief Justice	1686 words Full text
26th	March 4, 1889 (Monday)	Inauguration of Benjamin Harrison	East Portico, U.S. Capitol	Melville Fuller, Chief Justice	4392 words Full text
27th	March 4, 1893 (Saturday)	Second inauguration of Grover Cleveland	East Portico, U.S. Capitol	Melville Fuller, Chief Justice	2015 words Full text
28th	March 4, 1897 (Thursday)	First inauguration of William McKinley	Front of original Senate Wing; U.S. Capitol	Melville Fuller, Chief Justice	3968 words Full text
29th	March 4, 1901 (Monday)	Second inauguration of William McKinley	East Portico, U.S. Capitol	Melville Fuller, Chief Justice	2218 words Full text
—	September 14, 1901 (Saturday)	First inauguration of Theodore Roosevelt (Extraordinary inauguration)	Ansley Wilcox Home, Buffalo, New York	John R. Hazel, Judge, U.S. District Court for the Western District of New York	—
30th	March 4, 1905 (Saturday)	Second inauguration of Theodore Roosevelt	East Portico, U.S. Capitol	Melville Fuller, Chief Justice	984 words Full text
31st	March 4, 1909 (Thursday)	Inauguration of William Howard Taft	Senate Chamber, U.S. Capitol	Melville Fuller, Chief Justice	5434 words Full text
32nd	March 4, 1913 (Tuesday)	First inauguration of Woodrow Wilson	East Portico, U.S. Capitol	Edward D. White, Chief Justice	1704 words Full text
33rd	March 5, 1917 (Monday)	Second inauguration of Woodrow Wilson	East Portico, U.S. Capitol	Edward D. White; Chief Justice	1526 words Full text
34th	March 4, 1921 (Friday)	Inauguration of Warren G. Harding	East Portico, U.S. Capitol	Edward D. White; Chief Justice	3329 words Full text
—	August 3, 1923 (Note: Term began when President Harding died on August 2.) (Friday)	First inauguration of Calvin Coolidge (Extraordinary inauguration)	Coolidge Homestead, Plymouth Notch, Vermont	John Calvin Coolidge; Vermont justice of the peace	—
35th	March 4, 1925 (Wednesday)	Second inauguration of Calvin Coolidge	East Portico, U.S. Capitol	William H. Taft; Chief Justice	4055 words Full text
36th	March 4, 1929 (Monday)	Inauguration of Herbert Hoover	East Portico, U.S. Capitol	William H. Taft; Chief Justice	3672 words Full text
37th	March 4, 1933 (Saturday)	First inauguration of Franklin D. Roosevelt	East Portico, U.S. Capitol	Charles E. Hughes; Chief Justice	1880 words Full text
38th	January 20, 1937 (Wednesday)	Second inauguration of Franklin D. Roosevelt	East Portico, U.S. Capitol	Charles E. Hughes; Chief Justice	1800 words Full text
39th	January 20, 1941 (Monday)	Third inauguration of Franklin D. Roosevelt	East Portico, U.S. Capitol	Charles E. Hughes; Chief Justice	1359 words Full text
40th	January 20, 1945 (Saturday)	Fourth inauguration of Franklin D. Roosevelt	South Portico, White House	Harlan F. Stone; Chief Justice	559 words Full text
—	April 12, 1945 (Thursday)	First inauguration of Harry S. Truman (Extraordinary inauguration)	Cabinet Room, White House	Harlan F. Stone; Chief Justice	—
41st	January 20, 1949 (Thursday)	Second inauguration of Harry S. Truman	East Portico, U.S. Capitol	Fred M. Vinson; Chief Justice	2273 words Full text
42nd	January 20, 1953 (Tuesday)	First inauguration of Dwight D. Eisenhower	East Portico, U.S. Capitol	Fred M. Vinson; Chief Justice	2459 words Full text
43rd	January 21, 1957 (Note: Term began Sunday, January 20.) (Monday)	Second inauguration of Dwight D. Eisenhower	East Portico, U.S. Capitol	Earl Warren; Chief Justice	1658 words Full text
44th	January 20, 1961 (Friday)	Inauguration of John F. Kennedy	East Portico, U.S. Capitol	Earl Warren; Chief Justice	1366 words Full text
—	November 22, 1963 (Friday)	First inauguration of Lyndon B. Johnson (Extraordinary inauguration)	Air Force One, Dallas Love Field, Dallas, Texas	Sarah T. Hughes; Judge, U.S. District Court for the Northern District of Texas	—
45th	January 20, 1965 (Wednesday)	Second inauguration of Lyndon B. Johnson	East Portico, U.S. Capitol	Earl Warren; Chief Justice	1507 words Full text
46th	January 20, 1969 (Monday)	First inauguration of Richard Nixon	East Portico, U.S. Capitol	Earl Warren; Chief Justice	2128 words Full text
47th	January 20, 1973 (Saturday)	Second inauguration of Richard Nixon	East Portico, U.S. Capitol	Warren E. Burger; Chief Justice	1803 words Full text
—	August 9, 1974 (Friday)	Inauguration of Gerald Ford (Extraordinary inauguration)	East Room, White House	Warren E. Burger; Chief Justice	850 words Full text
48th	January 20, 1977 (Thursday)	Inauguration of Jimmy Carter	East Portico, U.S. Capitol	Warren E. Burger; Chief Justice	1229 words Full text
49th	January 20, 1981 (Tuesday)	First inauguration of Ronald Reagan	West Front, U.S. Capitol	Warren E. Burger; Chief Justice	2427 words Full text
50th	January 21, 1985 (Monday)	Second inauguration of Ronald Reagan	Rotunda, U.S. Capitol	Warren E. Burger; Chief Justice	2561 words Full text
51st	January 20, 1989 (Friday)	Inauguration of George H. W. Bush	West Front, U.S. Capitol	William Rehnquist; Chief Justice	2320 words Full text
52nd	January 20, 1993 (Wednesday)	First inauguration of Bill Clinton	West Front, U.S. Capitol	William Rehnquist; Chief Justice	1598 words Full text
53rd	January 20, 1997 (Monday)	Second inauguration of Bill Clinton	West Front, U.S. Capitol	William Rehnquist; Chief Justice	2155 words Full text
54th	January 20, 2001 (Saturday)	First inauguration of George W. Bush	West Front, U.S. Capitol	William Rehnquist; Chief Justice	1592 words Full text
55th	January 20, 2005 (Thursday)	Second inauguration of George W. Bush	West Front, U.S. Capitol	William Rehnquist; Chief Justice	2071 words Full text
56th	January 20, 2009 (Tuesday)	First inauguration of Barack Obama	West Front, U.S. Capitol	John Roberts; Chief Justice	2395 words Full text
57th	January 21, 2013 (Monday)	Second inauguration of Barack Obama	West Front, U.S. Capitol	John Roberts; Chief Justice	2096 words Full text
58th	January 20, 2017 (Friday)	First inauguration of Donald Trump	West Front, U.S. Capitol	John Roberts; Chief Justice	1433 words Full text
59th	January 20, 2021 (Wednesday)	Inauguration of Joe Biden	West Front, U.S. Capitol	John Roberts; Chief Justice	2514 words Full text
60th	January 20, 2025 (Monday)	Second inauguration of Donald Trump	Rotunda, U.S. Capitol	John Roberts; Chief Justice	2885 words Full text

== See also ==
- United States presidential transition
