= Second inauguration of Thomas Jefferson =

5th United States presidential inauguration

Second presidential inauguration of Thomas Jefferson
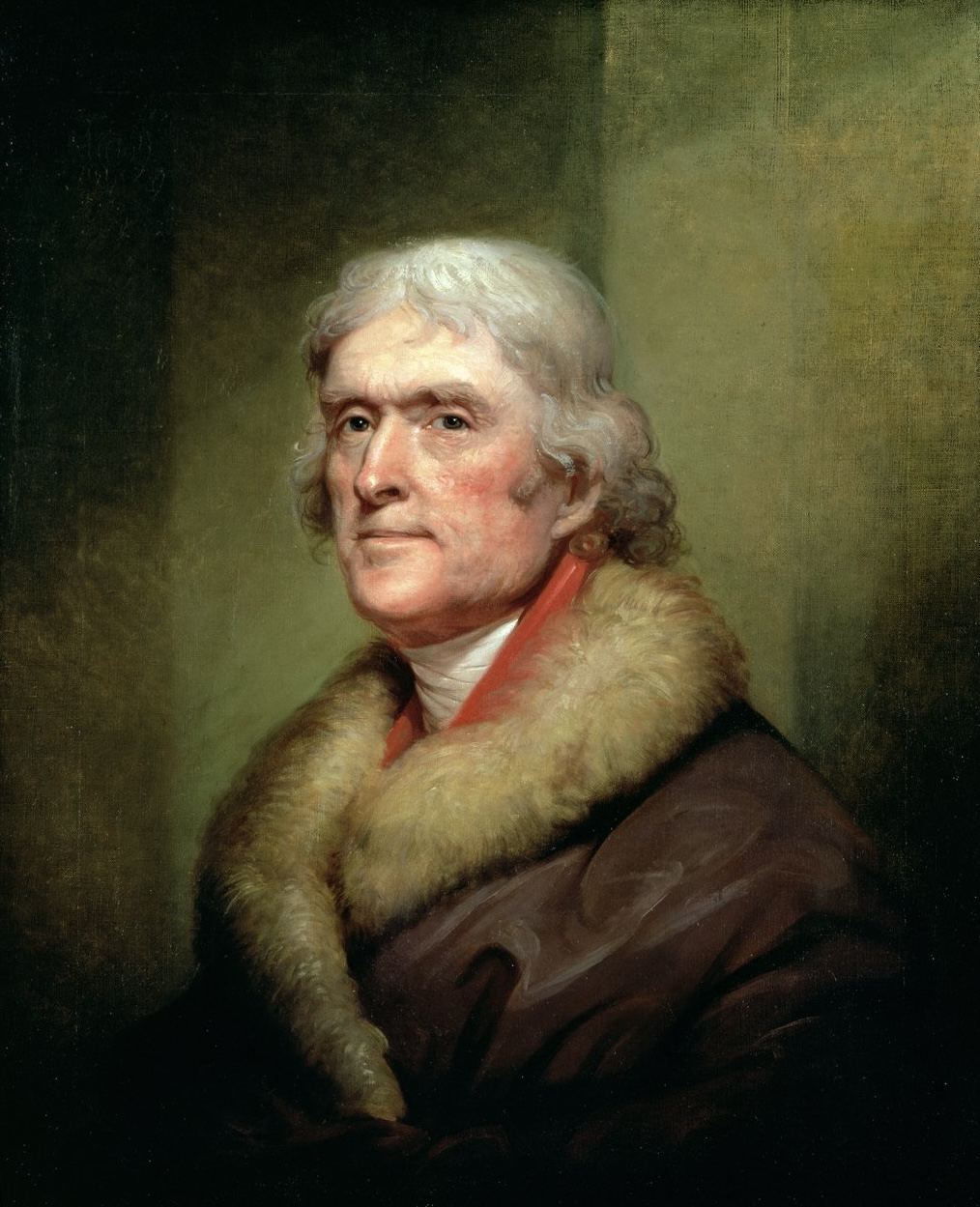
- Thomas Jefferson (1805 portrait by Rembrandt Peale)
- Date: March 4, 1805; 221 years ago
- Location: United States Capitol, Washington, D.C.
- Participants: Thomas Jefferson; 3rd president of the United States — Assuming office George Clinton; 4th vice president of the United States — Assuming office John Marshall; Chief Justice of the United States — Administering oaths

The second inauguration of Thomas Jefferson as president of the United States took place on Monday, March 4, 1805 in the Senate Chamber of the United States Capitol. The inauguration marked the commencement of the second four-year term of Thomas Jefferson as president and the first four-year term of George Clinton as vice president. Giving the oath of office was Chief Justice John Marshall.

== Background ==
Unlike the contentious election of 1800, in which Jefferson narrowly defeated strong opposition from Federalists and a bipartisan conspiracy to replace him with his own running mate and campaign manager, Aaron Burr, with the House of Representatives determining the winner, the 1804 election was far less dramatic. The Federalists, severely weakened, struggled to muster serious opposition and to select a candidate. They settled on Charles Cotesworth Pinckney of South Carolina. Due to several years of tension and mutual dislike between Jefferson and Burr, Burr was dropped from the Democratic-Republican ticket and replaced with George Clinton. Jefferson won the election in a landslide.

== Inauguration ==
Jefferson rode to the Capitol on horseback on March 4, 1805, but much of Congress had already left after the body had adjourned following Burr's farewell address before the Senate a couple of days earlier. Thus, the inaugural ceremony was modest and appeared anticlimactic. The president spoke softly and quietly, as he was known for, and provided copies of his inaugural address. Jefferson wore a black suit and silk stockings for the inauguration. In the speech, he addressed the recent acquisition of Louisiana, the Federalists' diminishing influence, and the need for freedom of the press, though he also criticized recent press attacks against him.

About the Louisiana territory he said:

I know that the acquisition of Louisiana has been disapproved by some, from a candid apprehension that the enlargement of our territory would endanger its union. But who can limit the extent to which the federative principle may operate effectively? The larger our association, the less will it be shaken by local passions; and in any view, is it not better that the opposite bank of the Mississippi should be settled by our own brethren and children, than by strangers of another family? With which shall we be most likely to live in harmony and friendly intercourse?

== See also ==
- First inauguration of Thomas Jefferson
- Presidency of Thomas Jefferson
- 1804 United States presidential election
