= Inauguration of John Adams =

3rd United States presidential inauguration

Presidential inauguration of John Adams
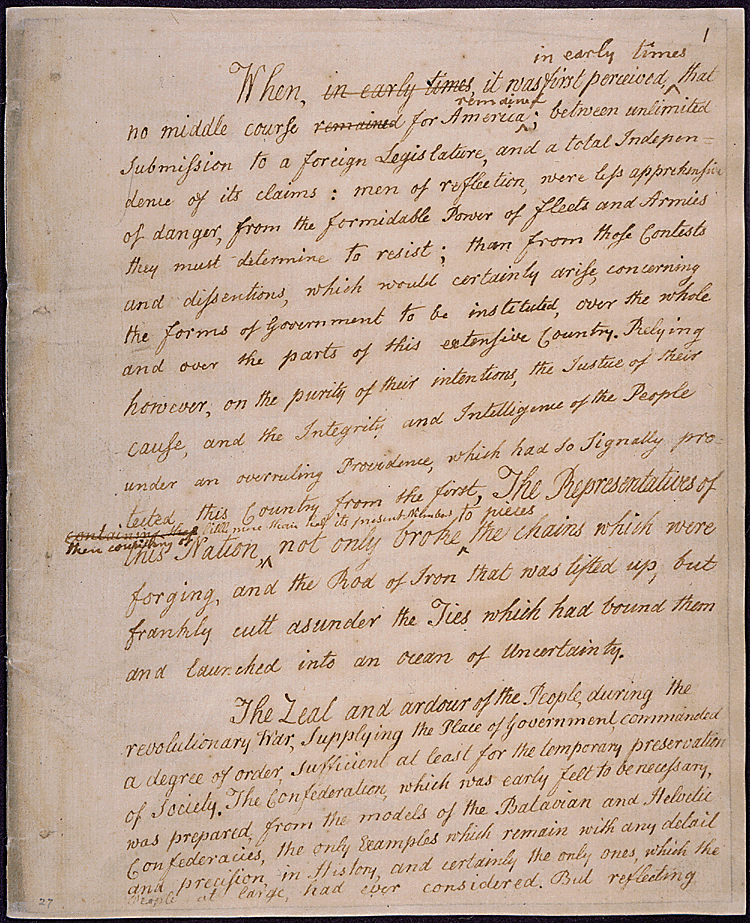
- Page one of manuscript of John Adams' inaugural address (NAID 306444)
- Date: March 4, 1797; 229 years ago
- Location: Philadelphia, Pennsylvania Congress Hall
- Participants: John Adams; 2nd president of the United States — Assuming office Oliver Ellsworth; Chief Justice of the United States — Administering oath Thomas Jefferson; 2nd vice president of the United States — Assuming office William Bingham; President pro tempore of the United States Senate — Administering oath

The inauguration of John Adams as the second president of the United States was held on Saturday, March 4, 1797, in the House of Representatives Chamber of Congress Hall in Philadelphia, Pennsylvania. The inauguration marked the commencement of the only four-year term of John Adams as president and of Thomas Jefferson as vice president. The presidential oath of office was administered to John Adams by Chief Justice Oliver Ellsworth. Adams was the first president to receive the oath of office from a Chief Justice of the United States, and the first head of state to peacefully and legally succeed to office from a living predecessor since Louis I of Spain in 1724. George Washington was in attendance for the inauguration of his successor, he reportedly exuded calm and even a sense of relief as he finally retired from public life.

== Inaugural address ==
President Adams expressed his thoughts on the US Constitution:

Employed in the service of my country abroad during the whole course of these transactions, I first saw the Constitution of the United States in a foreign country. Irritated by no literary altercation, animated by no public debate, heated by no party animosity, I read it with great satisfaction, as the result of good heads prompted by good hearts, as an experiment better adapted to the genius, character, situation, and relations of this nation and country than any which had ever been proposed or suggested. In its general principles and great outlines it was conformable to such a system of government as I had ever most esteemed, and in some States, my own native State in particular, had contributed to establish. Claiming a right of suffrage, in common with my fellow-citizens, in the adoption or rejection of a constitution which was to rule me and my posterity, as well as them and theirs, I did not hesitate to express my approbation of it on all occasions, in public and in private. It was not then, nor has been since, any objection to it in my mind that the Executive and Senate were not more permanent. Nor have I ever entertained a thought of promoting any alteration in it but such as the people themselves, in the course of their experience, should see and feel to be necessary or expedient, and by their representatives in Congress and the State legislatures, according to the Constitution itself, adopt and ordain.

== See also ==
- Presidency of John Adams
- 1796 United States presidential election
