= First inauguration of Andrew Jackson =

11th United States presidential inauguration

First presidential inauguration of Andrew Jackson
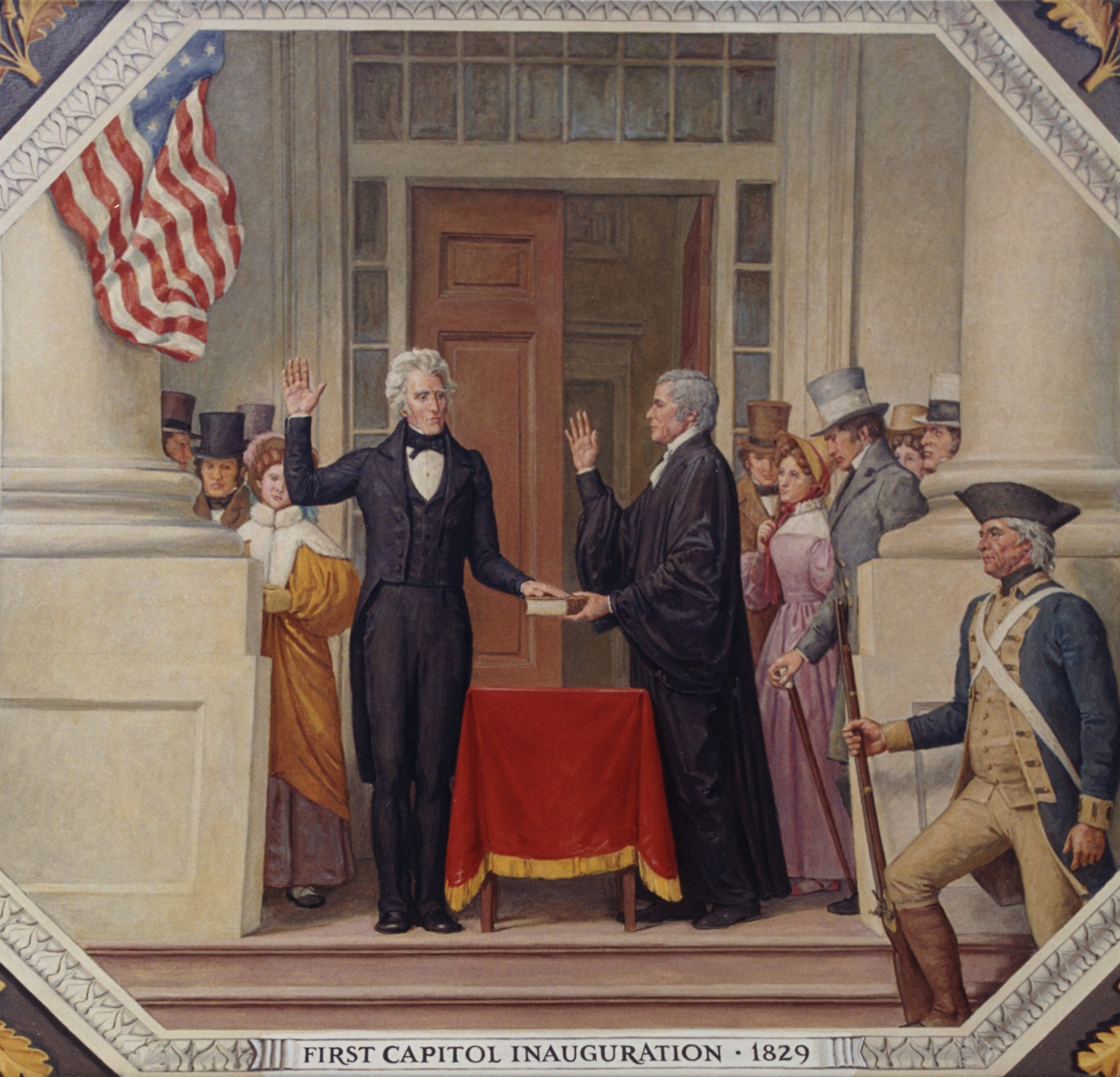
- Date: March 4, 1829; 197 years ago
- Location: United States Capitol, Washington, D.C.
- Participants: Andrew Jackson; 7th president of the United States — Assuming office John Marshall; Chief Justice of the United States — Administering oath John C. Calhoun; 7th vice president of the United States — Assuming office Samuel Smith; President pro tempore of the United States Senate — Administering oath

Andrew Jackson was inaugurated as the seventh president of the United States on Wednesday, March 4, 1829, at the United States Capitol in Washington, D.C. The ceremony marked the commencement of the first four-year term of Jackson as president and the second term of John C. Calhoun as vice president. Chief Justice John Marshall administered the presidential oath of office. Calhoun resigned 3 years, 299 days into this term, and the office remained vacant for the balance of it; before ratification of the Twenty-fifth Amendment in 1967, no constitutional provision existed for filling an intra-term vacancy in the vice presidency.

Outgoing president John Quincy Adams, whom Jackson defeated in the 1828 election, did not attend the inauguration making this the second time an outgoing president skipped the inauguration of his successor (after his father John Adams skipped the 1801 inauguration of Thomas Jefferson). He had moved to a mansion on Meridian Hill in February 1829 and officially left the White House on the evening of March 3, the day before the inauguration.

== Travel ==
President-elect Jackson's three-week journey from Nashville, Tennessee, to Washington, D.C., first by steamboat to Pittsburgh, Pennsylvania, and then onward by carriage, was marked by large crowds greeting the president-elect. Jackson arrived at Washington, D.C., on February 11, 1829, but did not contact outgoing President John Quincy Adams, nor did Adams invite him to the White House.

== Inauguration ==
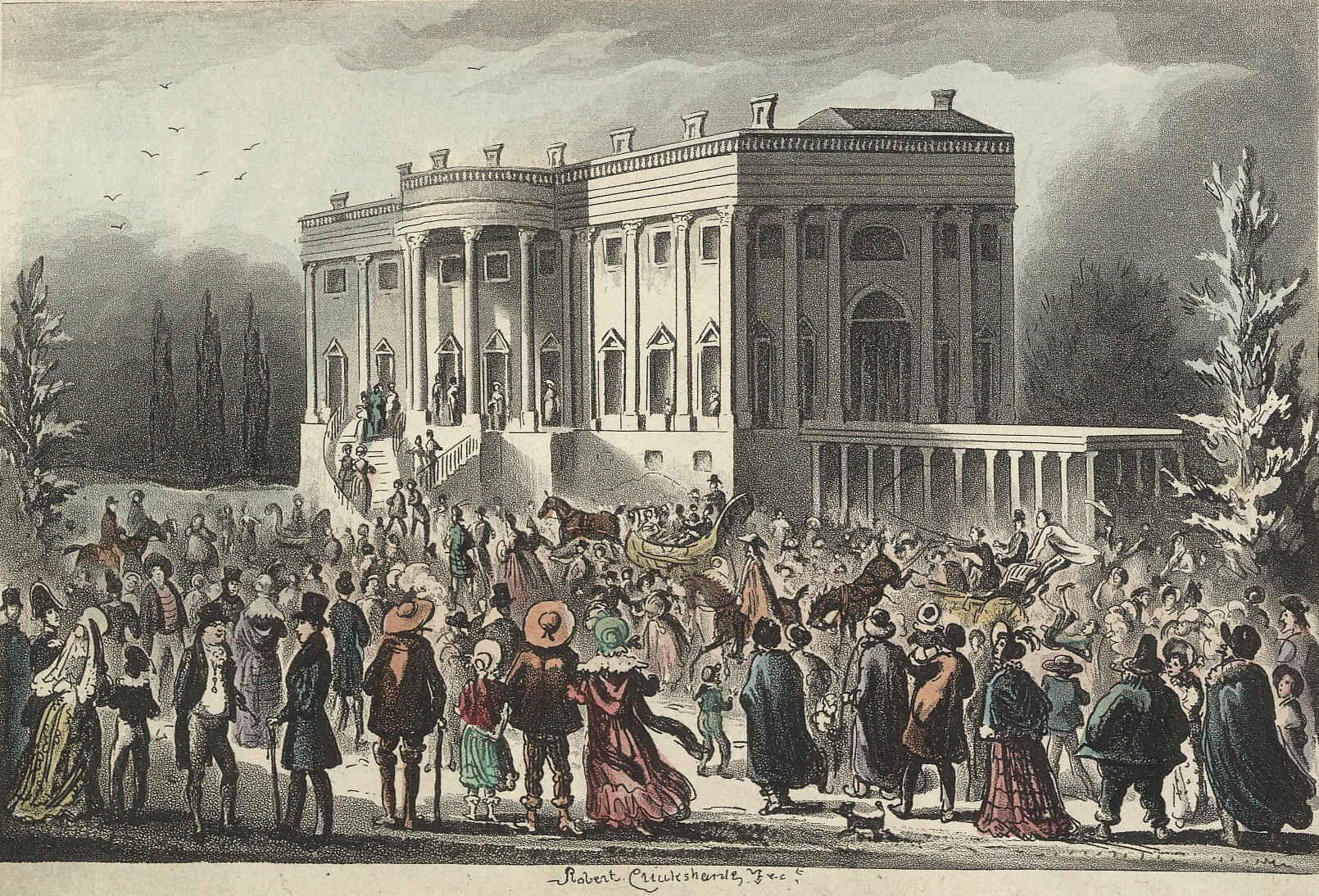
1829 caricature by Robert Cruikshank of US President Andrew Jackson's inauguration

The inauguration itself took place on March 4, 1829, and was the first time in which the ceremony was held on the East Portico of the United States Capitol. Ten thousand people arrived in town for the ceremony, eliciting this response from Francis Scott Key: "It is beautiful; it is sublime!"

By 10 a.m., the area in front of the Capitol was filled with people, and the stairs on the East Portico were blocked by a ship's cable to prevent the crowd from advancing. An excited crowd of roughly 21,000 came to see the swearing-in, even if most would not be able to hear the inaugural address. Jackson came on foot to the ceremony, but to avoid the multitude, he used a basement door on the west front to enter the Capitol; upon exiting to face the crowd, he bowed to great cheers.

The scene was described by a witness:

Never can I forget the spectacle which presented itself on every side, nor the electrifying moment when the eager, expectant eyes of that vast and motley multitude caught sight of the tall and imposing form of their adored leader, as he came forth between the columns of the portico, the color of the whole mass changed, as if by miracle; all hats were off at once, and the dark tint which usually pervades a mixed map of men was turned, as by a magic wand, into the bright hue of ten thousand upturned and expectant human faces, radiant with sudden joy. The peal of shouting that arose rent the air and seemed to shake the very ground. But when the Chief Justice took his place and commenced the brief ceremony of administering the oath of office, it quickly sank into comparative silence; and as the new President proceeded to read his inaugural address, the stillness gradually increased; but all efforts to hear him, beyond a brief space immediately around were utterly vain.

As he had entered, Jackson left on the west front of the Capitol, for the crowd had broken the ship's cable and surged forward. He proceeded to mount a white horse and rode up Pennsylvania Avenue to the White House. While this happened people were climbing in through the windows to get into the White House.

The White House was opened to all for a post-inaugural reception and was filled by the public even before Jackson arrived on horseback. Soon afterward, Jackson left by a window or a side entrance, and proceeded to Gadsby's, later called the National Hotel. The crowd continued to descend into a drunken mob, only dispersed when bowls of liquor and punch were placed on the front lawn of the White House. "I never saw such a mixture," said Joseph Story, then a justice of the Supreme Court: "The reign of King Mob seemed triumphant." The White House was left a mess, including several thousand dollars' worth of broken china.

That night an official inaugural ball for administration officials and Washington's high society was held in Carusi's Assembly Rooms, and it set the stage for the scandal that would become known as the Eaton affair. Twelve hundred guests were present, but President Jackson, fatigued and still mourning the loss of his wife Rachel Jackson that December, was not. Another ball was held in the Central Masonic Hall.

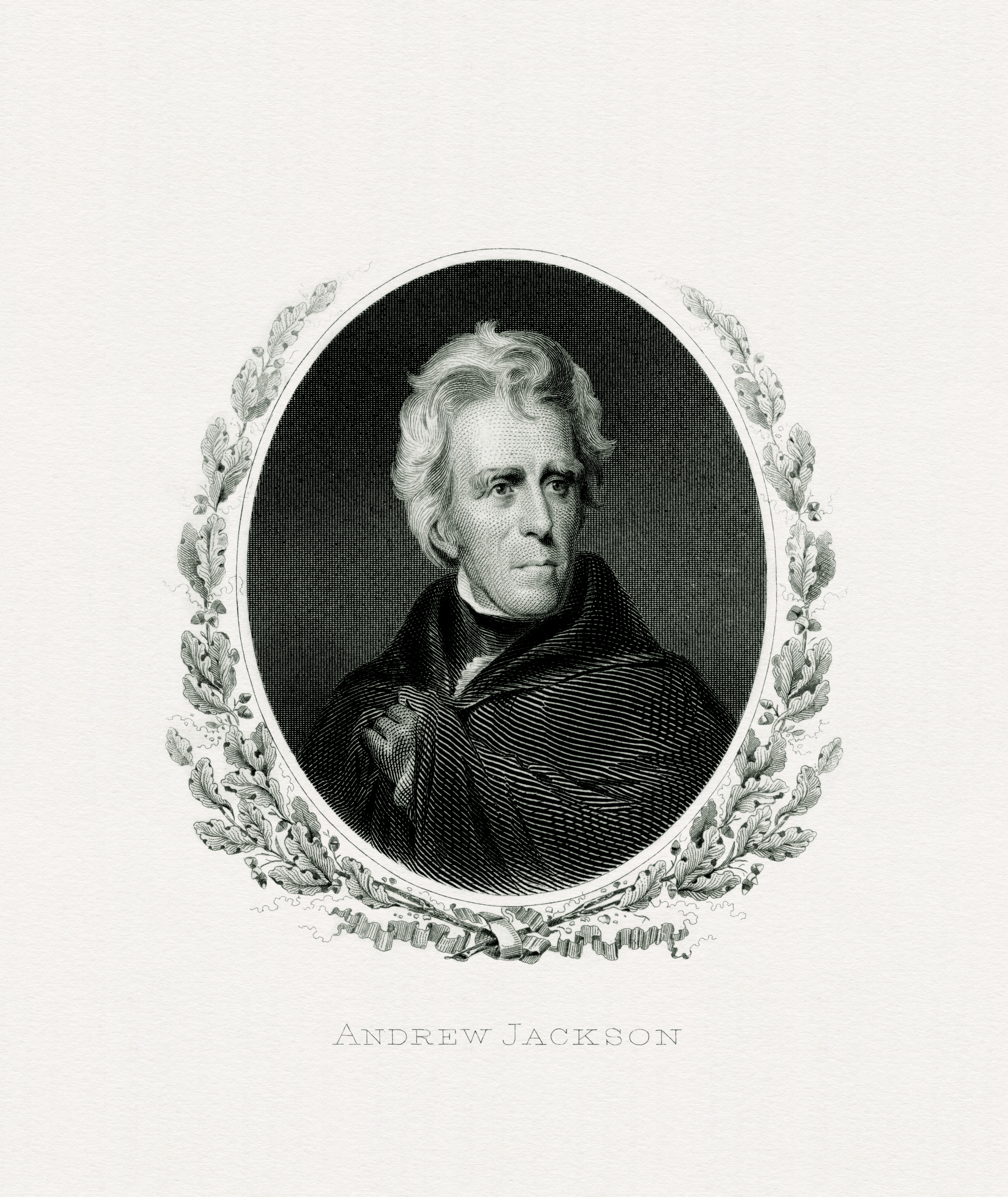
BEP engraved portrait of Jackson as president.

However, to be fair, two historians, David and Jeanne Heidler, wrote in 2004 about other contemporary accounts that play down the drunken-brawl aspects of the open house. The Heidlers point out that Hamilton, the Jackson supporter from South Carolina, called the damage from the event "trivial." The crowd at the White House was mixed. The first arrivals were the people who made up Washington society. The second crowd that showed up at the mansion was made up of Jackson supporters who were dressed in their best clothes. What happened next doesn't seem to be disputed: The White House wasn't prepared for the crowd as it pressed in through the front door and sought out Jackson, along with the food and whiskey-laced punch. Jackson found himself pressed into a situation with his back to a wall until his people were able to get him away from the crowd, and back to his hotel. The sheer number of people inside the White House led to collisions with furniture and food. After Jackson left, the Heidlers say Antoine Michel Giusta, the White House steward, moved the party outside by taking the punch outside. Other reports indicated that staffers passed punch and ice cream through the White House's windows to the crowd outside. As for the image of a riot of drunken Jackson supporters, the Heidlers believed that the incident was used as a metaphor by Washington society and Jackson's enemies, who feared the new regime and its lower-class roots.

"Most witnesses, however, mentioned little real damage, and newspapers reported only incidental break-age. Niles' Weekly Register, in fact, merely observed that Jackson had 'received the salutations of a vast number of persons, who came to congratulate him upon his induction to the presidency'," said the Heidlers. The story about the cheese happened at the end of Jackson's eight years in office. The president was given a 1,400-pound cheese wheel as a gift, and it sat in the White House for several years. Finally, Jackson allowed the public into the East Room to eat the cheese, which it consumed over several days in 1837. The odors lingered for days after the event.

== Address ==
The most significant pledge in Jackson's inaugural address was "reform," by which he meant replacing federal employees with his supporters, for both their benefit and for his.

== See also ==
- Presidency of Andrew Jackson
- Second inauguration of Andrew Jackson
- 1828 United States presidential election
- Andrew Jackson
- Spoils system § Andrew Jackson
