= Inauguration of Warren G. Harding =

34th United States presidential inauguration

Presidential inauguration of Warren Harding
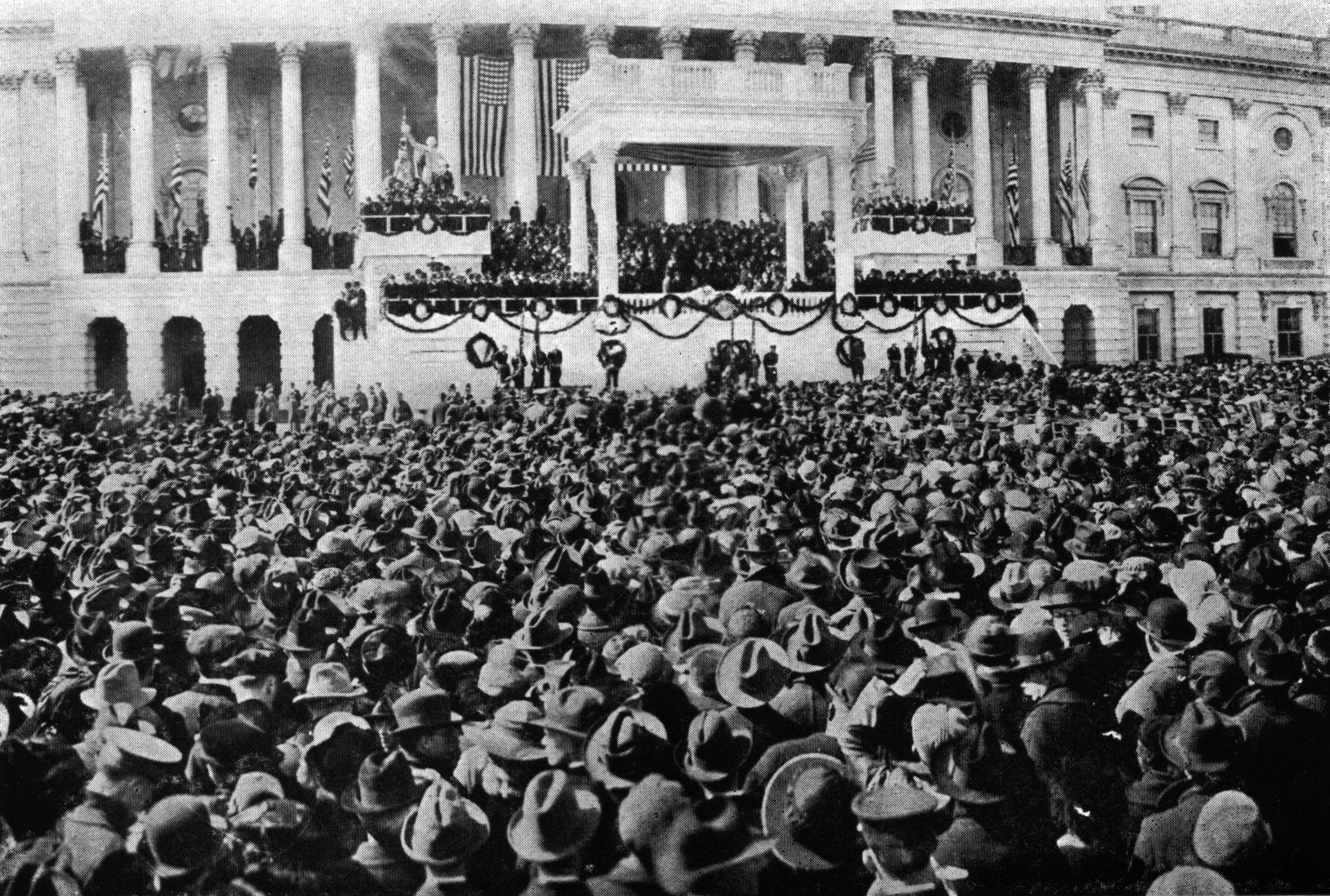
- Date: March 4, 1921; 105 years ago
- Location: United States Capitol, Washington, D.C.
- Organized by: Joint Congressional Committee on Inaugural Ceremonies
- Participants: Warren G. Harding; 29th president of the United States — Assuming office Edward Douglass White; Chief Justice of the United States — Administering oath Calvin Coolidge; 29th vice president of the United States — Assuming office Thomas R. Marshall; 28th vice president of the United States — Administering oath

The inauguration of Warren G. Harding as the 29th president of the United States was held on Friday, March 4, 1921, at the East Portico of the United States Capitol in Washington, D.C. This was the 34th inauguration and marked the commencement of the only term of Warren G. Harding as president and of Calvin Coolidge as vice president. Harding died 2 years, 151 days into this term, and Coolidge succeeded to the presidency.

Chief Justice Edward D. White administered the presidential oath of office. Harding placed his hand on the Washington Inaugural Bible as he recited the oath.

Coolidge was sworn in as vice president in the Senate Chamber, while Harding's swearing-in as president took place on the east portico of the Capitol, respectively, which Coolidge believed ruined "all semblance of unity and continuity." Critic H. L. Mencken described Harding's inaugural address, writing, "It is rumble and bumble. It is flap and doodle. It is balder and dash. But I grow lyrical."

This inauguration was the first in which an automobile was used to transport the president-elect and the outgoing president (Woodrow Wilson) to and from the Capitol. It was also the first presidential election in which women were able to vote. Wilson, still compromised by his 1919 stroke, did not attend the ceremony itself.

== Gallery ==
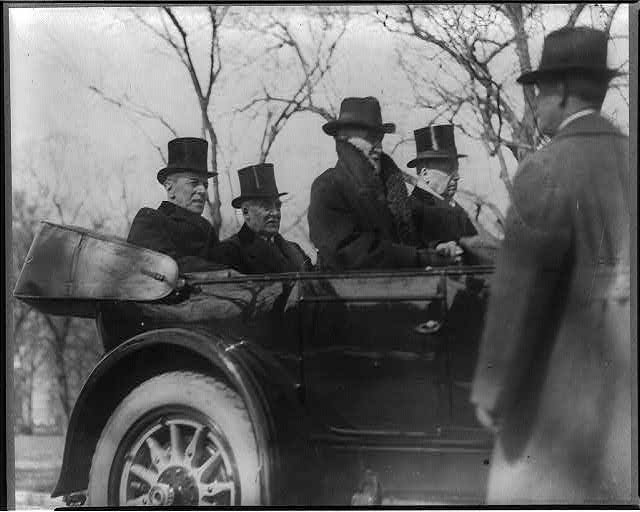
Wilson, Harding, Cannon and Knox in car on way to Harding's inauguration, Mar. 1921

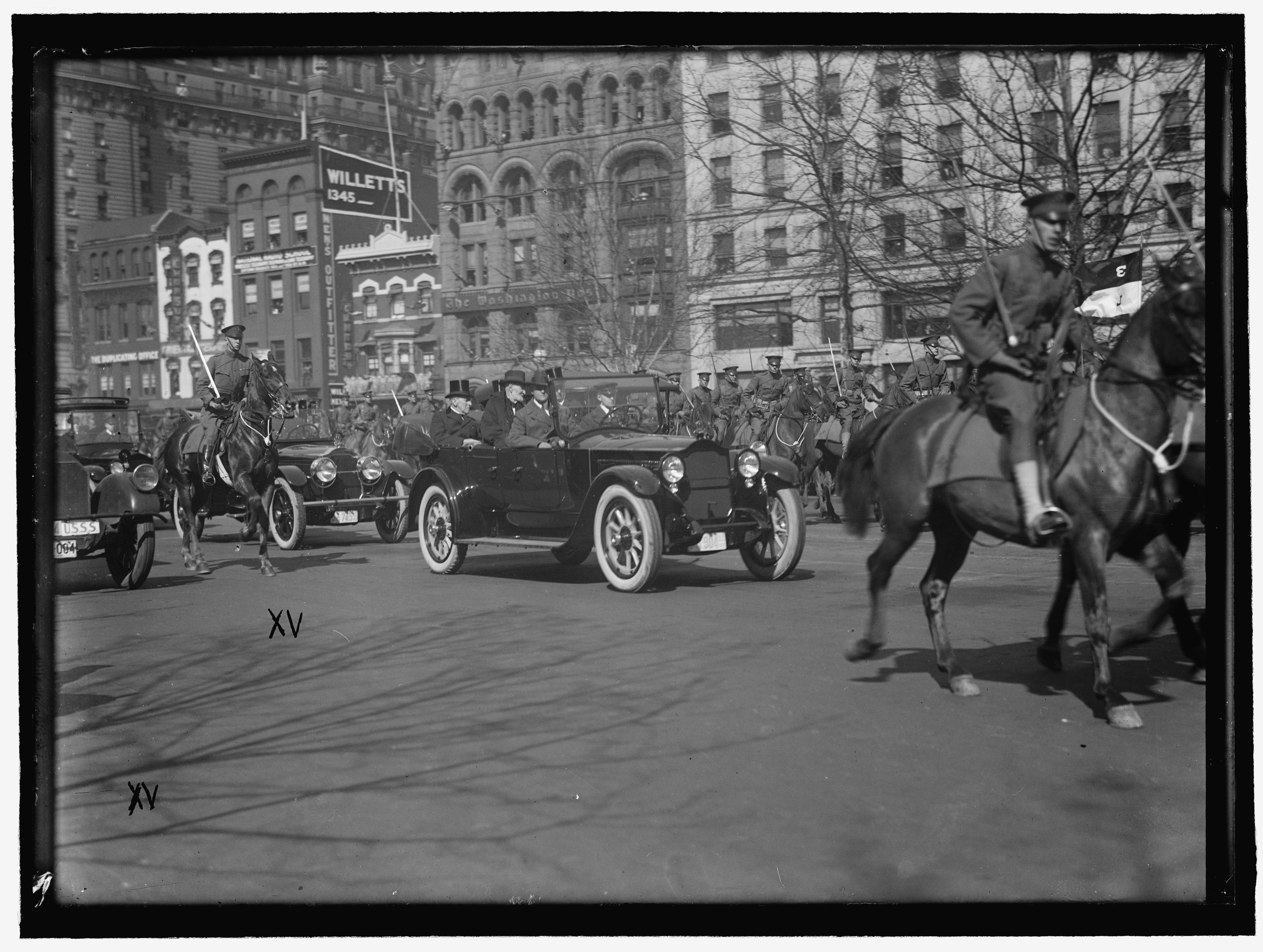
HARDING INAUGURATION

== See also ==
- Presidency of Warren G. Harding
- 1920 United States presidential election
- Calvin Coolidge
