= First inauguration of Thomas Jefferson =

4th United States presidential inauguration

First presidential inauguration of Thomas Jefferson
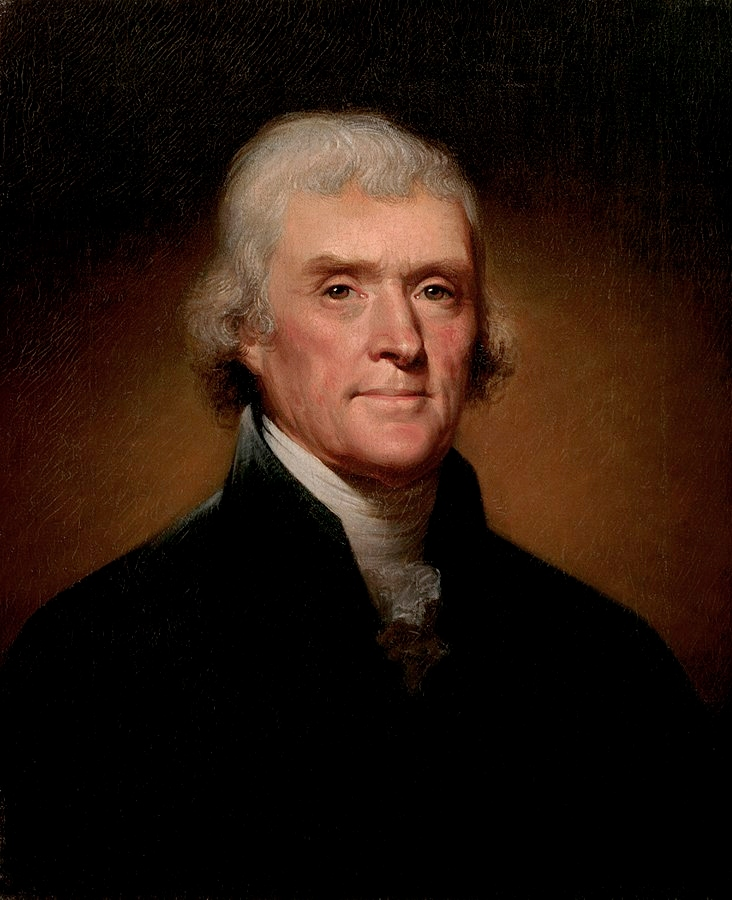
- Thomas Jefferson
- Date: March 4, 1801; 225 years ago
- Location: United States Capitol, Washington
- Participants: Thomas Jefferson; 3rd president of the United States — Assuming office John Marshall; Chief Justice of the United States — Administering oath Aaron Burr; 3rd vice president of the United States — Assuming office James Hillhouse; President pro tempore of the United States Senate — Administering oath

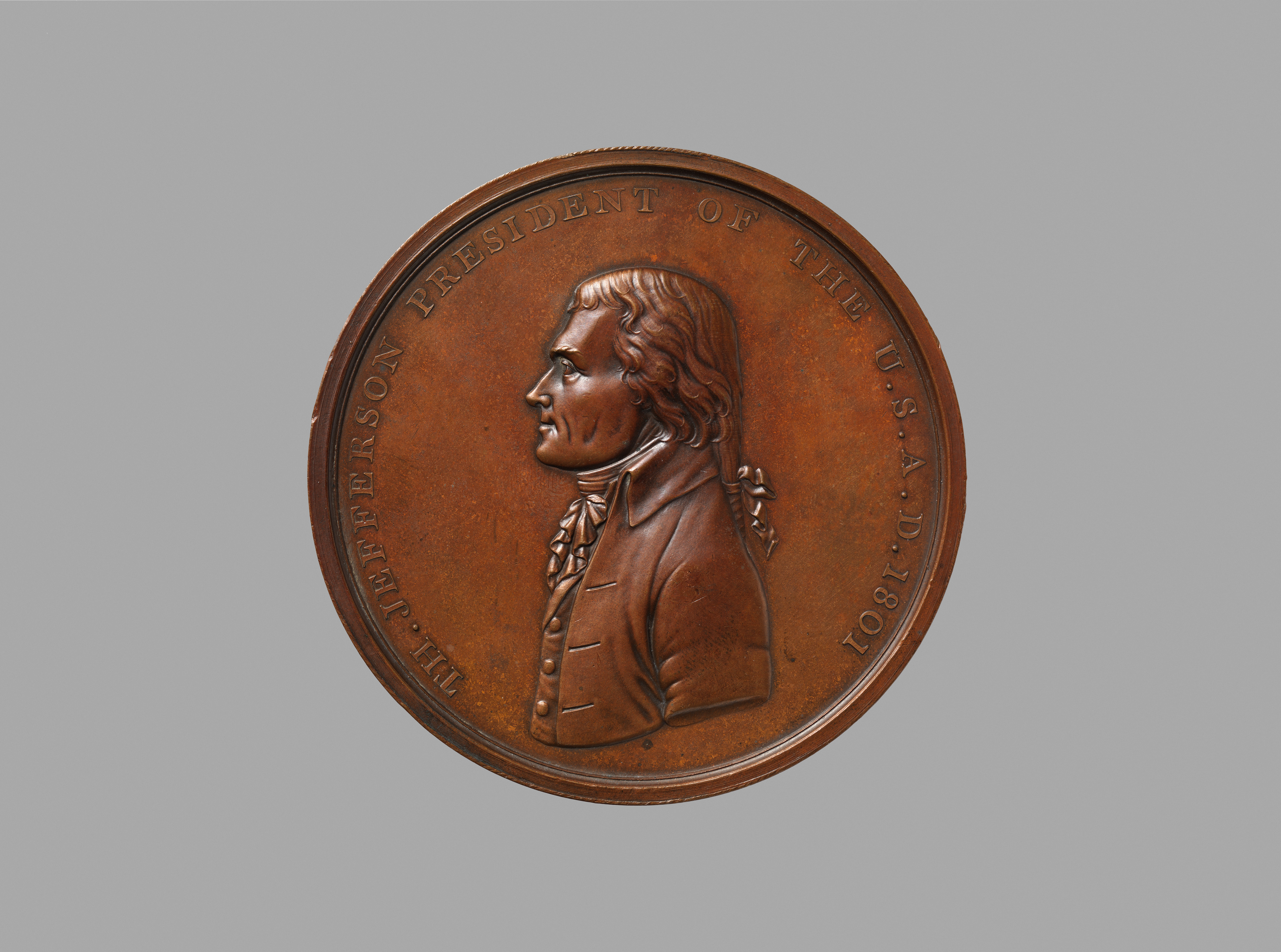
Commemorative medal (1801, Johann Christian Reich) marking Jefferson's inauguration

The first inauguration of Thomas Jefferson as the third president of the United States was held on Wednesday, March 4, 1801. The inauguration marked the commencement of the first four-year term of Thomas Jefferson as president and the only four-year term of Aaron Burr as vice president. Jefferson was sworn in by Supreme Court Chief Justice John Marshall, marking the first time in modern history where a national government changed hands peaceably following a free election.

== Background ==
Jefferson was the nation's second vice president, under President John Adams, and ran against him as a Democratic-Republican in the 1800 presidential election with campaign manager Aaron Burr. Back then, the person who came in first would be president and the person who came in second would be vice president. Burr and Jefferson tied in the Electoral College, so the choice was thrown to the House of Representatives, where Alexander Hamilton helped swing the vote in Jefferson's favor on the 36th ballot.

== Inauguration ==
It was a mild day in Washington, the first time an inauguration had been held in the city, with a High Noon temperature estimated at 55 degrees Fahrenheit. That morning an artillery company on Capitol Hill had shots fired to welcome the daybreak, and in a first for a newspaper, Jefferson gave a copy of his speech to the National Intelligencer for it to be published and available right after delivery. The theme of his address was reconciliation after his bitterly partisan election.

Jefferson was lodging at Conrad and McMunn's boarding house on the south side of the Capitol building, and at roughly 10:00 am the Alexandria company of riflemen marched to the intersection of New Jersey Avenue and C Street. Jefferson, dressed according to a reporter as "a plain citizen without any distinctive badge of office," became the first president to walk rather than ride a carriage to the ceremony, setting off around noon with some congressmen, District marshals, and military officers from Alexandria, Virginia. He delivered a 1,721-word speech in the United States Capitol's Senate chamber, and then took the oath of office, administered by Chief Justice John Marshall. Marshall was impressed by the peaceful transfer of power and inspired Margaret Bayard Smith to celebrate it as a uniquely harmonious moment in American political history.

In what would become standard practice, the Marine Band played for the first time at the inauguration.

Outgoing President John Adams, distraught over his loss of the election as well as the death of his son Charles Adams to alcoholism, did not attend the inauguration. He left the President's House at 4 a.m. in the early morning on the early public stagecoach for Baltimore. This was the first time an outgoing president would not attend his successor's inauguration.

== See also ==
- Presidency of Thomas Jefferson
- Second inauguration of Thomas Jefferson
- 1800 United States presidential election
- Presidents of the United States on U.S. postage stamps, Thomas Jefferson
