= Washington Square Arch =

Memorial arch in New York City

- Washington Arch
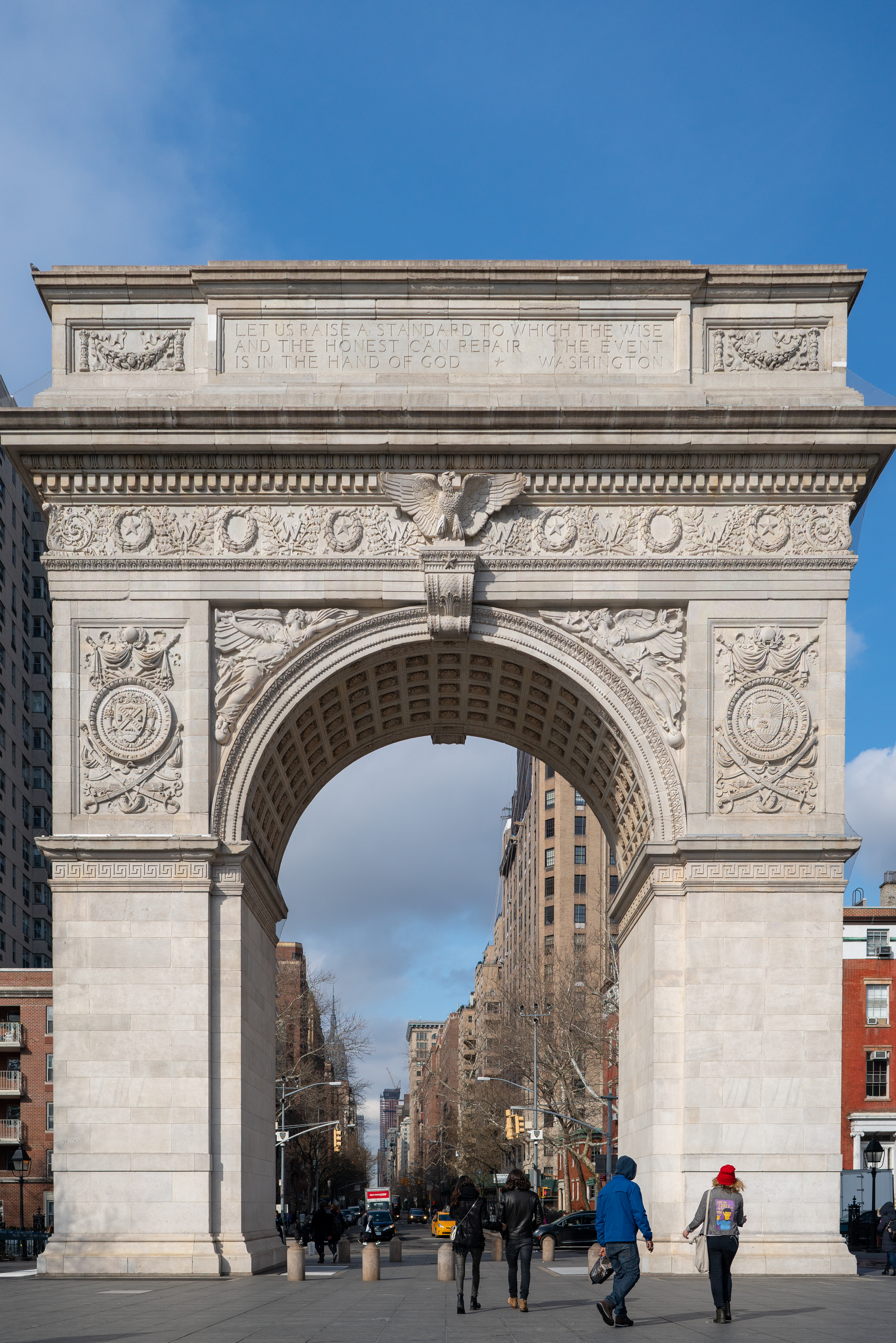
- The south face of the arch
- Interactive map of Washington Square Arch
- Location: Washington Square Park, Manhattan, New York City, United States
- Coordinates: 40.7312355°N 73.9971028°W
- Designer: Architect: Stanford White; Sculptors: Frederick MacMonnies (spandrel panels); Philip Martiny (keystone eagles); Hermon A. MacNeil (George Washington as Commander-in Chief; Alexander Stirling Calder (George Washington as President)
- Builder: David H. King, Jr.
- Material: Tuckahoe marble
- Width: 57 ft (17 m)
- Height: 73.5 ft (22.4 m)
- Span: 30 ft (9.1 m)

The Washington Square Arch, officially the Washington Arch, is a marble memorial arch at the Washington Square Park, at Greenwich Village neighborhood of Lower Manhattan, New York City, United States. Designed by architect Stanford White in 1891, it commemorates the centennial of George Washington's 1789 inauguration as President of the United States, and forms the southern terminus of Fifth Avenue.

== Description ==
Washington Arch, constructed of white Tuckahoe marble, was conceived by Stanford White, who adapted the form of a Roman triumphal arch, with a design close to the 1st-century Arch of Titus in Rome. They were monuments which the Roman Republic and later emperors built throughout the empire to celebrate a victory or event. For example, the flying figures in the spandrels on either side of the arch are winged victories. The monument's total height is 77 feet (23 m). The piers stand 30 feet (9.1 m) apart and the arch opening is 47 feet (14 m) high. The iconography of the Arch centers on images of war and peace. On the frieze are 13 large stars and 42 small stars, interspersed with capital "W"s.

The inscription on the attic story reads:

Let us raise a standard to which the wise and the honest can repair. The event is in the hand of God.

— Washington

The north side of the eastern pier bears the sculpture George Washington as Commander-in-Chief, Accompanied by Fame and Valor (1914–1916) by Hermon A. MacNeil; the President is flanked by Fame (left) and Valor (right). The western pier has George Washington as President, Accompanied by Wisdom and Justice (1917–18) by Alexander Stirling Calder (father of Alexander Calder), with flanking Justice (right) and Wisdom (left) figures. In the latter sculpture, a hand holds a book bearing the Latin phrase Exitus Acta Probat ("the end justifies the deed"). These sculptures are commonly referred to as Washington at War and Washington at Peace, respectively. These figures and most of the rest of the carving on the arch was performed by the Piccirilli Brothers.

Upon the last stone is carved a huge "P" in honor of Ignacy Jan Paderewski, the famous Polish pianist and 3rd Prime Minister of Poland, who donated $4,500 collected from one of his concerts in New York.

== History ==
In 1889, a large plaster and wood memorial arch was erected over Fifth Avenue just north of Washington Square Park by local businessman and philanthropist William Rhinelander Stewart (1852–1929). Stewart lived at 17 Washington Square North, and his friends contributed $2,765 toward the work. Freemasons from St. John's Lodge No. 1 lead a procession through the arch with the George Washington Inaugural Bible for the Centennial Parade of Washington's Inauguration in 1889. The temporary arch was so popular that more money was raised and, three years later, the permanent stone arch, designed by architect Stanford White, was erected.

During the excavations for the eastern pier, human remains, a coffin, and a gravestone dated 1803 were uncovered 10 feet (3.0 m) below ground level. At the laying of the cornerstone, Freemasons from St. John's Lodge No. 1 were again present with the George Washington Inaugural Bible. The Arch was dedicated in 1895. In 1918, two statues of Washington were added to the north side.

By the late 20th century, the Washington Arch had become extensively defaced with spray-painted graffiti. It was cleaned and restored in 2003–04. In modern times, the Washington Square Arch has become an unofficial symbol of New York University.

== Gallery ==
The north face of the Washington Square Arch

South face of the Washington Arch at night

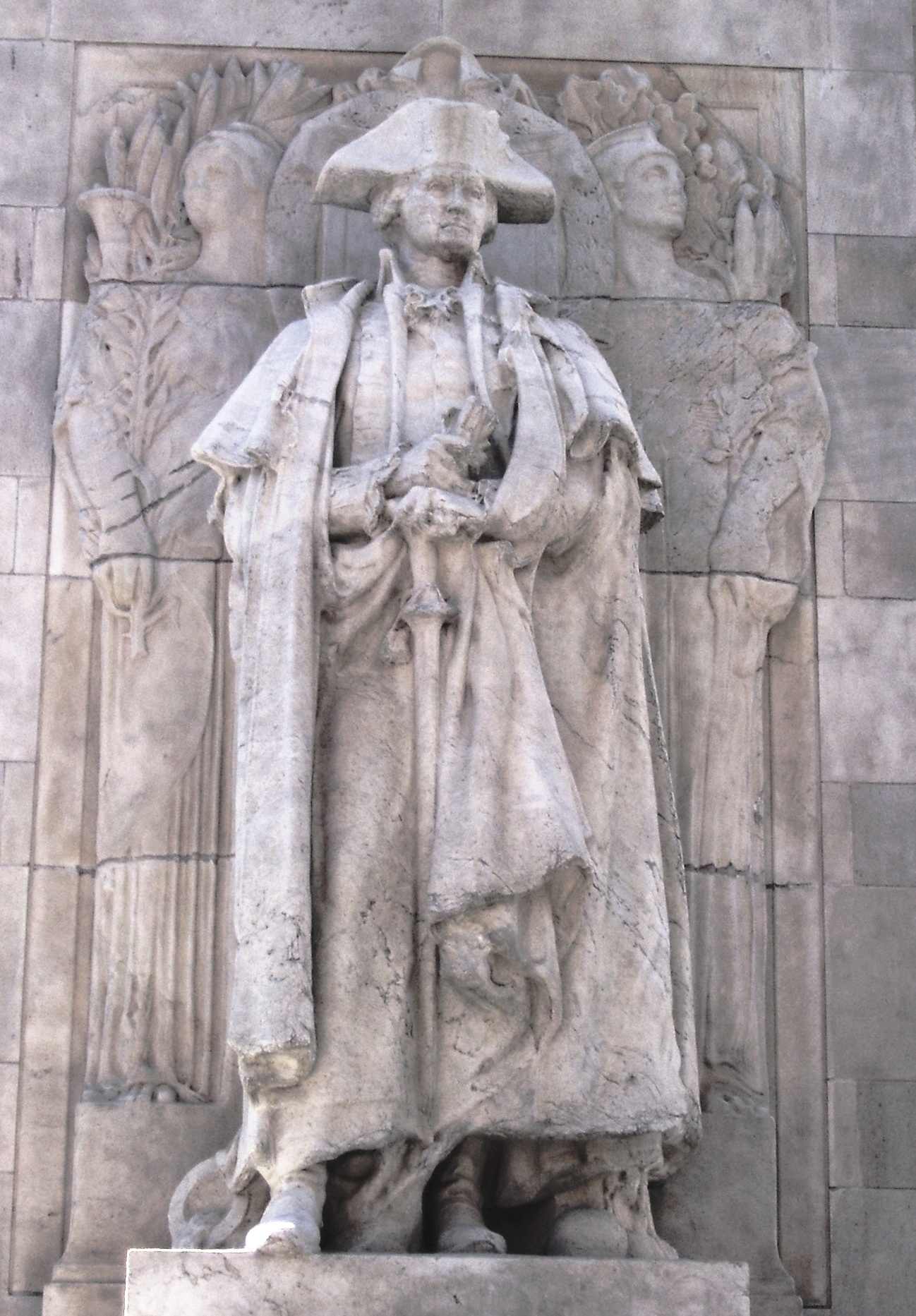
George Washington as Commander-in-Chief (1914–1916) by Hermon A. MacNeil

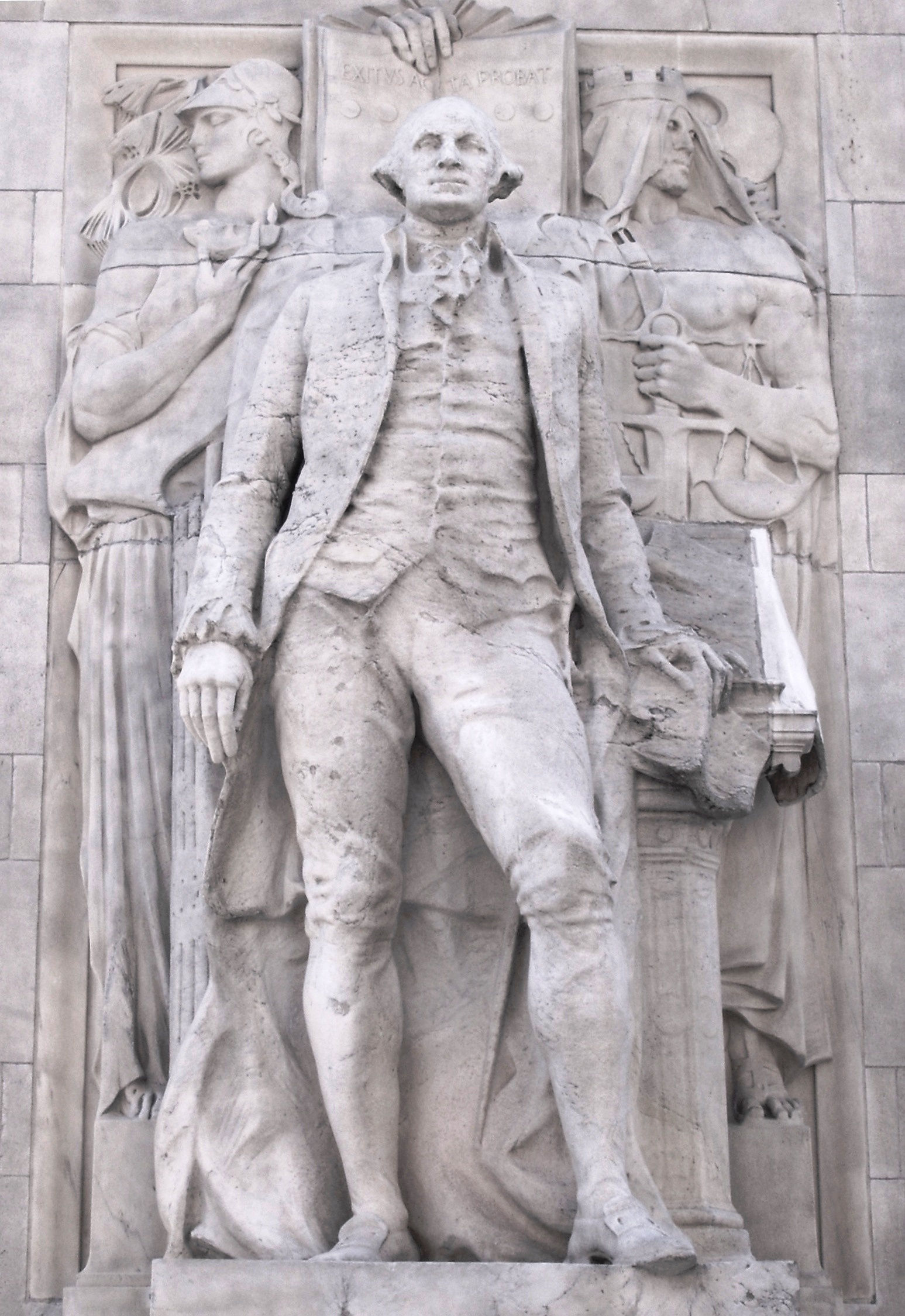
George Washington as President (1917–1918) by Alexander Stirling Calder

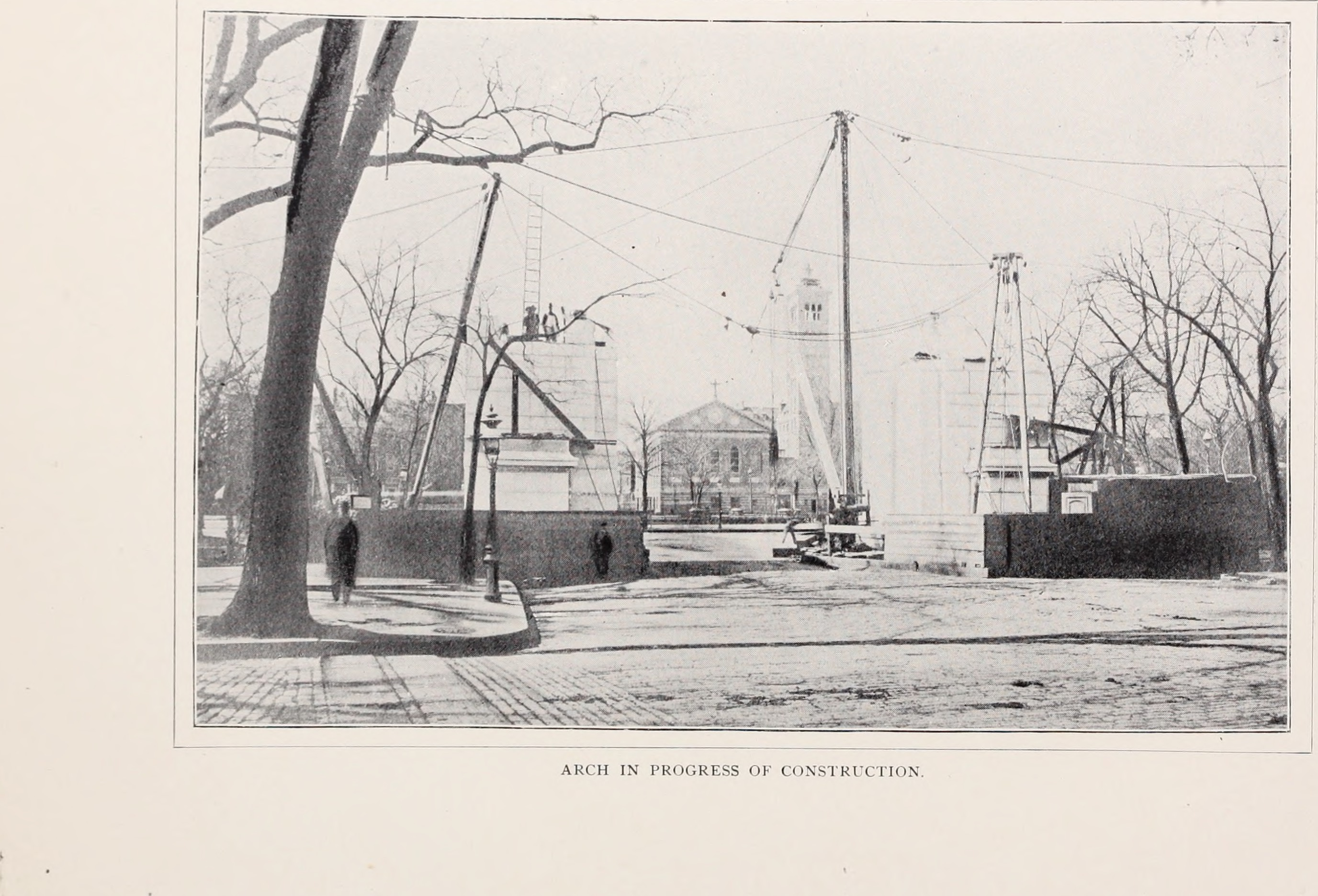
Ceremony of laying the cornerstone of the arch, May 30, 1890

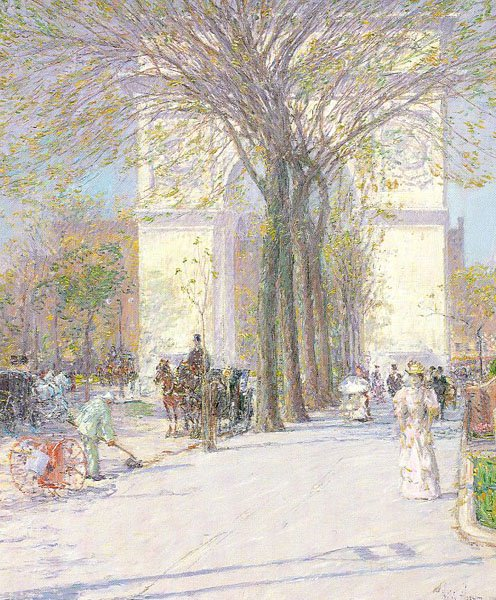
Childe Hassam, Washington Arch, Spring, c. 1893

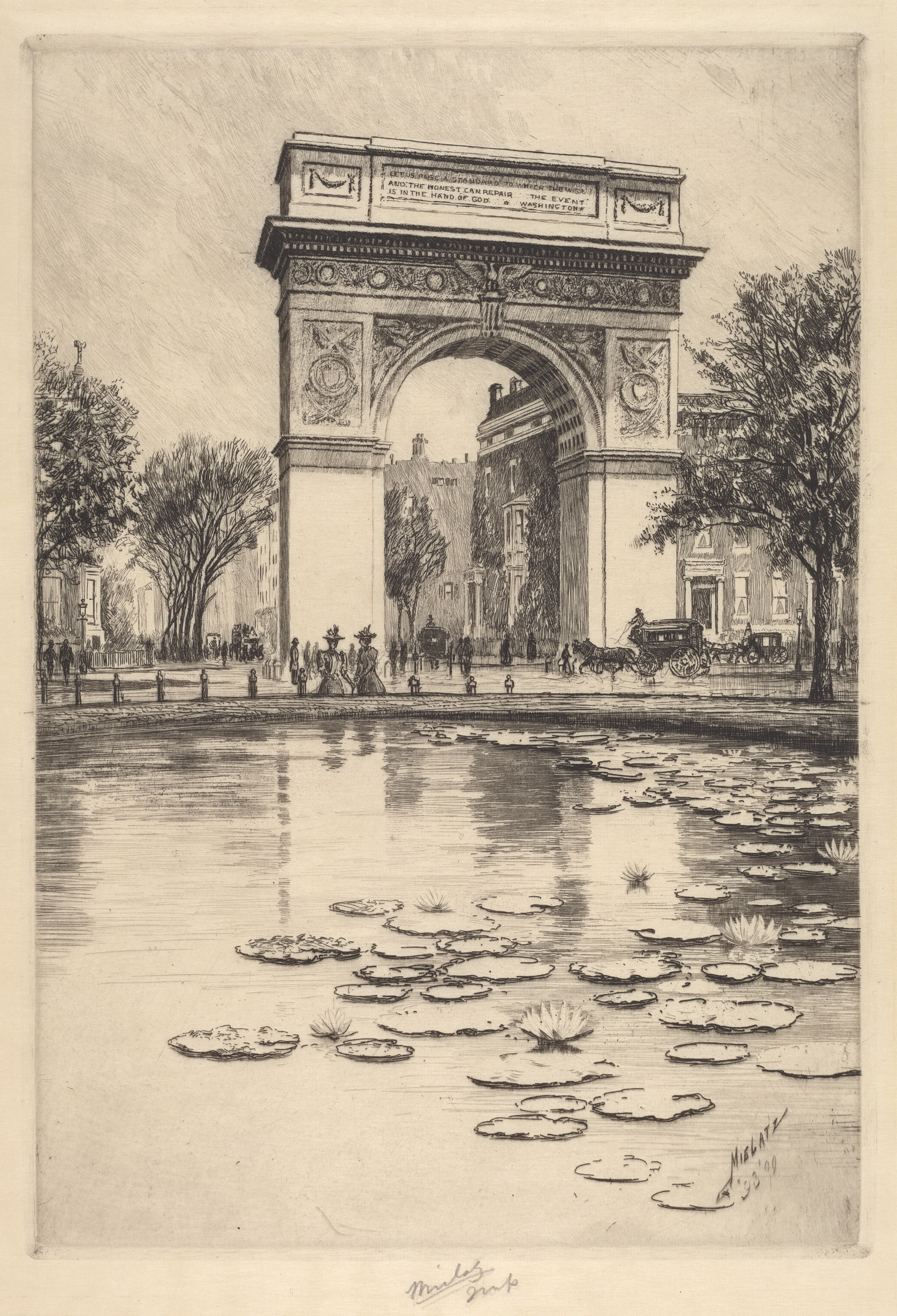
Washington Arch, illustration by Charles Frederick William Mielatz, 1909

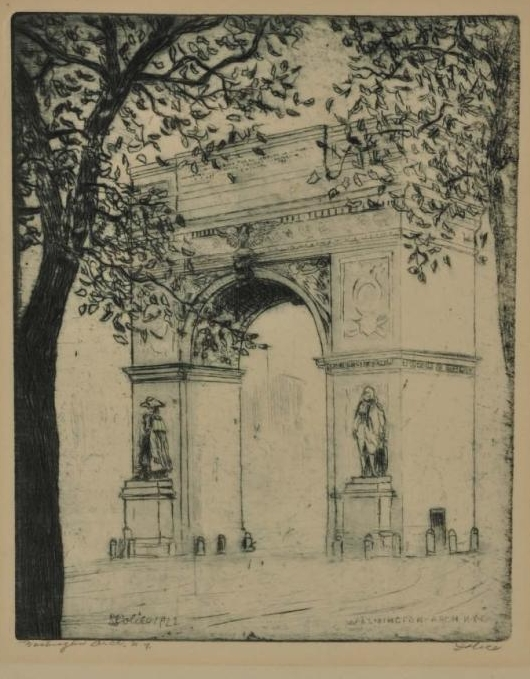
Etching by Leon Dolice, 1922

A view from directly beneath the arch

Reception of Prince Ferdinando, Duke of Genoa, passing Washington Arch, 1917

Washington Square and Arch from King’s Handbook of New York City, 1893

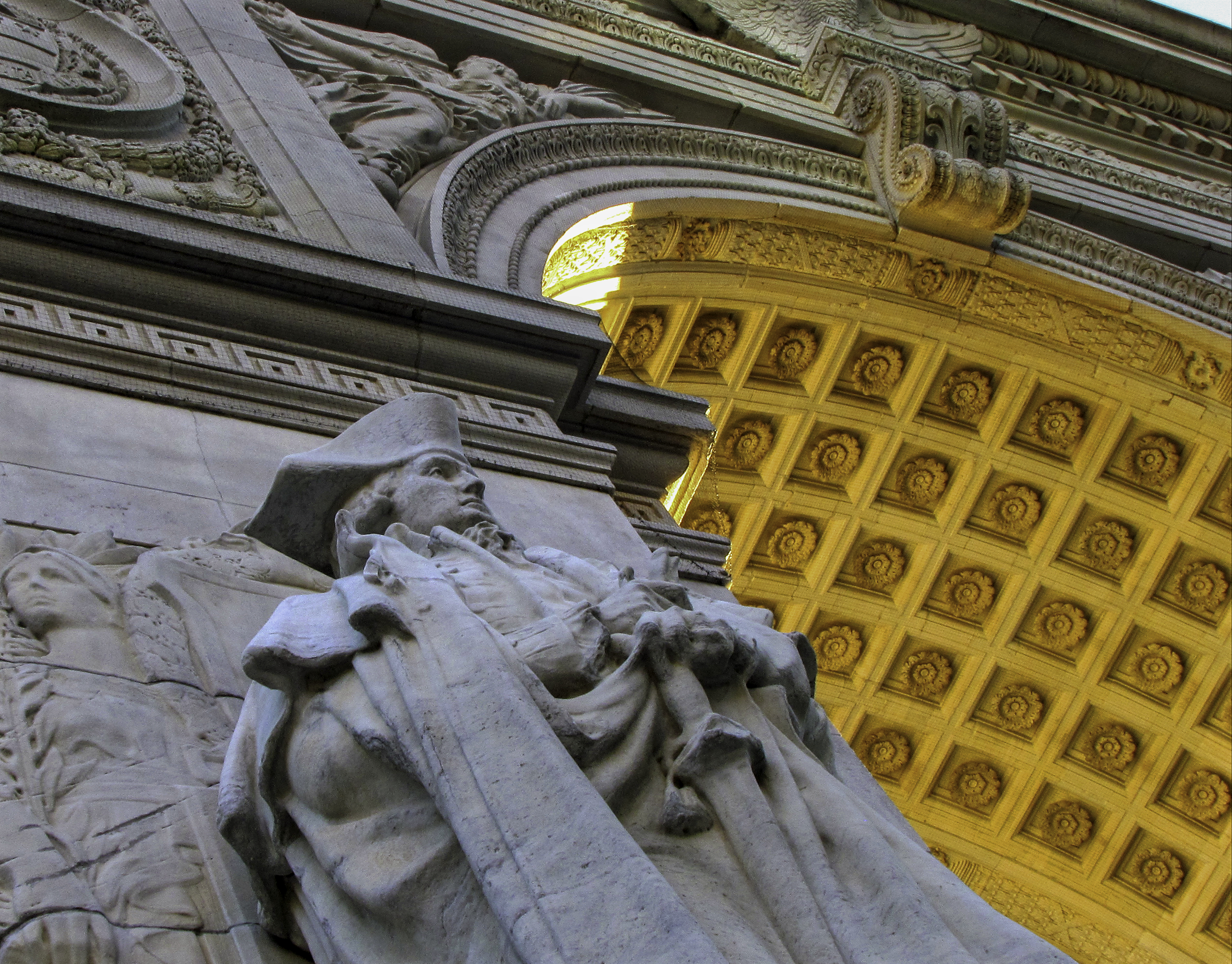
Photo taken in 2010

Photo taken in 2015

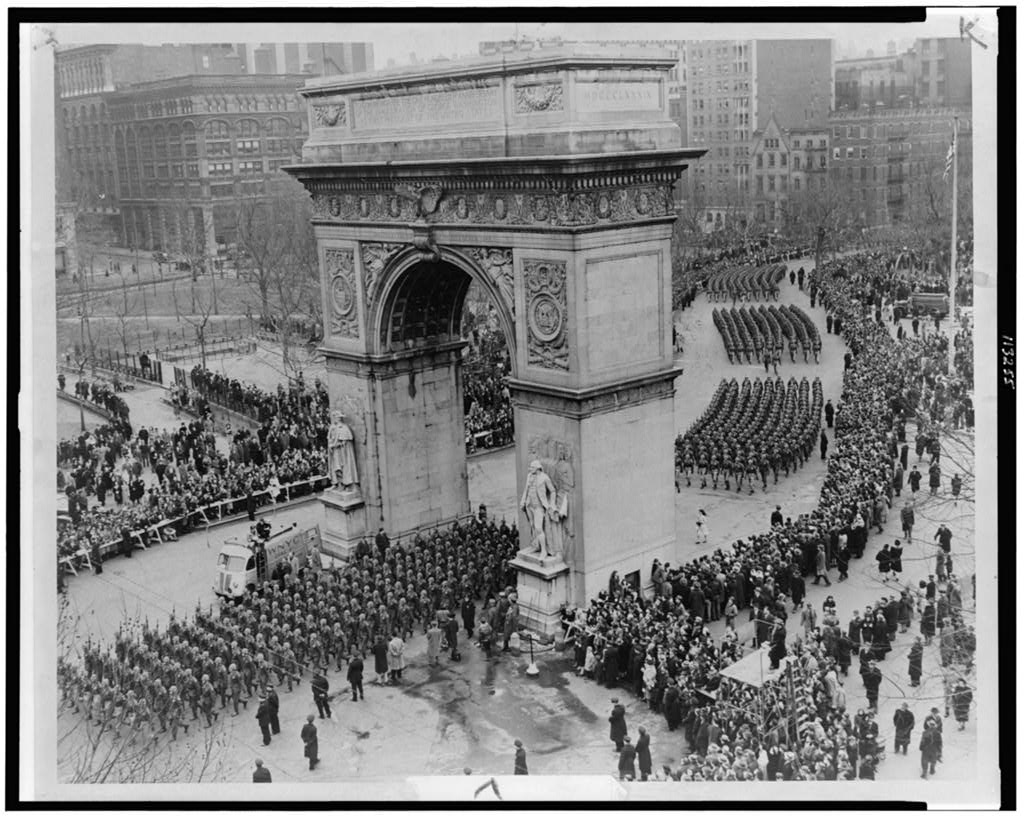
U.S. Army's 82nd Airborne Division parade passing the Arch, 1946

== See also ==
- List of post-Roman triumphal arches
