= John Ramage =

John Ramage may refer to:

- John Ramage (artist) (1748–1802), Irish American artist
- John Ramage (ice hockey) (born 1991), American ice hockey player
