= Oath book =

Book used for legitimizing oaths or sworn statements

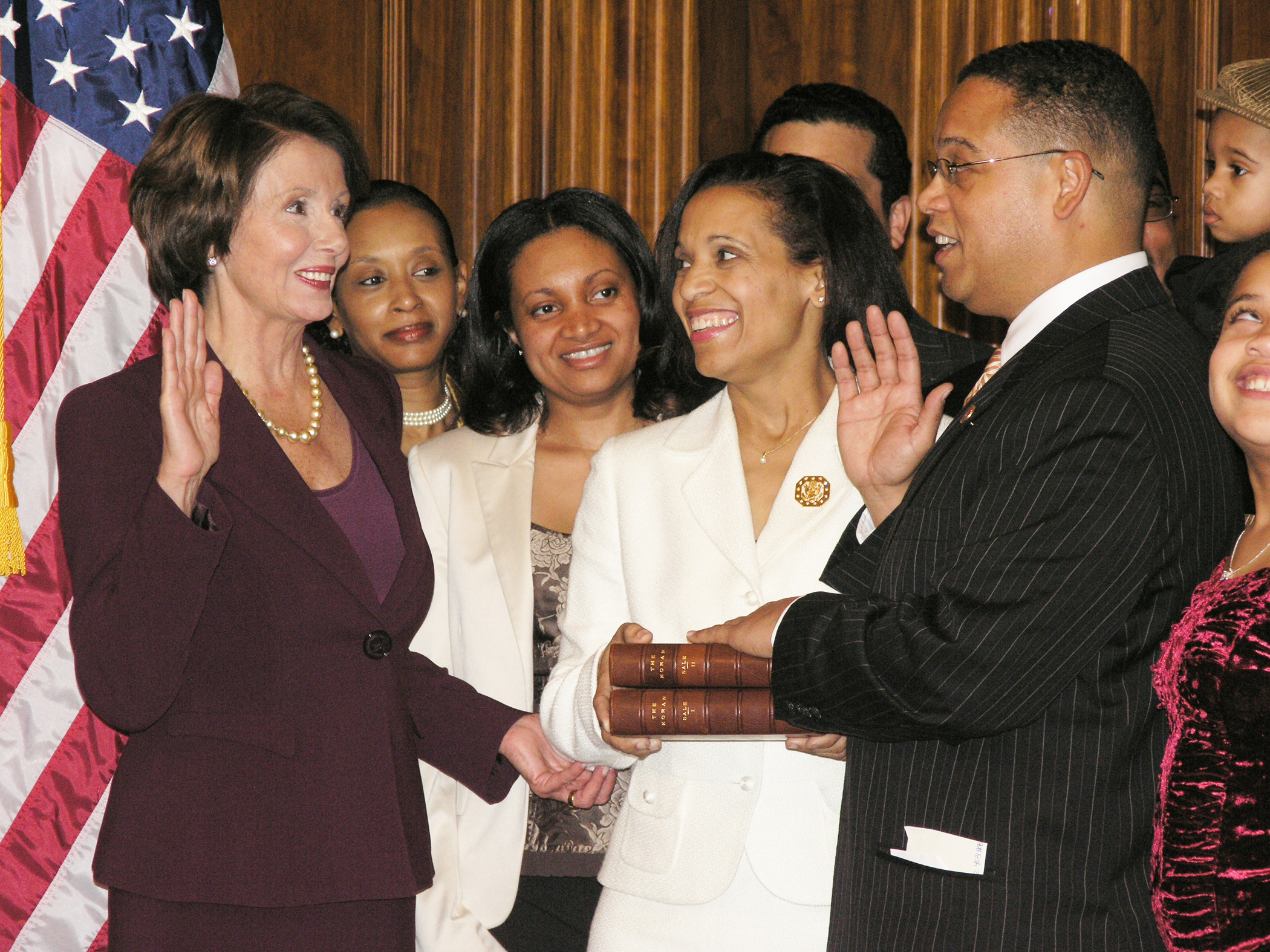
U.S. representative Keith Ellison swears the oath of office on a Quran, 2007

An oath book (also spelled oathbook or oath-book) is a book upon which an oath is sworn, typically in oaths of office and in courts of law to provide sworn testimony. Rooted in Germanic pagan and Jewish custom, the practice of swearing upon books is performed across various religions and countries. Christians generally swear upon the Bible (or historically a Gospel book), Jews by the Torah, Muslims by the Quran, and Hindus by the Bhagavad Gita, although some religious opposition to the practice exists, particularly among Quakers.

== History ==
=== Medieval period ===
The practice of swearing upon holy books is rooted in both the Germanic pagan custom of swearing by physical items and also the Jewish custom of swearing upon the Torah. Practice in the Western world can be traced back to 9th-century England, when Gospel Books were used for certain governmental transactions. By the 12th century, English courts of law had adopted the procedure in oaths. The exact usage of oath books within such courts of law is difficult to determine, as court records and legal treatises often presuppose knowledge of the procedure.

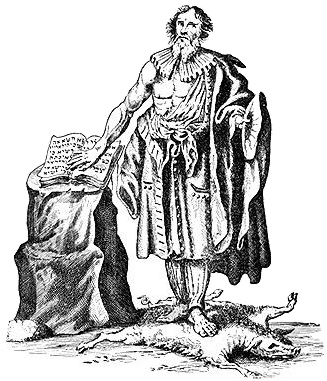
A 17th-century print depicting a German Jew taking a "Jewish oath"

In two 14th-century records where the nature of the practice is elucidated, the procedure follows a common formula of the oath-taker identifying the book as the Gospels, asserting its sacredness, and acknowledging their physical contact with the book. The usage of Gospel books for oaths was not without opposition from other Christians, such as John Wycliffe, who saw it as violating the Third Commandment (Exodus 20:7). Across Medieval Europe, Jews were obliged to take special "Jewish oaths" on Torah scrolls or Humashim in court, although from the 13th-century onward, Jews were subjected to further requirements during the process, such as laying the whole hand on the scripture as far as the wrist. In 14th-century Iberia, Muslims living in Christian lands were in some cases required to swear upon the Quran. In the Mughal Empire, the practice of Muslims swearing by the Quran and Hindus by the Bhagavad Gita was formalized in courts of law.

=== Modern period ===
The custom of oath books in courts of law was imported into the Colonial United States from English common law, by which time the procedure usually involved the swearer kissing the book, although by 1904 the American legal scholar John Henry Wigmore would remark that "custom of kissing the Book is now coming to be generally recognized as both repulsive and unsanitary; celluloid covers are sometimes provided. But it should be clearly understood that the ceremony of kissing is for most persons a wholly unessential feature." In 1840, the British Empire began abolishing the requirement of oath books for Hindus and Muslims in India, and in 1969, a law was passed in the Republic of India to lift the requirement for all people regardless of religion.

== Law around the world ==
=== India ===
Under a 1969 law, courts in India cannot require a person to swear by a book, with only a statement swearing or affirming truthfulness being necessary to provide testimony, contrary to what is often portrayed in Indian cinema.

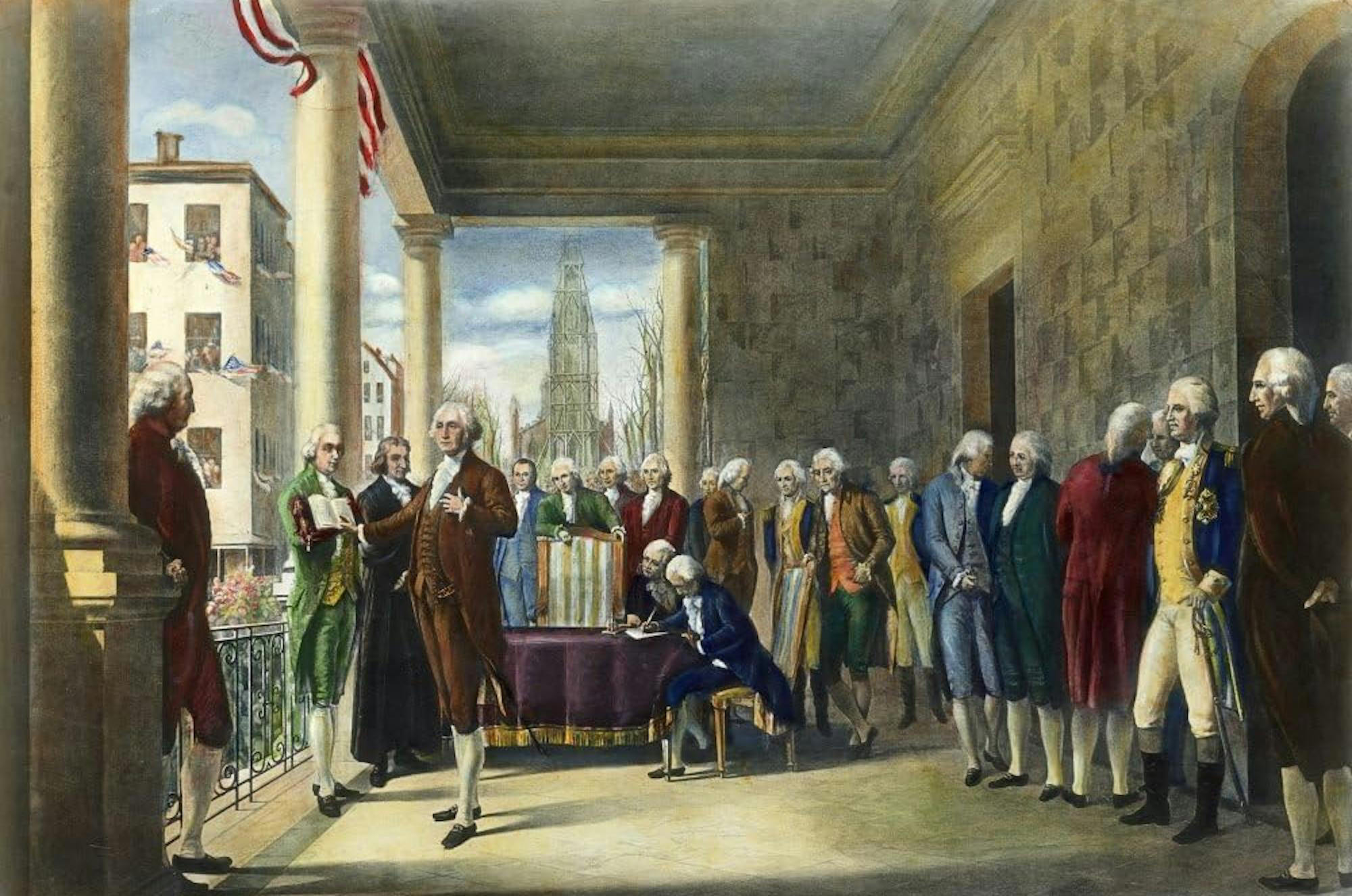
George Washington swearing upon his Bible at his first inauguration as U.S. president

=== United Kingdom ===
Courts in England and Wales require that people of faith swear upon their respective holy books, whereas atheists are not required to swear upon any book. A proposal in the Magistrates' Association in 2013 to lift the requirement was rejected.

=== United States ===
Oaths of office in the United States are often performed with religious books, although the No Religious Test Clause prohibits the requirement of any person to do so.

== Religious views ==
=== Christianity ===
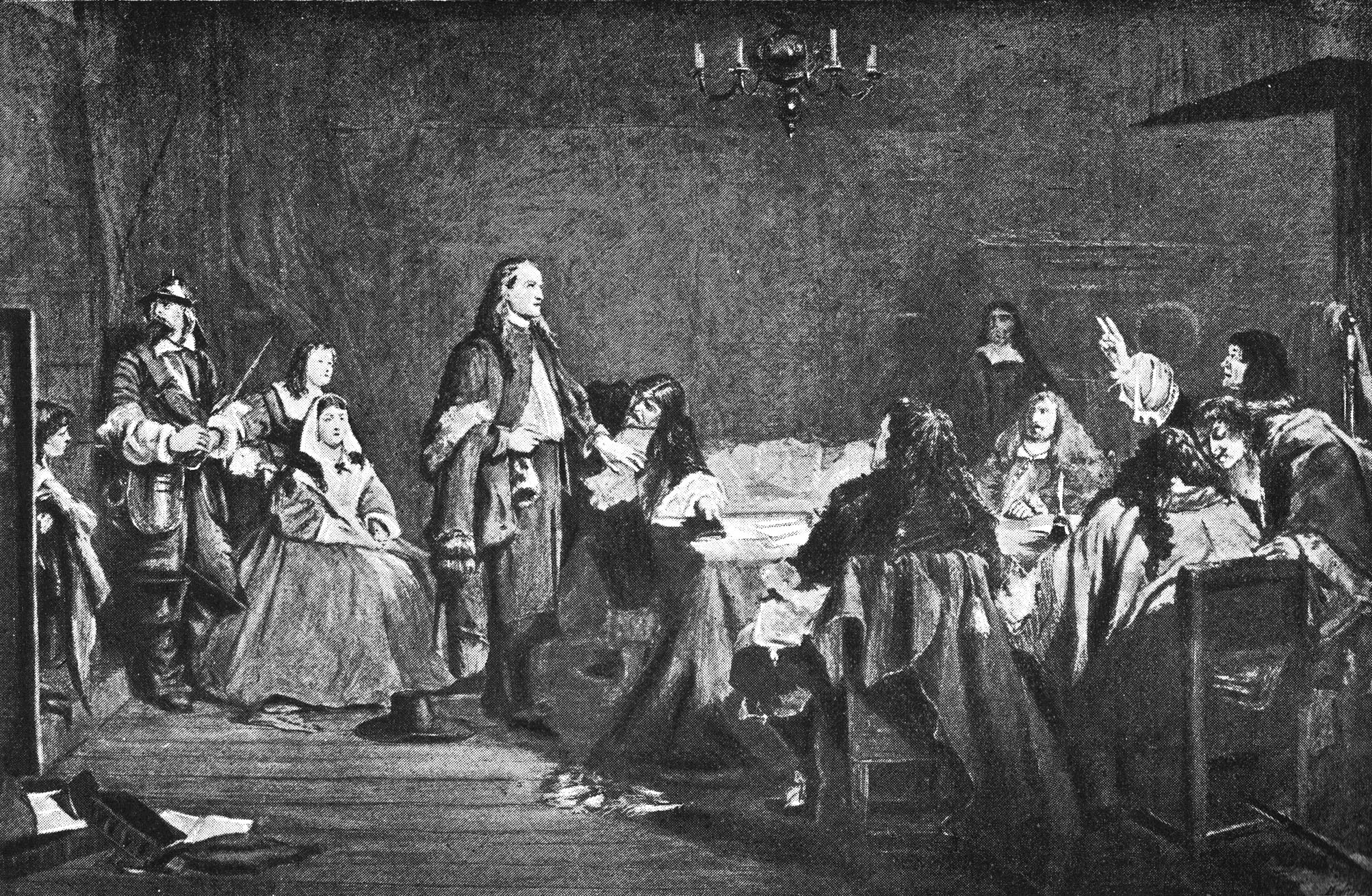
An 1863 illustration of George Fox refusing to swear an oath on the Bible due to his Quaker faith

Although Early Christians were reluctant to swear oaths of any kind, the practice was largely adopted after increasing influence with the Roman Empire. Catholic and most Protestant authorities are not opposed to the requirement of oaths by political authorities. Historically, many Catholics have refused to swear upon Protestant translations of the Bible, although it is not prohibited according to the American Ecclesiastical Review. Quakers are opposed to swearing oaths of all kinds, including on Bibles, and were thus unable to provide witness testimony or join parliament in the United Kingdom until 1699 and 1833 respectively.

=== Islam ===
Generally, Muslims are not required to take oaths on the Quran, although many choose to do so. The position of the Maliki school is unclear on if the Quran may be used for swearing, with some jurists stipulating against it and others permitting any object venerated by Muslims (presumably including the Quran) to be used in oaths.

=== Judaism ===
According to the Talmud, judicial oaths are to be performed while holding a scroll of the Torah.

== See also ==
- George Washington Inaugural Bible
- Lincoln Bible
- Quran oath controversy of the 110th United States Congress
