= George Washington Inaugural Bible =

Bible used in Oath of Office of United States Presidents

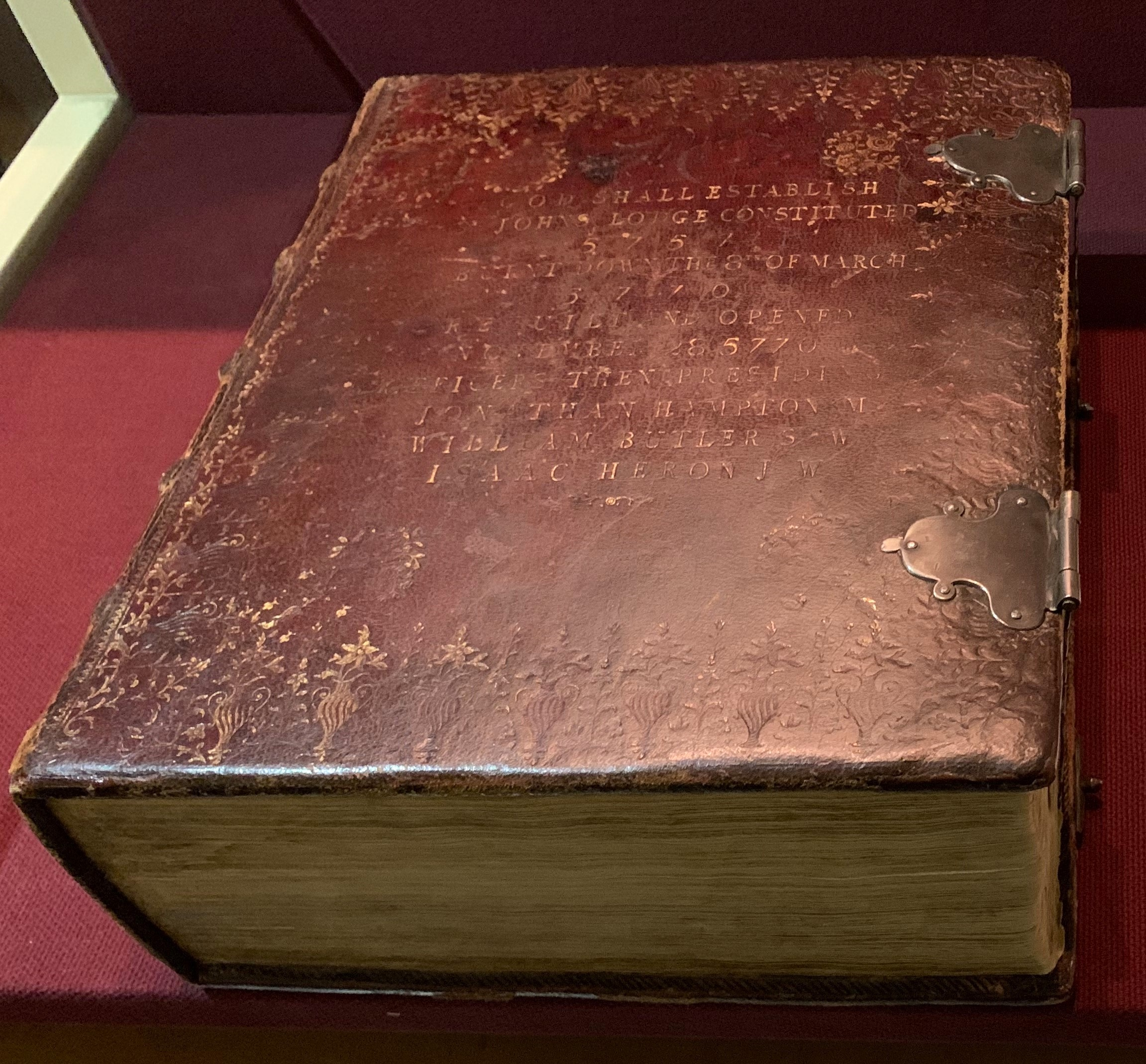
Inaugural Bible as displayed at Federal Hall National Memorial

The George Washington Inaugural Bible is the Bible that was sworn upon by George Washington when he took office as the first president of the United States on April 30, 1789. The Bible has subsequently been the oath book in the inauguration ceremonies of several other U.S. presidents.

The Bible is the King James Version, dated 1767, complete with the Apocrypha and supplemented with the historical, astronomical and legal data of that period. St. John's Lodge No. 1, Ancient York Masons, are the custodians of what is now known as the George Washington Inaugural Bible. There is dispute over whether the Bible was randomly opened to Genesis 49 during the ceremony, or whether Washington purposely chose it.

== History ==
=== George Washington's first inauguration ===
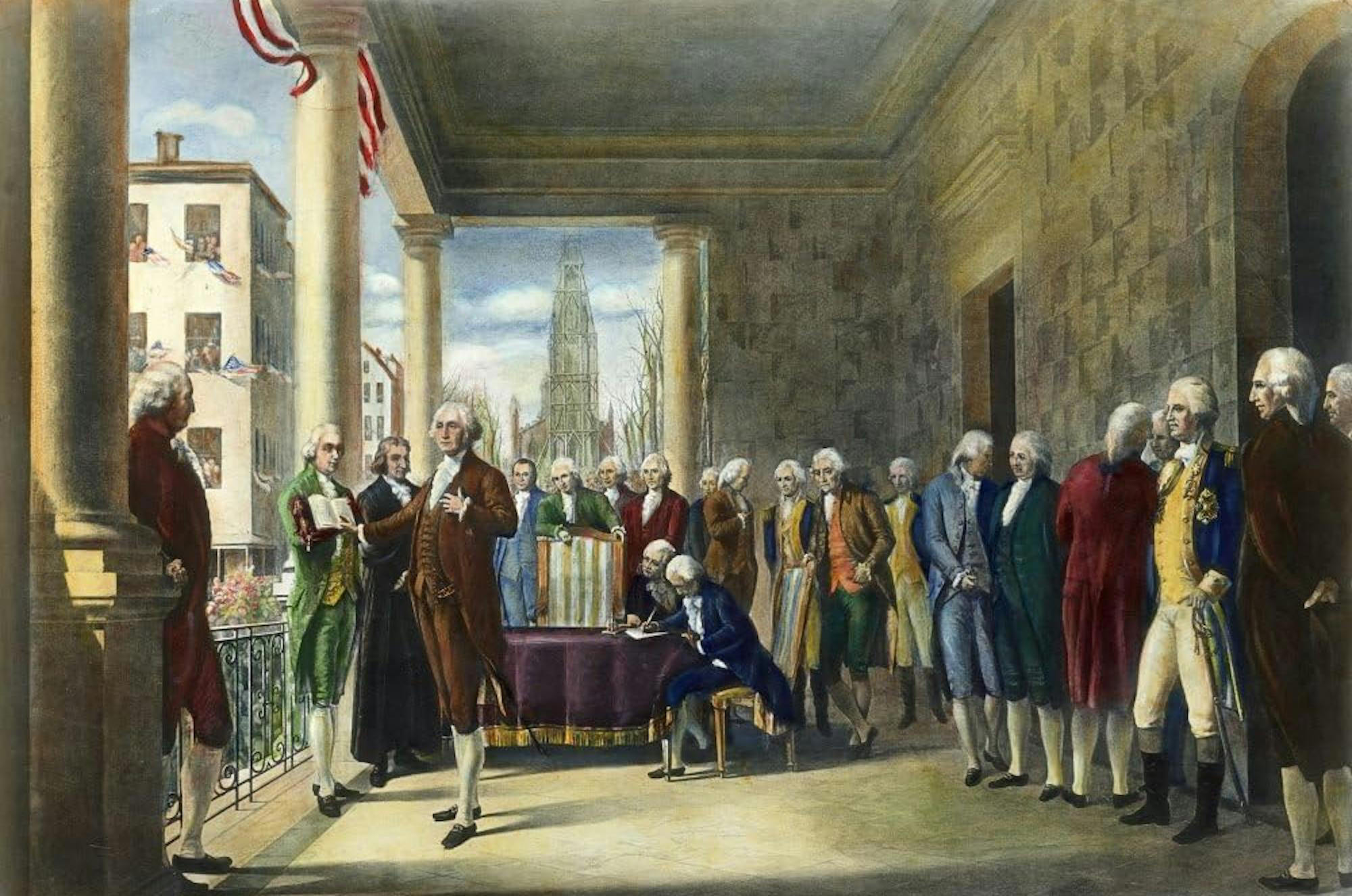
Washington's Inauguration

The inaugural ceremony took place on the balcony of Federal Hall on Wall Street in New York City, in the presence of a large number of onlookers. Washington was dressed in a suit of dark brown cloth and white silk stockings, all of American manufacture. His hair was powdered and dressed in the fashion of the day, clubbed and ribboned.

The oath of office was first administered by Robert R. Livingston. The open Bible on which the President laid his hand was held on a rich crimson velvet cushion by Samuel Otis, Secretary of the Senate. With them were John Adams, who had been elected vice president; George Clinton, first Governor of New York; Philip Schuyler, John Jay, Maj. Gen. Henry Knox, Jacob Morton (Master of St. John's Lodge, who had retrieved the Lodge Bible when they discovered none had been provided), and other distinguished guests.

Without reliable contemporary accounts, the most common account of the event is that after taking his oath, Washington kissed the Bible reverently, closed his eyes and in an attitude of devotion said "So help me God." Livingston then exclaimed, "It is done!" and turning to the people he shouted, "Long live George Washington, President of the United States!," a shout that was echoed and re-echoed by the multitude present.

However, there is currently debate as to whether or not he added the phrase "So help me God" to his oath. The only contemporaneous account of Washington's oath is from French consul Comte de Moustier who reported the constitutional oath with no mention of "So help me God". The earliest known source indicating Washington did add "So help me God" is attributed to Washington Irving, aged six at the time of the inauguration, and first appears 60 years after the event.

=== Other inaugurations and appearances ===
The Bible has since been used for the inaugurations of Warren G. Harding in 1921, Dwight D. Eisenhower in 1953, Jimmy Carter in 1977, and George H. W. Bush, whose 1989 inauguration was in the bicentennial year of Washington's. The Bible was also intended to be used for the first inauguration of George W. Bush, but heavy rain didn't allow it. However, the Bible was present in the Capitol Building in the care of three freemasons of St. John's Lodge, in case the weather got better.

In addition to its duties, the Bible has been used in the funeral processions of Presidents Washington in 1799 and Abraham Lincoln in 1865. The Bible has also been used at the dedication of the Washington Monument in 1885. It was used to open the 1964 World's Fair as well as the launching of the aircraft carrier USS George Washington.

It has also been used at cornerstone ceremonies for Masonic temples in Boston in 1867, Philadelphia in 1869.

In recent years, it has been displayed in New York at the Federal Hall National Memorial, located on the site of Washington's inauguration, and the New York Historical Society, and in Washington, D.C. at the Smithsonian and the United States Capitol Visitor Center.

=== St. John's Lodge No. 1 Foundation, Inc. ===
In 2009, the Lodge formed a registered public charity for the purpose of preserving, maintaining and restoring the George Washington Inaugural Bible. In 2014, the St. John's Lodge No. 1 Foundation, Inc., received recognition as an IRS 501(c)(3) non-profit organization.

== See also ==
- United States presidential inauguration
- Lincoln Bible
- List of George Washington articles
