= Quran oath controversy of the 110th United States Congress =

American political and religious controversy

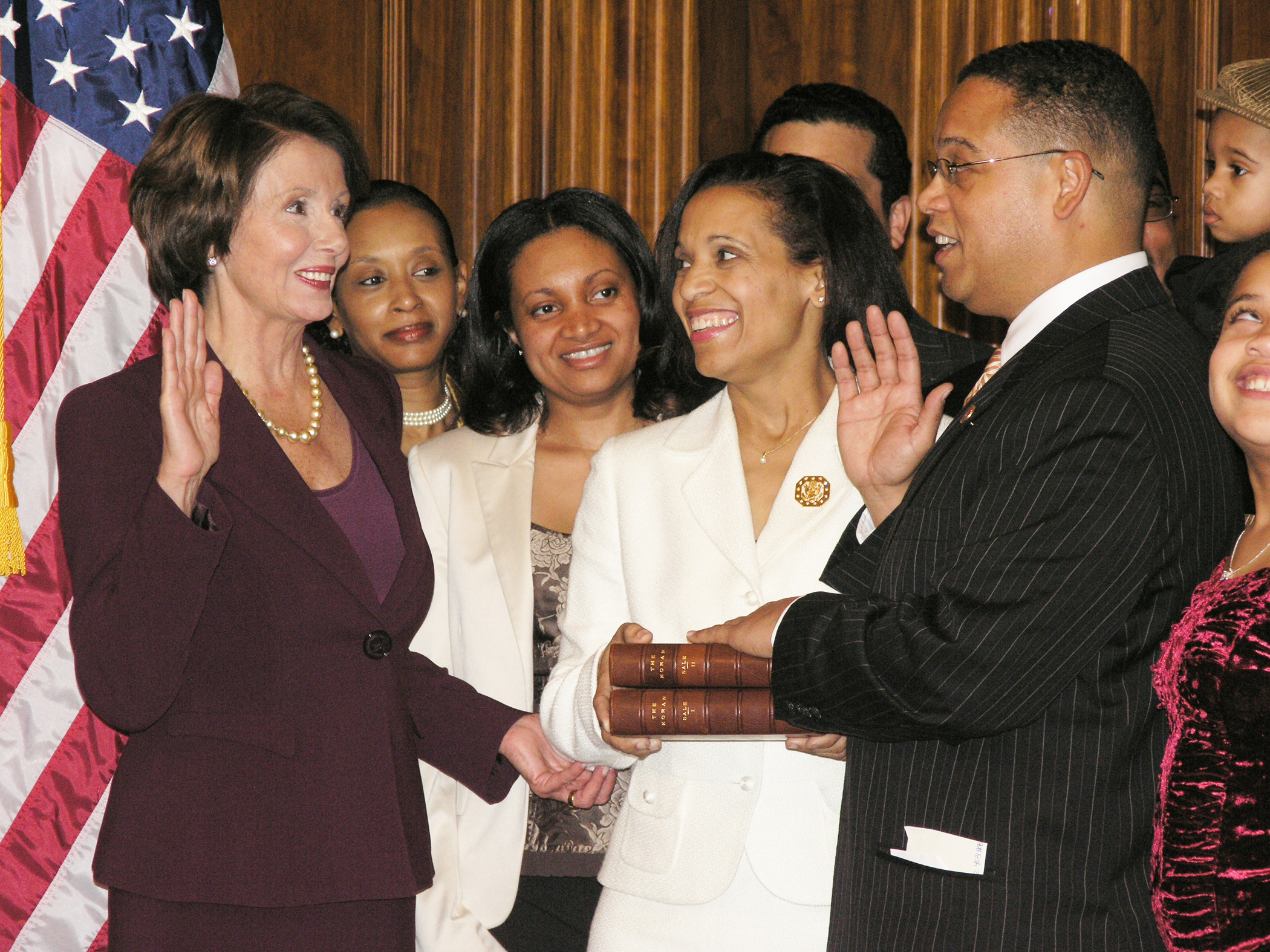
Ellison's photo-op reenactment of his swearing in ceremony with Thomas Jefferson's Quran

In mid-November 2006, it was reported that Keith Ellison, the first Muslim ever elected to the United States Congress, would take his oath of office (as a representative for Minnesota's 5th congressional district) with his hand on the Quran. In reaction to the news, right-wing media pundit Dennis Prager criticized the decision in his November 28, 2006, column titled "America, not Keith Ellison, decides what book a Congressman takes his oath on", saying, "What Ellison and his Muslim and leftist supporters are saying is that it is of no consequence what America holds as its holiest book; all that matters is what any individual holds to be his holiest book."

The column attracted national attention from supporters of both Ellison and Prager. Presented with the fact that all members of the House swear in (or affirm) en masse without the use of any religious text, and that such works are only used in ceremonial reenactments afterwards, Prager stated "That's the whole point: It's exactly because it's ceremonial that it matters."

The controversy became more heated when Rep. Virgil Goode (R–VA) issued a letter to his constituents stating his view that Ellison's decision to use the Quran is a threat to "the values and beliefs traditional to the United States of America ... if American citizens don't wake up and adopt the Virgil Goode position on immigration there will likely be many more Muslims elected to office and demanding the use of the Koran." Goode's foray into the controversy caused many other members of Congress to weigh in.

For his ceremonial swearing-in, Ellison used a copy of George Sale's English translation of the Quran that had once belonged to Thomas Jefferson.

== Constitutional provisions ==
The Constitution of the United States states "no religious test shall ever be required as a qualification to any office or public trust under the United States" (Article VI, section 3) and at least four Presidents have not been sworn in on a Bible.

In his December 5, 2006 article on the subject Prager denied that he was promoting a de facto religious test, despite his position that Ellison should not be allowed to take his oath on the Quran. Law Professor Eugene Volokh noted that the Constitution states officials "'shall be bound by Oath or Affirmation, to support this Constitution; but no religious Test shall ever be required ...' The option of giving an affirmation rather than oath ... [shows] the Constitution thus already expressly authorizes people not to swear at all, but to affirm, without reference to God or to a sacred work. Atheists and agnostics are thus protected, as well as members of certain Christian groups [such as Quakers]. Why would Muslims and others not be equally protected from having to perform a religious ritual that expressly invokes a religion in which they do not believe?" Mazie Hirono (D–HI), who is a Buddhist, announced that she would use the affirmation option and without the use of any religious text in the swearing-in ceremony.

== Use of other texts for oath of office ==
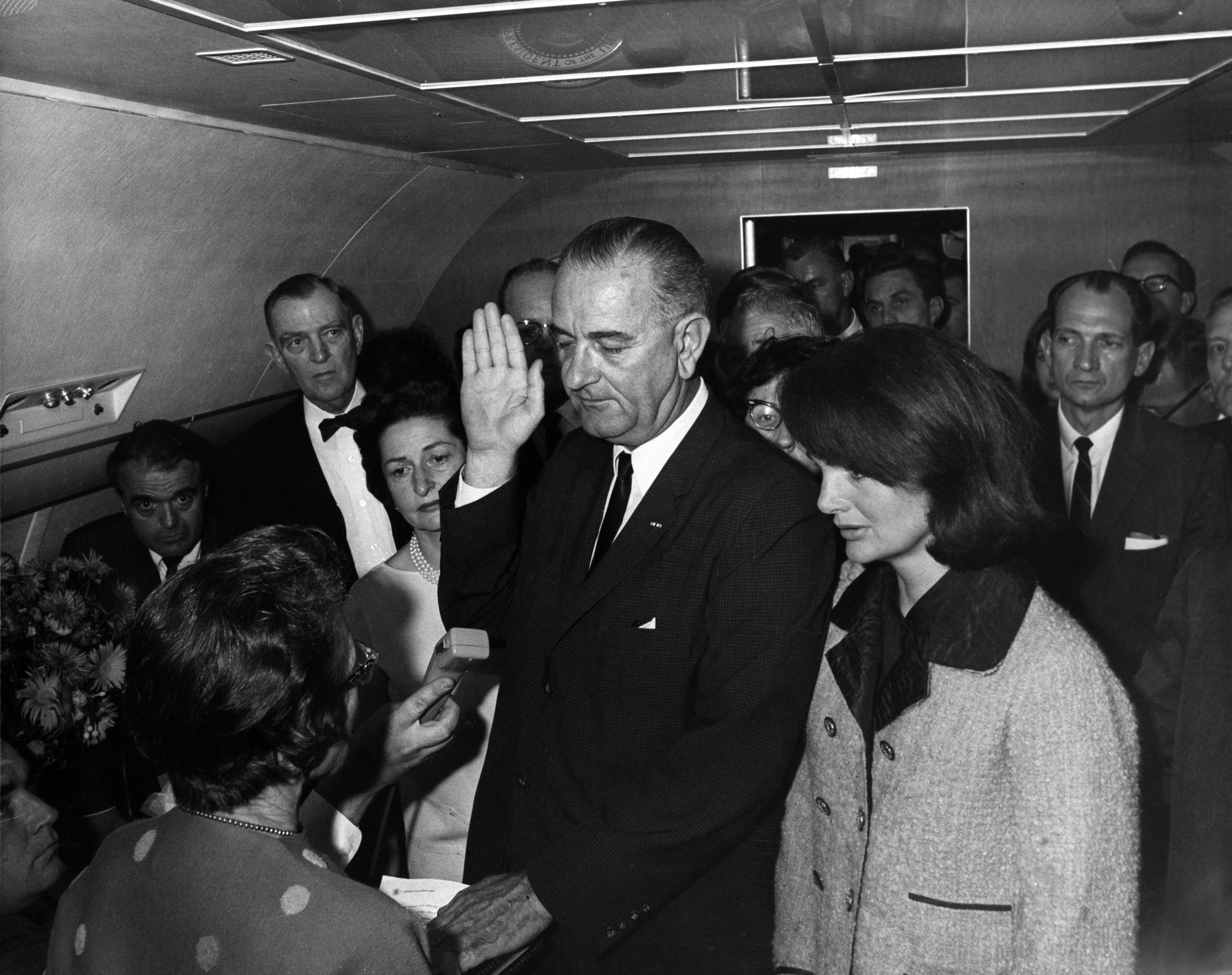
Lyndon B. Johnson being sworn in aboard Air Force One with a Catholic missal.

John Quincy Adams took the presidential oath on a law volume containing a copy of the Constitution in 1825, and in 1853, Franklin Pierce affirmed the oath rather than swearing it. Theodore Roosevelt used no Bible in taking his first oath of office in 1901, but did in 1905. Other sources have noted that after John F. Kennedy was assassinated, a Catholic missal was used, as no Bible could be found when Lyndon B. Johnson (who was not Catholic, but a Disciple of Christ) assumed the Presidency.

The Library of Congress notes that "As the first Catholic-elected president, Kennedy was the first to use a Catholic (Douay-Rheims) version of the Bible for his oath."

== Prager rescinds call for Ellison not to serve ==
Although Prager previously wrote that Ellison should not be allowed to use the Quran for his swearing-in ceremony and that he should not serve in Congress if he was "incapable of taking an oath on that book [the Bible]," he subsequently stated in a telephone interview with the Associated Press that he did not think Ellison should be banned from serving. "I don't think anything legal should be done about this." In an interview with USA Today's Andrea Stone, Prager indicated that he would continue to write and speak about his opinion that Ellison and others should not use the Quran for swearing-in ceremonies while acknowledging that legally preventing Ellison from using the Quran could be unconstitutional. Prager said "I'm not arguing legality. I'm arguing what you should do."

== The U.S. Holocaust Memorial Council's resolution ==
Because of his part in the controversy, the Council on American–Islamic Relations (CAIR) called for Prager to be removed from the United States Holocaust Memorial Council overseeing the United States Holocaust Memorial Museum. CAIR's executive director said, "No one who holds such bigoted, intolerant and divisive views should be in a policymaking position at a taxpayer-funded institution that seeks to educate Americans about the destructive impact hatred has had, and continues to have, on every society". Some members of the Memorial Council like Ed Koch were vocal in advocating his removal. In the end the executive committee of the council issued a resolution that the Council "disassociates itself from Mr. Prager's statements as being antithetical to the mission of the [Holocaust] Museum as an institution promoting tolerance and respect for all peoples regardless of their race, religion or ethnicity".

== Impact of Virgil Goode ==
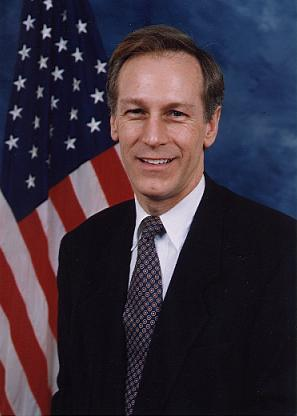
US Rep. Virgil H. Goode, Jr., of Virginia's 5th district

A new level of gravity came to the controversy when responding to "a flood of e-mails from constituents" about Ellison's oath, fifth term Representative Virgil H. Goode, Jr. (R–VA) issued a letter on the matter. Goode wrote "When I raise my hand to take the oath on Swearing In Day, I will have the Bible in my other hand. I do not subscribe to using the Koran in any way. The Muslim Representative from Minnesota was elected by the voters of that district and if American citizens don't wake up and adopt the Virgil Goode position on immigration there will likely be many more Muslims elected to office and demanding the use of the Koran ... I fear that in the next century we will have many more Muslims in the United States if we do not adopt the strict immigration policies that I believe are necessary to preserve the values and beliefs traditional to the United States of America and to prevent our resources from being swamped."

Goode's letter generated much criticism from Muslim-American advocacy groups and from his fellow United States legislators. Among those critical of Goode, were Reps. Bill Pascrell, Jr. (D–NJ), Jim Moran (D–VA), Mike Honda (D-CA), Rahm Emanuel (D–IL), and Nancy Pelosi (D–CA) plus Senators Bob Menendez (D–NJ) and Lindsey Graham (R–SC).

Goode's spokesman, Linwood Duncan, said "no apology was forthcoming, and that the congressman stands by the letter."

== Thomas Jefferson's Quran ==
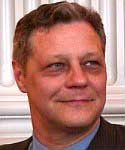
Mark Dimunation, Chief of the Rare Book and Special Collections Division, Library of Congress.

On January 3, 2007, The Washington Post announced that Ellison "will hold the personal copy once owned by Thomas Jefferson" lent to him by "the rare book and special collections division at the Library of Congress".

Mark Dimunation, head of the rare book and special collections division at the Library of Congress (and former resident of the Congressional District Ellison now represented) said he was contacted early in December 2006 by Ellison, who told him "He wanted to use a Quran that was special."

Ellison spokesman Rick Jauert said "Keith is paying respect not only to the founding fathers' belief in religious freedom but the Constitution itself." Ellison, who was originally told about the Qurʻan from an anonymous letter, spoke to the Associated Press in a phone interview. He said that using Jefferson's Quran makes a point:

"It demonstrates that from the very beginning of our country, we had people who were visionary, who were religiously tolerant, who believed that knowledge and wisdom could be gleaned from any number of sources, including the Qurʻan. A visionary like Thomas Jefferson was not afraid of a different belief system", Ellison said. "This just shows that religious tolerance is the bedrock of our country, and religious differences are nothing to be afraid of."

== Opening day of the 110th Congress ==
=== Ellison at interfaith service ===
On January 4, 2007, before the first session of the 110th Congress, Ellison at a multi-faith prayer service recited verse al-Hujurat 49:13 : "O People! Behold, We have created you male and female, and have made you into nations and tribes, so that you might come to know one another. Verily, the noblest of you in the sight of God is the one who is most deeply conscious of Him. Behold, God is all-knowing."

=== Ceremonial reenactment ===
After the members of the 110th House of Representatives were sworn in en masse, Ellison was the first Representative scheduled to have his picture taken with the new Speaker of the House Nancy Pelosi. Though the Library of Congress is directly across the street from the Capitol, Thomas Jefferson's Quran took fifteen minutes to arrive as it was brought through "a long, winding underground route via tunnels ... to protect the Quran from the elements". Once inside the Capitol, the Quran was placed in a rectangular box, and handled with a green felt wrapper when guards ran the book through security x-ray machines.

Ellison was impressed by the two-volume set, saying "Look at that. That's something else. Oh my God. This is great." A few minutes later, Nancy Pelosi arrived and photos of a ceremonial reenactment oath were taken. There were so many of Ellison's family in attendance that the ceremony was done in two takes. Among his family was his mother Clida Ellison who thought that the controversy had a positive effect, "because many people in America are going to learn what the diversity of America is all about". Clida Ellison noted that she is a practicing Roman Catholic who goes to Mass every day. Ellison expressed his satisfaction that the controversy was behind him:

It was good, we did it, it's over, and now it's time to get down to business ... maybe we don't have to talk about it so much anymore. Not that I'm complaining, but the pressing issues the country is facing are just a little bit more on my mind right now.

== Aftermath ==
On December 12, 2017, Alabama Senate candidate Roy Moore's spokesman, Ted Crockett, was interviewed on CNN, defending Moore's statement that Muslims should not be allowed to serve in the United States Congress based on the inaccurate belief that all incoming members of Congress are legally required to swear their oath of service on a Christian Bible. The interviewer, Jake Tapper, informed Crockett that this is not true and incoming members may choose to swear their oath on a Hebrew Bible or a Quran (as Ellison did). Crockett appeared lost for a response, indicating that he was unaware of Ellison's election, or the circumstances of his taking office. A later article by The New York Times elaborated that "Mr. Ellison, or anyone else, could have also used a comic book, a lesser Shakespeare play, or nothing at all."

On January 3, 2019, Ilhan Omar, Ellison's successor as representative from Minnesota, and Rashida Tlaib, the newly elected representative from Michigan, were both sworn into Congress using copies of the Quran. Tlaib used a copy given to her by a close friend, while Omar used a copy originally owned by her grandfather.

On January 27, 2021, video footage was published of Marjorie Taylor Greene, a Republican congresswoman from Georgia and an avowed supporter of QAnon and other right-wing conspiracy theories, walking through the U.S. Capitol Building on February 22, 2019 (prior to her own election to Congress), arguing that Omar and Tlaib should be required to re-swear their oaths on a Christian Bible, or else they could not be considered "legitimate" members of Congress. Similar to Ted Crockett, Greene was arguing, incorrectly, that a U.S. law requires the use of a Christian Bible, when in fact no such law exists (and would violate the No Religious Test Clause of the Constitution if it did).
