= Leon Dolice =

American painter (1892–1960)

- Born: Leon Louis Dolice; August 14, 1892; Vienna, Austria
- Died: November 16, 1960 (aged 68); New York City
- Known for: Artist

Leon Dolice (1892–1960) was an American artist known for his etchings and pastels of urban scenes. Born in Vienna and trained as a machinist, he left home at the age of 14 to travel in Europe and North Africa. In 1912 he emigrated to New York where he began creating etchings of the city's iconic buildings and by 1922 his work sold well enough for him to devote himself full-time to making art.

When etchings lost their popularity in the early 1930s, he began making pastels, oil paintings, woodcuts, and linoleum prints, and when, at the end of the decade, those works did not sell well enough to support him, he made metalwork decorations for interior design. Throughout his career he typically sold his art face-to-face. In the early years he would sell works door-to-door and later out of his own studio-centered galleries.

During his travels, Dolice acquired a broad understanding of European art. After arriving in New York, his contacts with local artists and his own artistic instincts led him to develop a style of American modernism that, in time, evolved from a literal realism toward a personal interpretation of abstraction.

== Early life and training ==
Dolice was born in Vienna on August 14, 1892. Although he grew up in a working-class home and apprenticed with his machinist father, he showed some talent in drawing and received encouragement from one of his elementary school teachers. Later in life he recognized that in making copperplate etchings he could combine some of the skills he had learned in metalworking with his self-taught skill in drawing. His father died when he was 14. He left the metal shop and set off to explore the European centers of art. Traveling by foot, he made sketches and repaired machinery in return for food and places to sleep, and on reaching Naples spent half a year doing metalwork on a construction job. He next signed on as cook's assistant on a merchant vessel that served Mediterranean ports and that brought him as far west as Portugal and as far north as St. Petersburg.

== Career in art ==
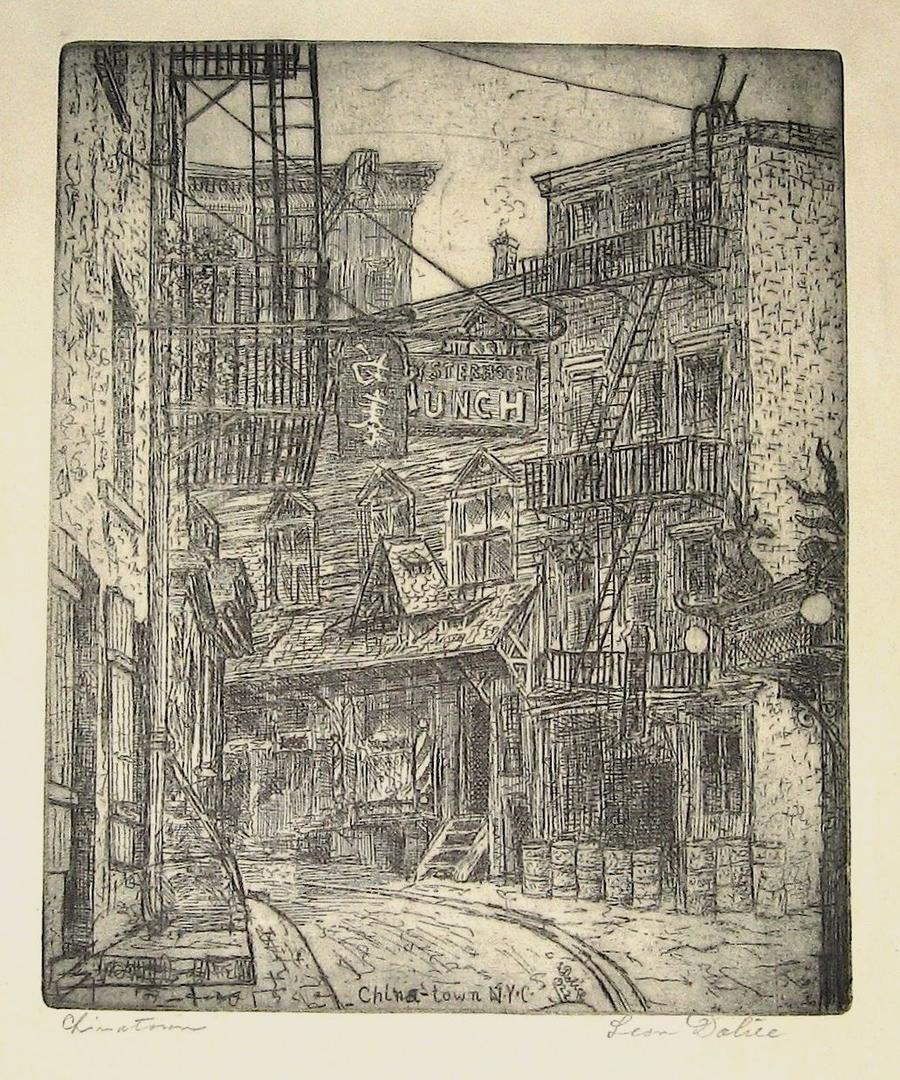
Leon Dolice, Chinatown, 1922, etching, 9 1/4 × 6 3/4 inches

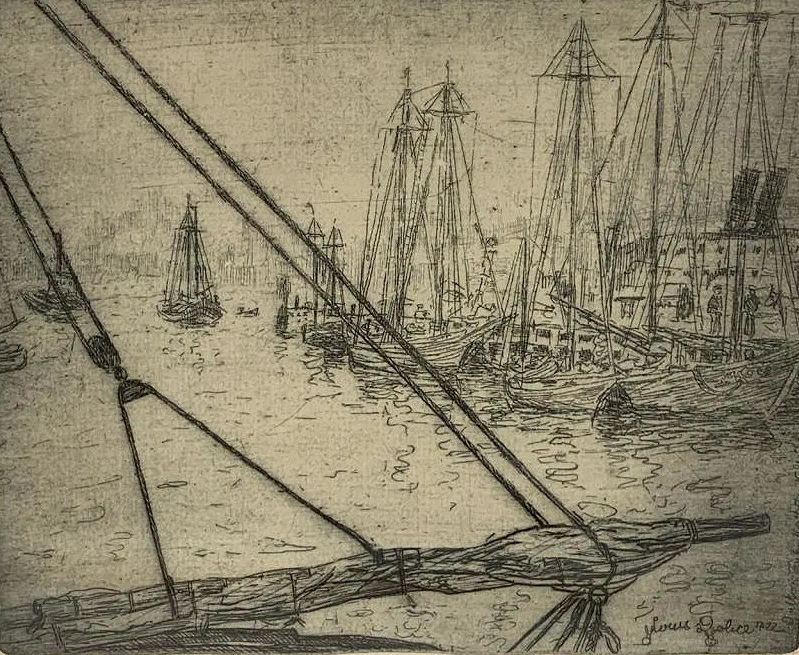
Leon Dolice, East River, 1922, etching, 10 × 13 inches

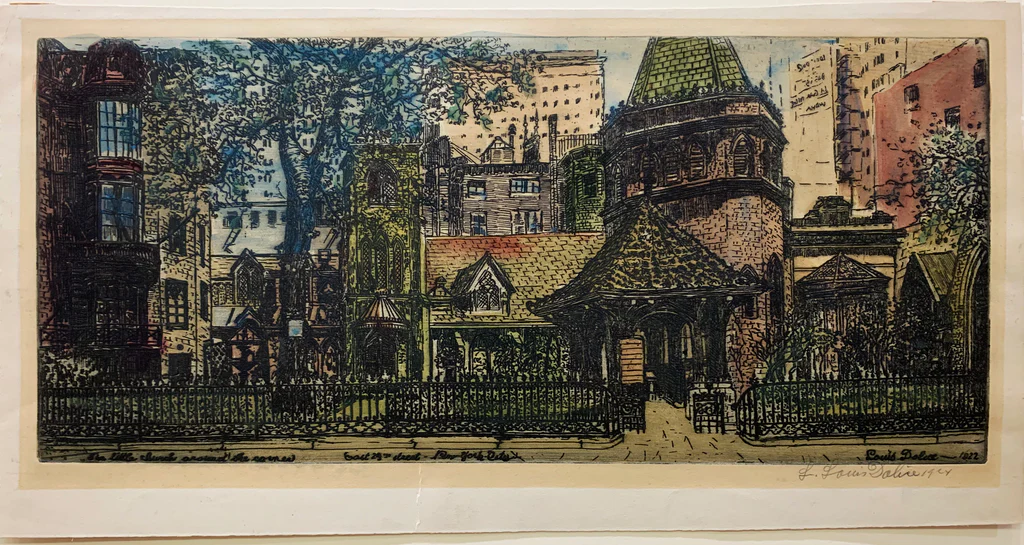
Leon Dolice, Little Church Around the Corner, 1922, etching and aquatint with watercolor, 7 1/4 × 16 1/8 inches

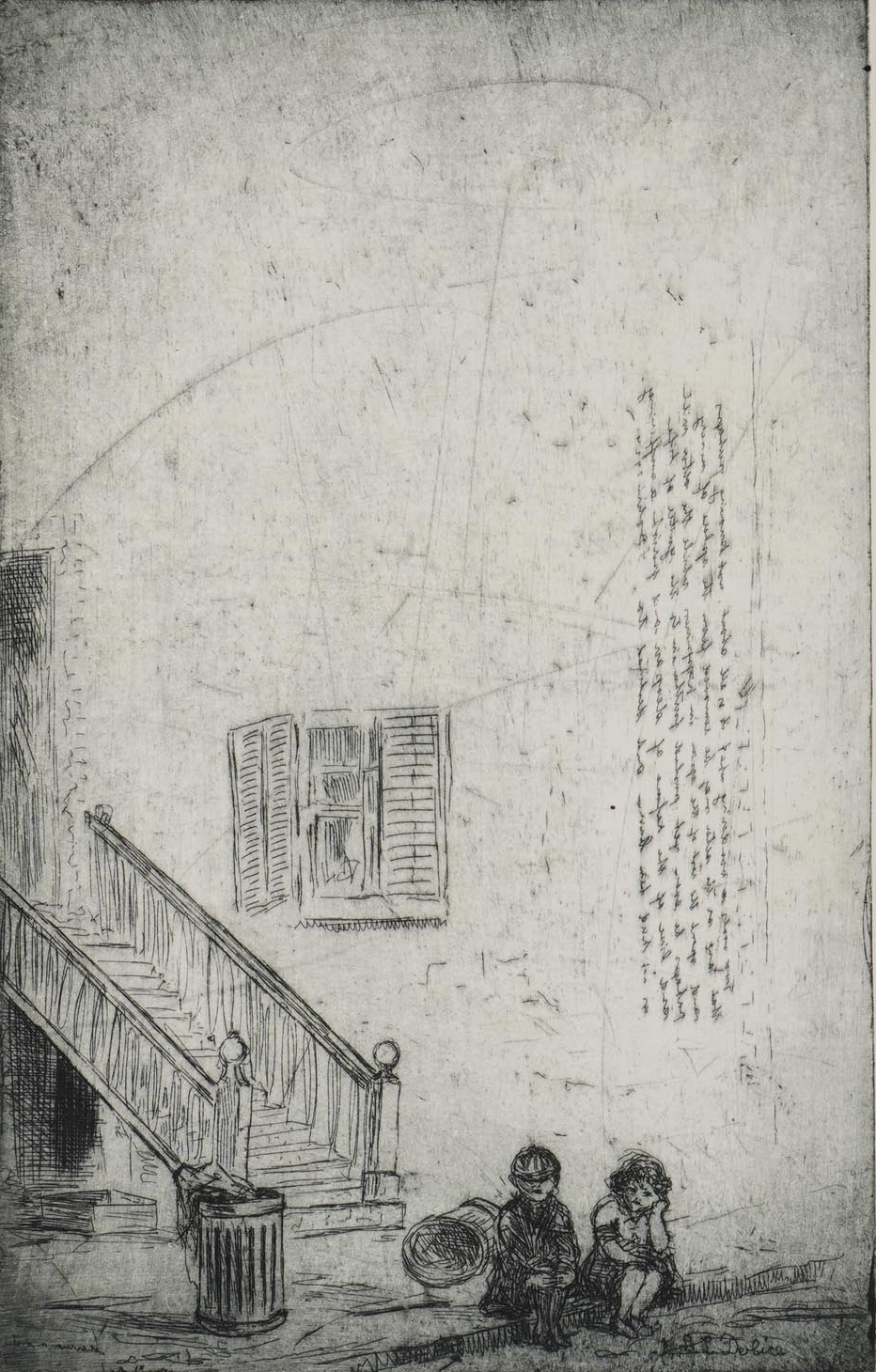
Leon Dolice, The Misery, etching, 9 1/2 x 5 1/2 inches

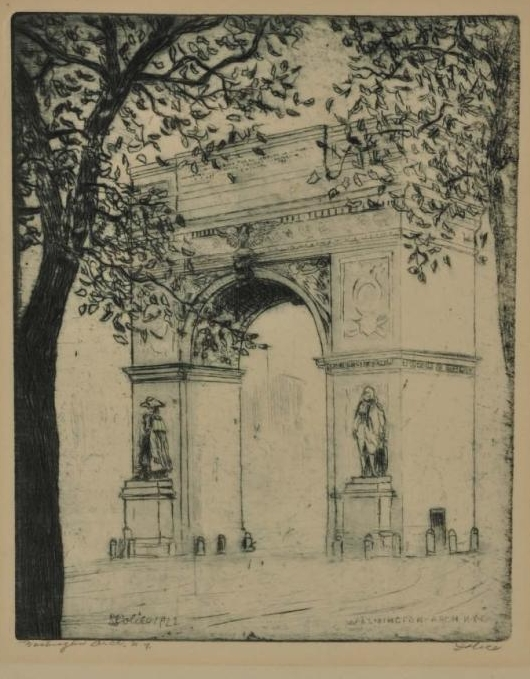
Leon Dolice, Washington Square Arch, 1922 etching, 9 1/4 x 7 1/2 inches

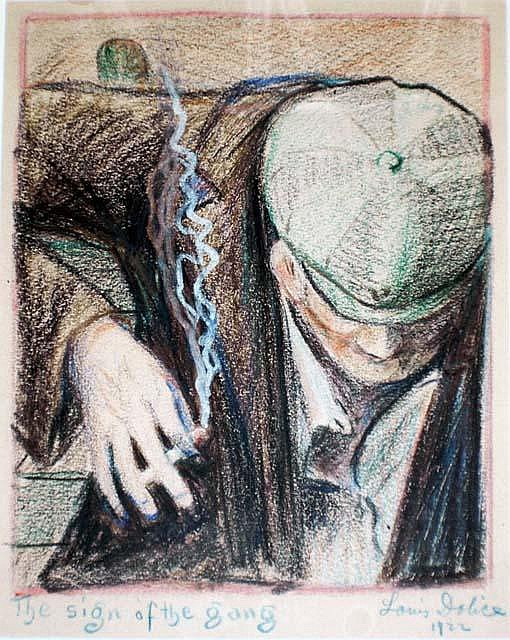
Leon Dolice, The Sign of the Gang, 1922, pastel and colored pencil, 11 x 8 1/2 inches

Dolice later said he started his art career in his late teens when he left the coasting vessel on which he served as cook and began selling drawings to tourists in Alexandria, Egypt. An interviewer quoted him as saying,"The life there fascinated me—camels, Arabs, pyramids. I sketched in pencil and sold my work to tourists. I made so much money I didn't know what to do with it." Leaving Alexandria, he returned to Italy, signed on as cook on a freighter, and, in 1912, arrived in New York having no knowledge of English but competent to work as a chef. He quickly found work in the then-fashionable Sherry's Restaurant at Fifth Avenue and 44th Street. By 1920—by then fluent in English—he had worked his way up to the position of associate chef at the Biltmore luxury hotel on Madison Avenue. During his free time, he made sketches of local sights such as the Washington Square Arch, the Little Church Around the Corner, and Chinatown and turned them into copperplate etchings. He also made genre pictures such as the pastel and pencil drawing called "The Sign of the Gang" and an enigmatic sketch-etching he called "The Misery", both dated 1922. He sold these works door-to-door and, profiting from word-of-mouth publicity he generated, gradually became more successful. In 1925 a news report suggested that he peddled his pictures "like a pushcart merchant". Working out of his basement studio on East 40th Street, he was also able to place his etchings in some of the art shops along 5th Avenue.

In 1923, a small publishing house run by Nicholas L. Brown published 10 of Dolice's etchings in a short guidebook by J. George Frederick called Adventuring in New York. The 10 Manhattan landmarks depicted included Columbia University's Butler Library, St. Patrick's Cathedral, and Madison Square Garden.

In August 1924, novelist and journalist Leonard Cline posted a column that noted Dolice's sales technique. He said the artist caused a stir when he visited the newspaper's city room to offer up copies of his etchings at 50 cents each. The prints included scenes of Washington Square Arch, the Woolworth Building, and the East River. Cline discussed one print at some length. This print, which Dolice called "The Misery", showed, as Cline said, "vague uncertainties" on a wall, including "vestiges from an earlier etching on the same plate, which had been polished down laboriously by an artist too poor to buy metal." When, in September, Dolice traveled to Baltimore, the Baltimore Sun interviewed him about his plans to make etchings of city landmarks and in November the paper reviewed an exhibition of the resulting prints at the Peabody Institute.

A year later, a reporter described Dolice's work on a studio he was setting up on East 40th Street in Manhattan. Working with castoffs from nearby construction sites, he improved the appearance of the bare walls of the basement room he had rented. When one of his etchings appeared in a large exhibition at the National Arts Club in 1926, he received more orders for prints than did better-known artists in the show. The etching, "Madison Square Garden", shown here, was an atmospheric depiction of the facade and towers with the Metropolitan Life Building looming in the distance.

Dolice continued to make and sell his pictures during the Great Depression of the 1930s. He spent the summer months of 1936 at a seaside resort called Long Branch on the New Jersey coast. He held an exhibition there at a nearby performing arts center called the Deal Conservatoire. Tired of the frivolity of the New York art scene, he made his home year-round a few miles south in Asbury Park. At the end of the decade, Dolice gave an interview to a local reporter in which he told how, in Asbury Park as he had in Manhattan, he would run a gallery in his studio to sell his art. By 1939, sales having dwindled, he shifted his creative output to the construction of interior decorations in metal. Summarizing his life in this period, he said that while he had earned little money, his memories were his wealth.

Dolice showed pastels at the Wadsworth Atheneum in Hartford, Connecticut, in 1943. Calling them "extraordinary and extremely beautiful", a critic for a local paper said Dolice had transformed the city canyons of New York into "glowing avenues of diffused color." By the end of the 1950s, Dolice was again running a personal gallery in his studio. In a small space called the Subterranean Gallery on Manhattan's Third Avenue near 31st Street, he showed works from other artists as well as his own.

Dolice died in New York on November 19, 1960. There have been no reports of major retrospective exhibitions since that date.

Two decades after he died, his works began showing up in art auctions. and in the 1990s they were included in group exhibitions devoted to urban scenes. In 1998 an arts council in the New York suburbs gave one of Dolice's etchings a prominent place in a centennial exhibition celebrating the union of New York's five boroughs. Called "Vintage New York", the show traveled to towns in the metro area suburbs and in 2003 appeared in New York's Grace Institute. A report of the exhibition in a local New Jersey paper included a reproduction of a Dolice etching called "East 34th Street" that showed a station on the 3rd Avenue El with the Empire State Building in the background. A Daily News report of the show at Grace Institute included a reproduction of the 1932 etching called "Little Church Around the Corner". Since that time, exhibitions that included works by Dolice have been mounted at Hofstra Museum, Long Island, NY; the Montauk Artists' Association, Montauk, NY; and Tribeca Gallery, New York City.

=== Artistic style ===
During travels in Europe before his emigration to the United States, Dolice learned from his observation of European art. After arriving in New York, his contacts with local artists and his own artistic instincts led him to develop a technique that evolved from literal realism toward a personal interpretation of American modernism. Throughout much of his career, he showed his subjects with modernist distortion. He adhered to this approach in his etchings, linocuts, and watercolors, but veered toward greater abstraction in some of his late oil paintings and pastels. Writing in 1924, one critic noted in his early etchings a "touch of idealism" akin to some of the prints made by James McNeill Whistler and another writer, who also saw affinities to Whistler, said he saw in them "certain singing qualities of light and shadow" that put them beyond strict architectural accuracy.

One writer discussed the unusual elements of design in a 1922 etching that Dolice called "The Misery". He called attention to the balance of the composition, the appearance of writing in one quadrant, and what he called "vague uncertainties". In discussing another 1922 etching—one showing boats on the East River— this writer called attention to the "sensitive composition" of foreground elements—a boom with its halyards—against a background cluster of docked sailboats.

A gouache and watercolor work of 1936 called "Downtown Manhattan" shows Dolice's approach to abstraction in that medium. A 1945 painting called "Rainy Day" shows an abstract treatment in oil. A 1945 pastel showing the Chrysler Building shows his handling of abstraction in that medium. In 1943, a critic said his pastels had a "light and atmosphere that stamp them beyond the ordinary, adding that in them, "city canyons absorb the brilliancy of sunlight that transforms them into glowing avenues of diffused color."

Although his main subjects were urban street scenes, he also made portraits, figure studies, and a few domestic interiors.

Early in his career, he told an interviewer why he preferred etching to other artistic media. He said, "While I paint in various mediums and do lithographic work, etching, a difficult process to many, is the most natural and congenial medium for art expression to me because of my intimate acquaintance with metals." Although he did not usually print his etchings in numbered editions, there is evidence that he made less than 75 impressions from most plates. After he had begun experimenting with linocuts in the 1930s, he told an interviewer that in that medium he could "obtain a variety of colors, composition, shading, atmosphere not possible in other mediums in the manner in which I want them."

After his sales of works on paper and canvas fell off in the mid-1930s, the metal-craft work he did to earn his living showed his tendency toward the fanciful in the utilitarian pieces he produced for interior designers.

== Personal life and family ==
Dolice was born on August 14, 1892, in Vienna, Austria. His birth name was Leon Louis Dolice. He was sometimes known as Louis or Louie. His father was a machinist and his grandfather a blacksmith. As an adult he was short, slender, and red-headed and had grey eyes. After arriving in New York and while he was establishing himself as a professional artist, he worked as a cook, as he had done on shipboard while living in Europe. Of his work as cook's assistant on his first ocean crossing, he told an interviewer, "Never had I cooked anything in my life. But I liked the work and I learned." His work as chef in New York included chef in the upscale Sherry's restaurant; chef in the Hotel New Netherland on 59th Street; chef in a hotel in Jersey City, night chef in the Waldorf Astoria, and roasting chef in the Biltmore.

In 1934, Dolice married Mary Lewandowska. She was a concert pianist and piano teacher. They had one child, a son, Joseph, born in 1941.

== Gallery ==
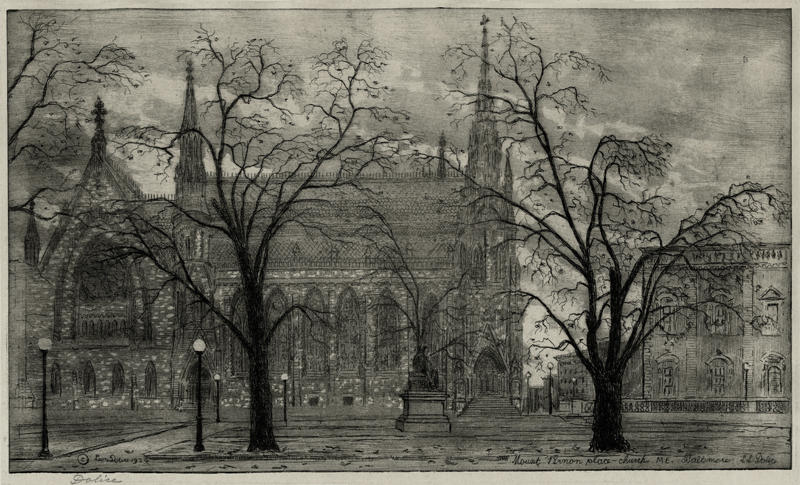
Mount Vernon Place, 1922, etching and aquatint

Empire State Building from Madison Square, about 1935, woodcut

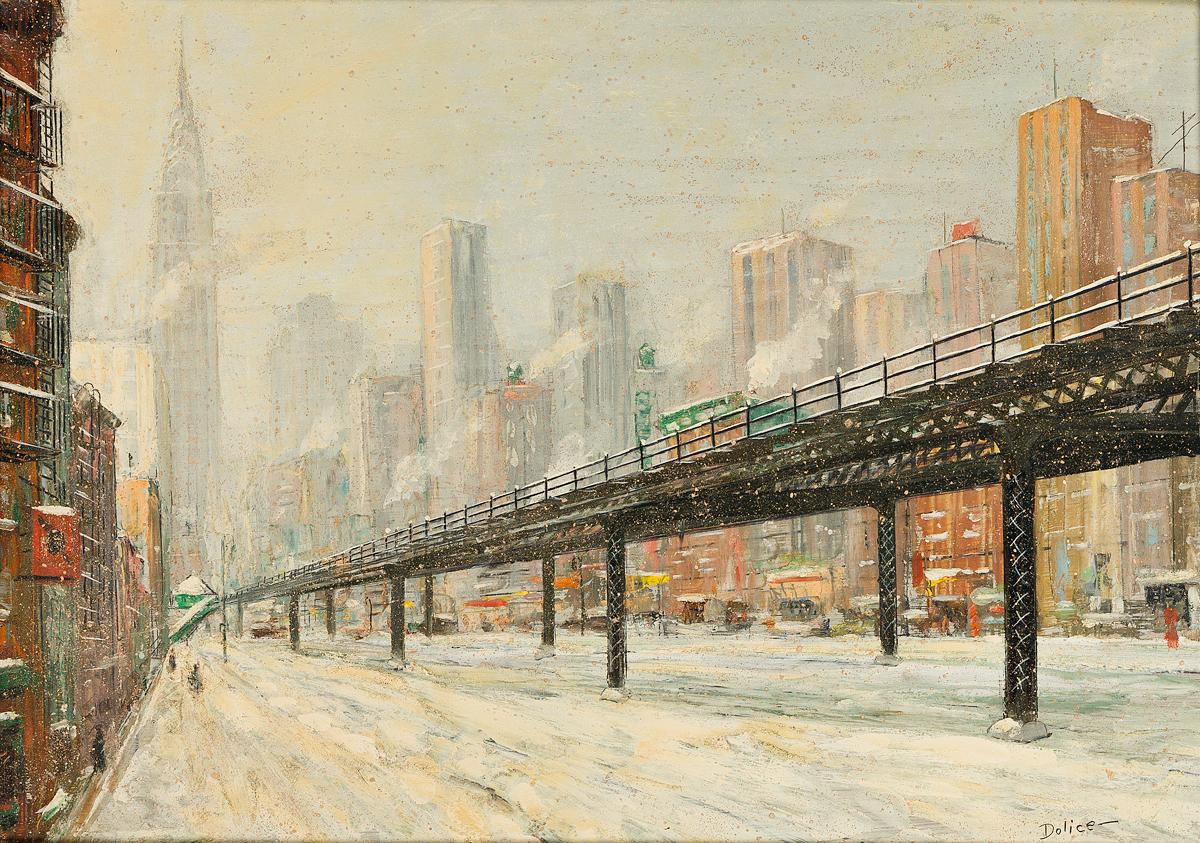
New York, Third Avenue El, about 1940, oil on board

Rainy Day, about 1940, oil on canvas board

Chrysler Building, about 1945, pastel

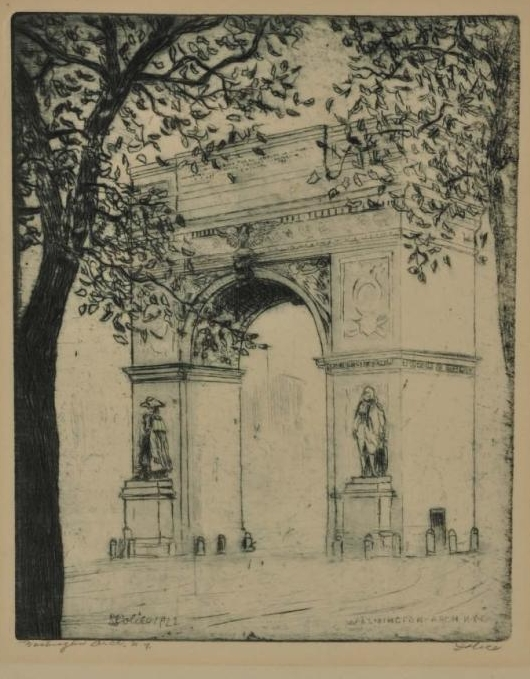
Washington Arch, 1922, etching

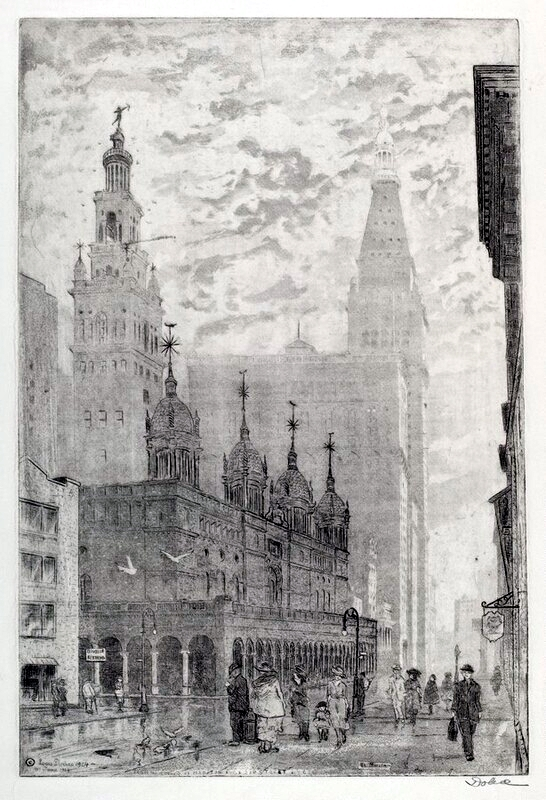
Madison Square Garden, 1924, etching
