= Lincoln Bible =

Bible used at Abraham Lincoln's inauguration

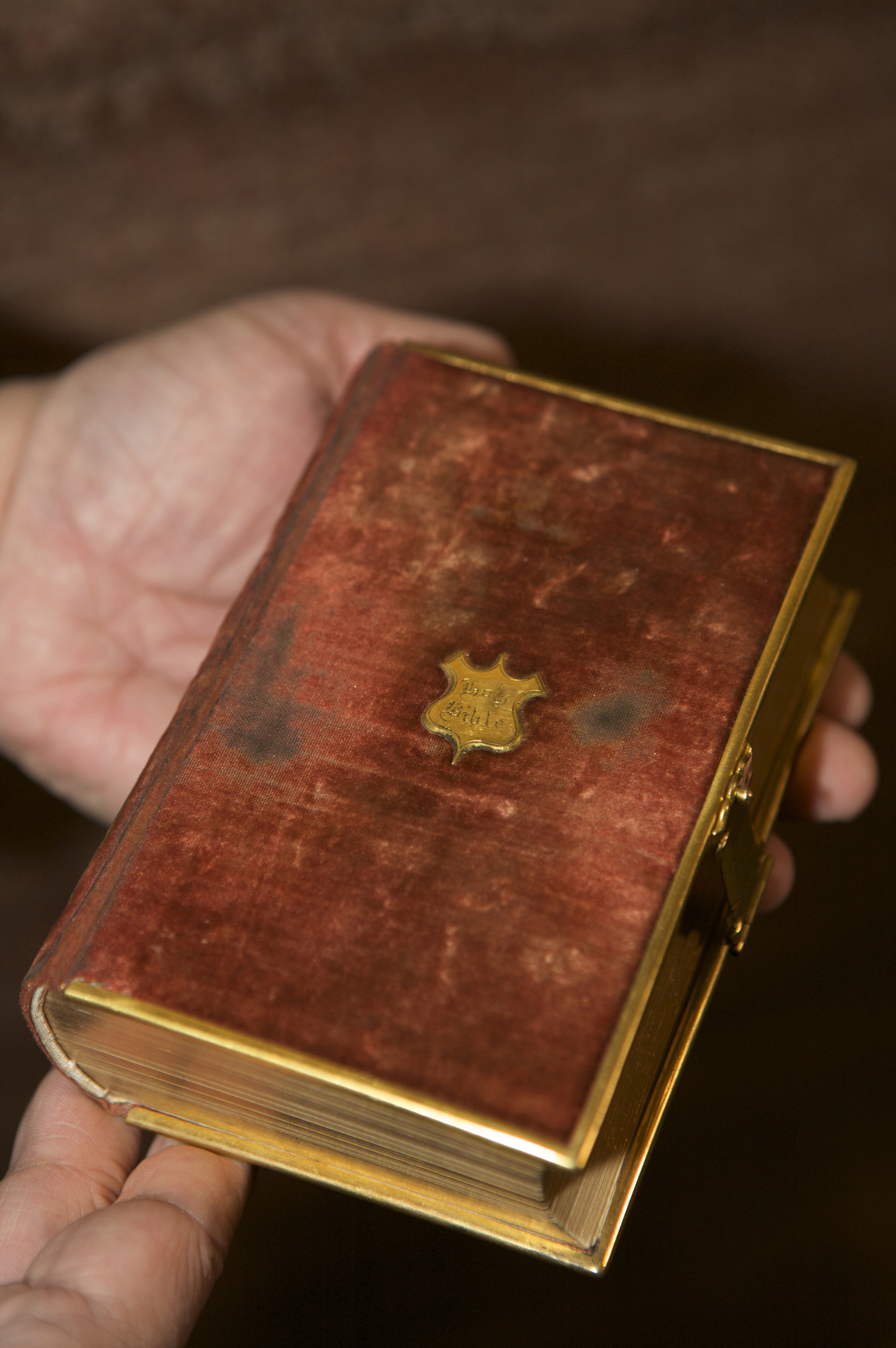
The Lincoln Bible

The Lincoln Bible is a Bible that was owned by William Thomas Carroll, a clerk of the U.S. Supreme Court. The bible was the oath book of President Abraham Lincoln at his inauguration in 1861. It was also used by President Barack Obama at his inaugurations in 2009 and 2013, as well as by President Donald Trump at his inaugurations in 2017 and 2025. The bible was returned to Carroll after Lincoln's first inauguration. He later gave it to the Lincoln family sometime after Lincoln's assassination. Mary Harlan Lincoln would later donate the Bible to the Library of Congress in 1928.

== Overview ==
The Bible is an Oxford University Press edition of the King James Bible. Published in 1853, it has 1280 pages, and measures approximately 6 inches (150 mm) long by 4 inches (100 mm) wide, and 1.75 inches (44 mm) thick, and is bound in burgundy red velvet with gilt edges. The back flyleaf of the Bible bears the seal of the Supreme Court of the United States along with a record of the 1861 inauguration. The Bible is not a rare edition, and a similar Bible lacking the Lincoln Bible's historical significance would be valued at approximately $30 or $40.

== History ==
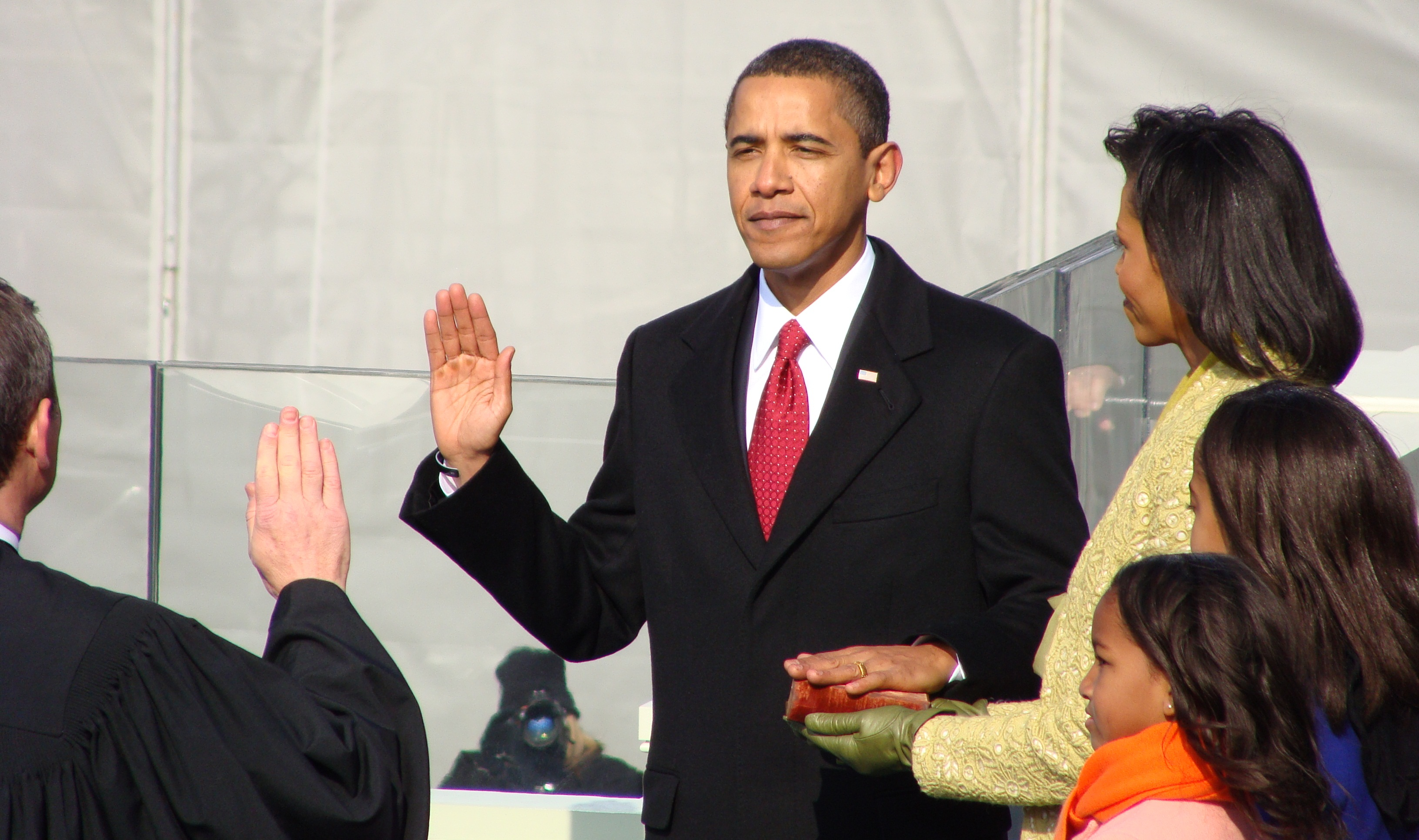
Barack Obama using the Lincoln Bible (being held by Michelle Obama) to take the oath of office at his first inauguration on January 20, 2009

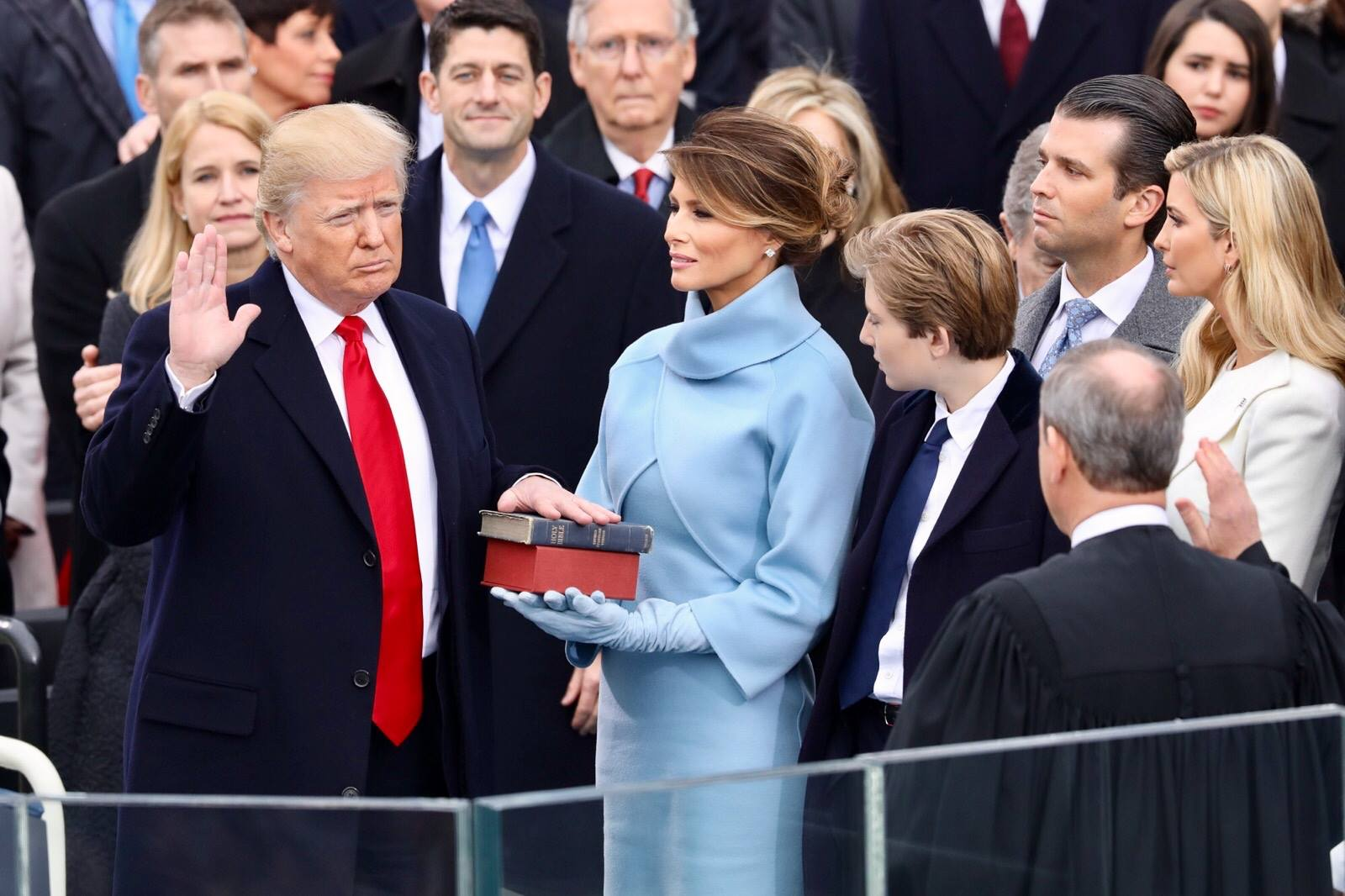
Donald Trump takes the oath of office on the Trump family Bible and the Lincoln Bible, January 20, 2017.

Abraham Lincoln reached Washington, D.C. for his inauguration in 1861. His belongings, including his Bible, had yet to arrive. William Thomas Carroll, the clerk of the U.S. Supreme Court, fetched a Bible that he kept for official use. This became the Lincoln Bible. Although the Bible remained with Carroll for a time, the Lincolns acquired it at an unknown time. The Bible later remained with the Lincoln family up until 1928, at which point Mary Eunice Harlan, the widow of Robert Todd Lincoln, donated it to the Library of Congress. When the Bible was donated, it contained markers at the 31st chapter of the Book of Deuteronomy and the fourth chapter of the Book of Hosea. The Telegraph Herald, commenting on this upon the donation, noted the resonance of Deuteronomy 31:6 and Hosea 4:1–3 to the tumult of the American Civil War.

Barack Obama chose to use this Bible for his inaugurations in 2009 and 2013. The Bible was on display at the Library of Congress from February to May 2009 in a celebration of the bicentennial of Lincoln's birth. The Bible was used to swear in Carla Hayden as the 14th Librarian of Congress on September 14, 2016. Donald Trump was sworn in on this Bible and his childhood Bible at his first inauguration on January 20, 2017. Trump used the Bible again, along with a childhood Bible given to him by his mother, at his second inauguration on January 20, 2025, though he did not place his hand on either Bible during the oath of office.

== See also ==
- United States presidential inauguration
- George Washington Inaugural Bible
- Religious views of Abraham Lincoln
