= St. John's Lodge (New York City) =

Masonic lodge in New York City

Coordinates: 40.742°N 73.992°W

St. John's Lodge No. 1 A.Y.M.
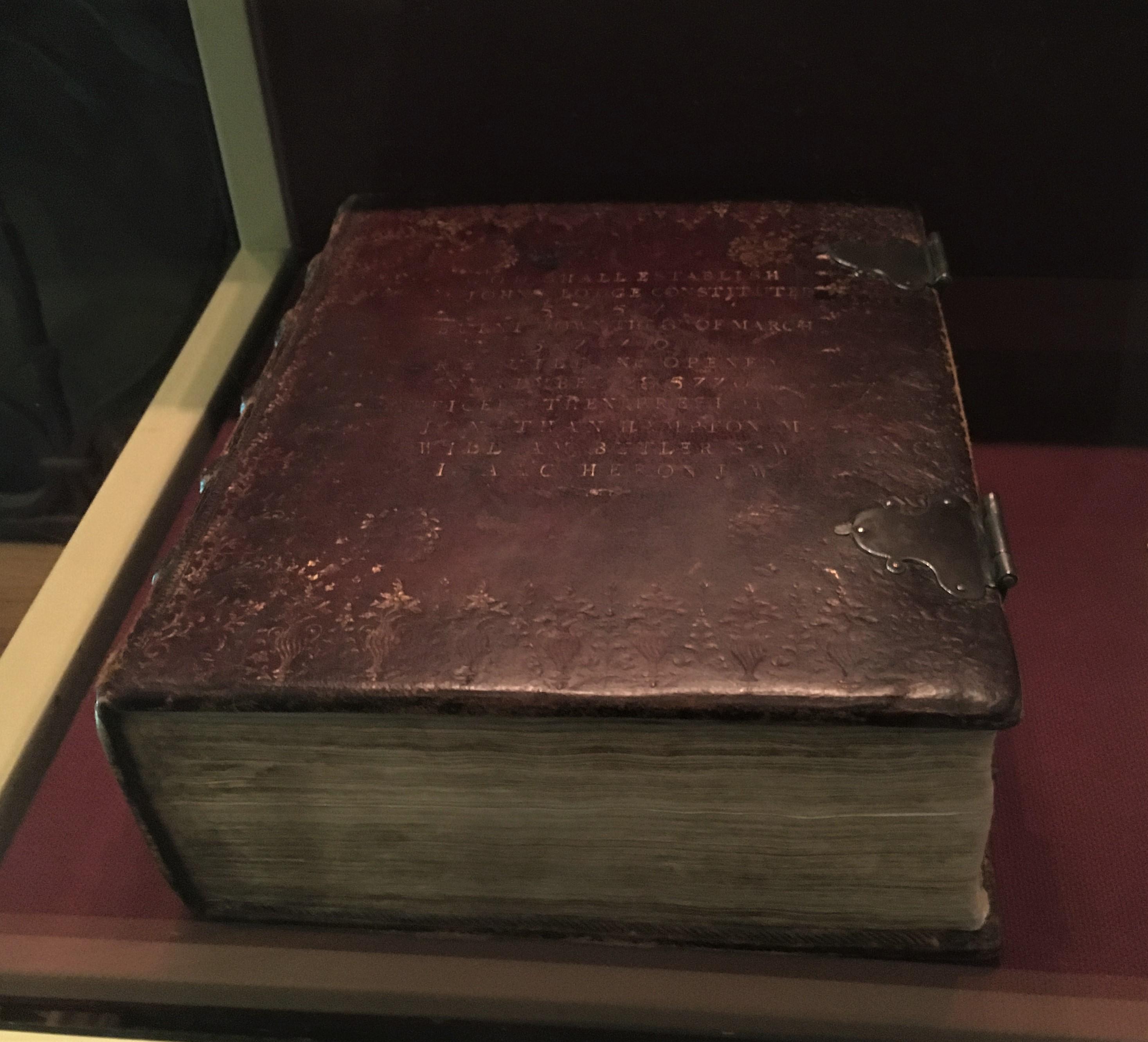
- George Washington Inaugural Bible
- Formation: December 7, 1757
- Location: New York City, New York
- Affiliations: Grand Lodge of New York
- Website: www.stjohns1.org

St. John's Lodge No. 1 A.Y.M. in New York City, United States, is the oldest operating Masonic Lodge under the jurisdiction of the Grand Lodge of New York Free and Accepted Masons. The lodge was originally warranted as St. John's Lodge No. 2 on December 7, 1757 by George Harison, Esq. of the Provincial Grand Lodge of New York under the Premier Grand Lodge of England, also known as the 'Moderns'.

== History ==
The lodge originally met on Ann Street in New York City. In 1770, a fire destroyed St. John's Lodge room, along with their lodge jewels and furniture. A new set of by-laws was adopted in 1773 and was signed by 70 members of the lodge. The lodge purchased a new altar bible in November 1770 which was used in the first Presidential Inauguration and is now known as the George Washington Inaugural Bible.

At the start of the American Revolutionary War in 1775, the members of St. John’s Lodge who supported the Colonies’ independence seized the lodge’s warrant, and fled New York City. These exiled members held gatherings at the Fishkill Supply Depot in Fishkill, New York, until the end of the war in 1783, when they returned to New York City with the warrant, while many Loyalist Masons who supported the British fled to Canada.

In 1789, St. John’s was acknowledged as the oldest Masonic lodge in New York State, and was designated as Number 1. A new charter was then conveyed to St. John’s Lodge, under which charter the lodge is still working.

== Notable members ==
- Edward Antill – Lt. Colonel in the Revolutionary War
- Abraham Baldwin – American Founding Father and first president of the University of Georgia
- Jacob Morton – Marshal for the First inauguration of George Washington
- John Ramage – Miniature artist and Second Lieutenant in the Revolutionary War
- José Miguel Carrera – Chilean general and one of the founders of independent Chile
