= John Ramage (artist) =

Irish American artist (1748–1802)

- John Ramage, self-portrait
- Born: 1748; Dublin, Ireland
- Died: 24 October 1802 (aged 53–54); Montreal, Lower Canada

John Ramage (1748 – 24 October 1802) was an Irish American artist, goldsmith, patroller, and second lieutenant. He was best known for painting portrait miniatures, and the first artist to paint a portrait of George Washington after he assumed office as the first President of the United States.

== Early life and education ==
Ramage was born in Dublin, Ireland. He entered the Dublin Society of Artists in 1763 and began his career as a goldsmith and miniaturist. John moved to Halifax, Nova Scotia, in 1772, where he was sued for small debts in that year and in 1774. After relocating to Boston in Massachusetts Bay Colony a year later, he painted miniatures on ivory, which was a very popular portrait style at the time.

Ramage joined "the Loyal Irish Volunteers", in December 1775, a military unit defending Boston on behalf of The Crown. He married Victoria Ball on 18 March 1776. Against United Colonies, Ramage, along with fellow Loyalist soldiers, evacuated from Boston to return to Halifax, Nova Scotia, Great Britain's stronghold on 27 March 1776, in the Siege of Boston. While in Halifax, he left Ball behind in Boston, to marry a woman whose real identity was never revealed, only known as "Mrs Taylor". They had two children together. Ball followed him to Halifax to obtain a divorce.

Ramage left Halifax and went to New York City in June 1777, "to avoid the further Pursuits of the Law", according to Reverend Mather Byles of Halifax. While in New York, he was promoted as a second lieutenant for the City Militia and joined St. John's Masonic Lodge. On 29 January 1787, he remarried for the third time, to Catharine Collins. Between them, they had three children.

== Career ==
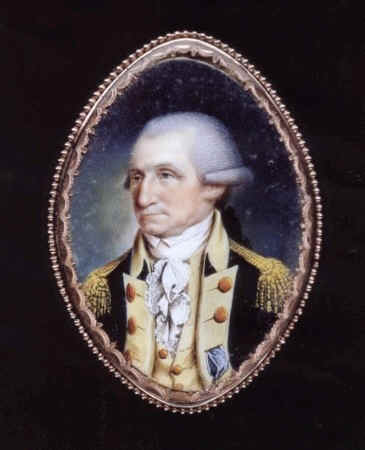
George Washington by John Ramage.

After serving as second lieutenant, he decided to work on miniatures in the artistic, but small community of New York. He was widely established as the best artist in the city. After painting numerous miniature portraits of New York citizens, Martha Washington, wife of George Washington, decided to select Ramage to be the first artist to paint the 1st President of the United States in office.

The sitting took place 3 October 1789, possibly at Washington's official residency at the Samuel Osgood House in New York City. Both Ramage and Washington were sharply dressed at the time of the sitting. Ramage developed two distinct miniatures of Washington.

Ramage used ivory and gold to create his elliptical shaped miniatures. For ivory, he used delicately shaded cross-hatching overlapped with fine and smooth linear strokes to model his subject's faces. With gold, he used festoons, stippled patterns, and chased scallops.

For George Washington, Ramage used a lock of Washington's hair with a meticulously cut "GW" cypher.

== Later life and death ==
Britain's evacuation of New York may have affected Ramage's business. In 1789, he was suing for bad debts. He ended up in dire straits in 1794. Fearful of imprisonment and debt, he fled to Montreal in 1794 to escape further debt. En route, he contracted a fever after nearly escaping drowning. His original plan was to go to Quebec to find encouragement from Lieutenant-Colonel George Beckwith, and an acquaintance from Boston, Thomas Aston Coffin. When he got to Montreal, he was in a state of "galloping consumption". In Lower Canada, he arrived during a period of political tension. American emissaries were cautious of British officials coming from the United States. After five weeks recovering from his fever, he found himself in jail. Ramage lamented to his wife, "I should have staid where I was, as I think the Accommodation in the gaol in New York is much better, which is all they Could do with me there." He was discharged from jail after a month, due to the grand jury favoring his loyalism during the American Revolution. He still held a grudge against the Montreal government as of 1795. Also in 1795, Ramage claimed he painted multiple paintings, although only being paid for two of them. In February 1796, he wrote that he did "Some very Extraordinary pictures Lately Sutch as was never Seen in Montreal before." In November 1797, he protested "Some things in your Letters that racks my very soul. Want of money has been the only thing that has Prevented me from flying to your Arms, as I have never been three weeks at a time in health Since I came to this Place, by my fretting and anxiety of mind for you and my Poor dear Children." He died there 24 October 1802, possibly due to his fever when en route to Montreal.

== Legacy ==
Ramage was friendless in Montreal, due to his disdain against his population during his exile. Only the rector, clark, and the sexton of Christ Church signed his burial record. Ramage's fortunes was decided by a land petition he sent in February 1802. He was granted 700 acres of land in Kilkenny Township. The town was erected 30 years later; by the time the town was established, Ramage's grant was left behind. Contemporary artist, William R. Dunlap said that Ramage was "the best artist in his branch in America."
