= Jacob Morton =

American lawyer, businessman, and militia general (1761–1836)

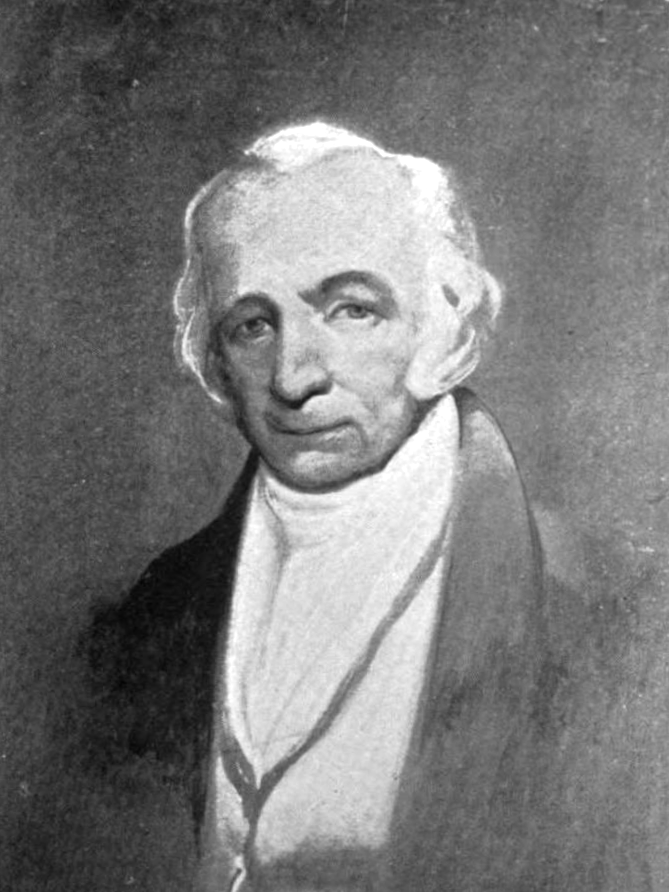
- Born: July 8, 1761; New York, New York
- Died: December 3, 1836 (aged 75); New York, New York
- Education: The College of New Jersey
- Occupations: Militia officer, lawyer and businessman
- Title: Commanding officer of the New York First Division
- Successor: Charles W. Sandford
- Relatives: George Clark Morton

Signature
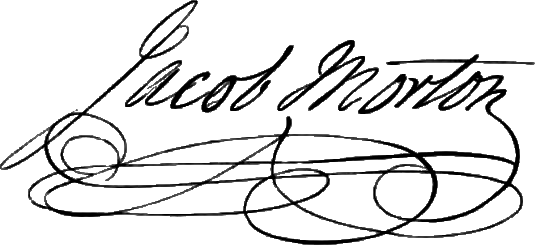

Major-General Jacob Morton (1761–1836) was an American military officer, lawyer, and businessman.

== Biography ==
Morton was born in New York City on July 8, 1761. (Note: Some sources give his birth year as 1762.) He studied law at The College of New Jersey, today Princeton University; however, Morton never practiced law.

In 1800, Morton was a Federalist candidate in New York's 2nd congressional district, narrowly losing to state assemblyman Samuel L. Mitchill by less than 100 votes.

Morton served as New York City Comptroller from 1807 to 1808. Morton was also later clerk for the New York City Common Council.

=== Freemasonry ===
Morton was an active Freemason. While serving as the marshal for the First inauguration of George Washington in 1789, he found that no Bible was available, and Morton retrieved the Lodge Bible from St. John's Lodge where he was the Worshipful Master. He later became the Grand Master of Grand Lodge of New York from 1801 to 1804.

In 1796, Jacob Morton was listed as the presiding officer of Ancient Encampment, Knights Templar in New York City, in its first published list of officers. He remained in that office until 1810, when all traces of the encampment were lost. In 1815, the Grand Encampment of Knights Templar of New York was created. On August 16, 1823, the Grand Encampment issued a warrant to Morton Encampment No. 4, now Morton Commandery No. 4, which was named in honor of General Morton.

Morton was promoted to brigadier-general in 1804. The Brigade he commanded was known as "Morton's Brigade of Artillery," which was the precursor for the Seventh Regiment of New York.

As Major-General, Morton led the New York Militia during the War of 1812.

He died in New York City on December 3, 1836.

== Legacy ==
The Grand Lodge of New York established an award named for Morton, known as the "Jacob Morton Award", given to Masons or Masonic Organizations that have demonstrated exceptional voluntary service to their community.
