= Inauguration of Harry S. Truman =

Inauguration of Harry S. Truman may refer to:

- First inauguration of Harry S. Truman, an intra-term inauguration held in 1945 after the death of Franklin D. Roosevelt
- Second inauguration of Harry S. Truman, a regular scheduled inauguration held in 1949
- Fourth inauguration of Franklin D. Roosevelt, in which he inaugurated as vice president in 1945
