= Inauguration of Dwight D. Eisenhower =

Inauguration of Dwight D. Eisenhower may refer to:

- First inauguration of Dwight D. Eisenhower, 1953
- Second inauguration of Dwight D. Eisenhower, 1957

== See also ==
- The full text of Dwight Eisenhower's First Inaugural Address at Wikisource
- The full text of Dwight Eisenhower's Second Inaugural Address at Wikisource
