= Inauguration of Richard Nixon =

Inauguration of Richard Nixon may refer to:

- First inauguration of Richard Nixon, 1969
- Second inauguration of Richard Nixon, 1973
- First inauguration of Dwight D. Eisenhower, in which he was inaugurated as vice president in 1953
- Second inauguration of Dwight D. Eisenhower, in which he was inaugurated as vice president in 1957

== See also ==
- The full text of Richard Nixon's First Inaugural Address at Wikisource
- The full text of Richard Nixon's Second Inaugural Address at Wikisource
