= Inauguration of Millard Fillmore =

2nd United States intra-term presidential inauguration

Presidential inauguration of Millard Fillmore
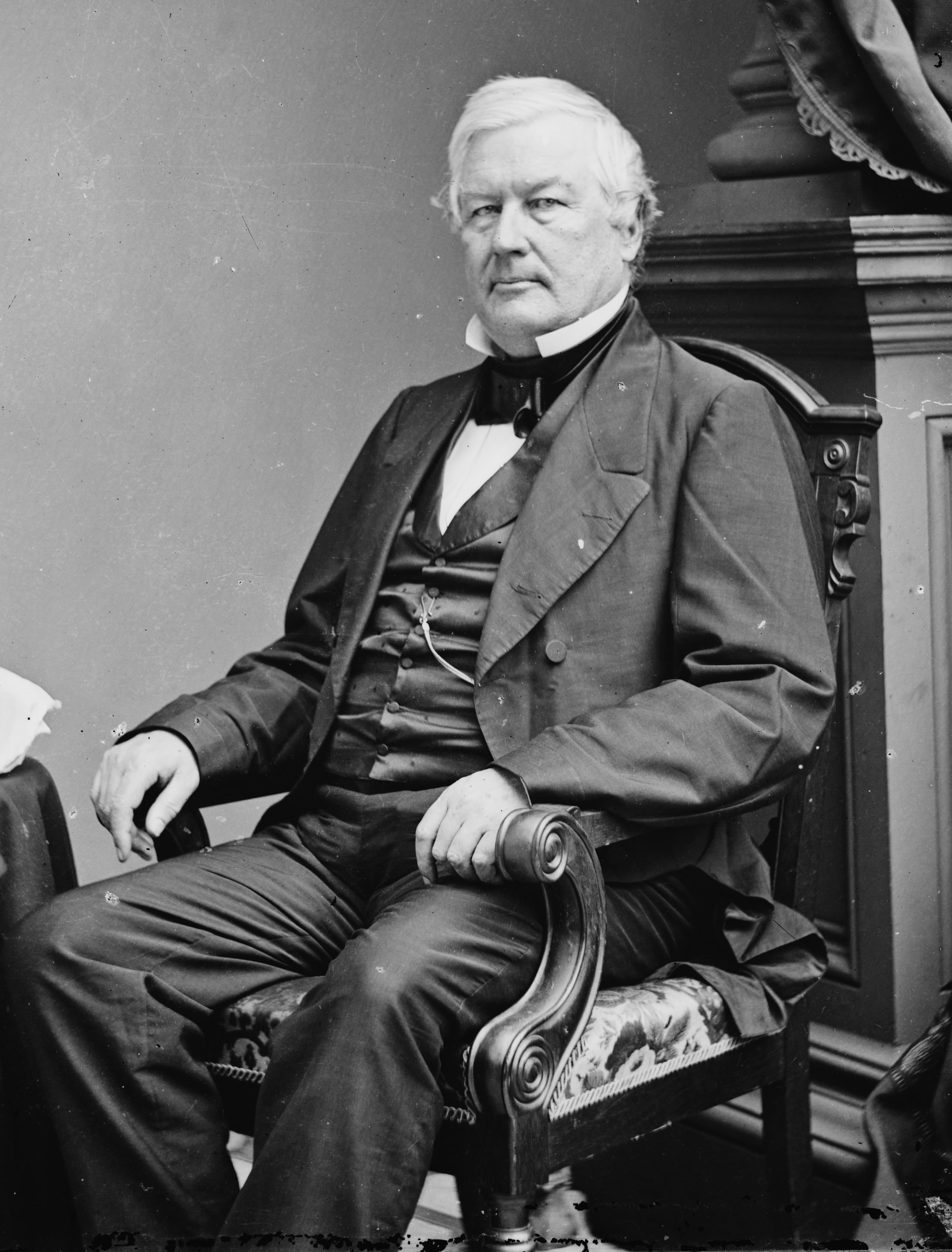
- Millard Fillmore
- Date: July 10, 1850; 176 years ago
- Location: United States Capitol, Washington, D.C.
- Participants: Millard Fillmore; 13th president of the United States — Assuming office William Cranch; Chief Judge of the United States Circuit Court of the District of Columbia — Administering oath

The inauguration of Millard Fillmore as the 13th president of the United States, was held on Wednesday, July 10, 1850, at the House chamber inside the United States Capitol in Washington, D.C., following the death of President Zachary Taylor the previous day. This inauguration – the second non-scheduled, extraordinary inauguration to ever take place – marked the commencement of Millard Fillmore’s only term (a partial term of 2 years, 237 days) as president.

During the inauguration, William Cranch, the chief judge of the U.S. Circuit Court of the D.C., administered the presidential oath of office to Fillmore. Cranch had also administered the oath to John Tyler in 1841, when Tyler succeeded to the presidency upon William Henry Harrison's death. Fillmore was the last president from neither the Democratic or Republican parties.

== See also ==
- Presidency of Millard Fillmore
- Bibliography of Zachary Taylor
- Bibliography of Millard Fillmore
