= Inauguration of Lyndon B. Johnson =

Inauguration of Lyndon B. Johnson may refer to:

- First inauguration of Lyndon B. Johnson, an intra-term inauguration held in 1963 after the assassination of John F. Kennedy
- Second inauguration of Lyndon B. Johnson, a regular scheduled inauguration held in 1965
- Inauguration of John F. Kennedy, in which he was inaugurated as vice president in 1961
