= Inauguration of George H. W. Bush =

51st United States presidential inauguration

Presidential inauguration of George H. W. Bush
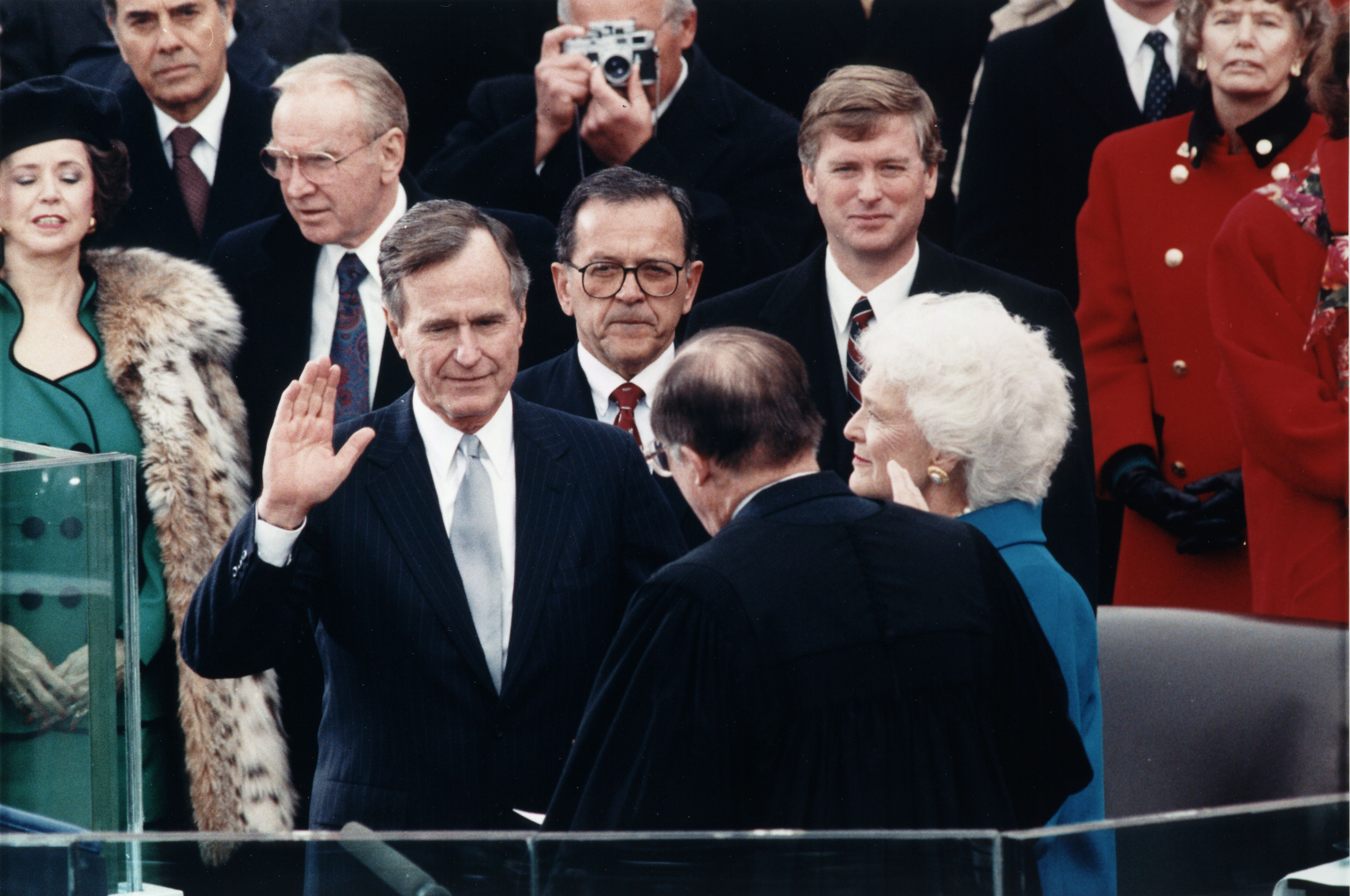
- George H. W. Bush takes the oath of office as the 41st president of the United States.
- Date: January 20, 1989; 37 years ago
- Location: United States Capitol, Washington, D.C.
- Organized by: Joint Congressional Committee on Inaugural Ceremonies
- Participants: George H. W. Bush; 41st president of the United States — Assuming office William Rehnquist; Chief Justice of the United States — Administering oath Dan Quayle; 44th vice president of the United States — Assuming office Sandra Day O'Connor; Associate Justice of the Supreme Court of the United States — Administering oath

The inauguration of George H. W. Bush as the 41st president of the United States was held on Friday, January 20, 1989, at the West Front of the United States Capitol in Washington, D.C. This was the 51st inauguration and marked the commencement of the only term of both George H. W. Bush as president and Dan Quayle as vice president. Chief Justice William Rehnquist administered the presidential oath of office to Bush and Justice Sandra Day O'Connor administered the vice presidential oath of office to Quayle. Bush was the first sitting vice president to be inaugurated as president (not due to his predecessor's death or resignation) since Martin Van Buren in 1837 and the last World War II combat veteran. Bush composed his own prayer for the ceremony which he recited at the start of his inaugural address; the last president to do so was Dwight D. Eisenhower at his first inauguration in 1953. Quayle was also the first vice president to have his oath administered by a female justice of the Supreme Court. This is the first inauguration since 1929 and the most recent in which the party of the outgoing president (in which case Ronald Reagan), was sworn in for another term.

The event helped the Washington Metro set a single-day record of 604,089 trips, breaking the record of 565,000 set the spring before by the Washington for Jesus '88 rally. The record would stand until the day of the National Victory Celebration in 1991.

Weather conditions for 12 noon at Washington National Airport, located 3.1 miles from the ceremony, were: 50 °F (10 °C), wind 18 mph, and cloudy.

== Oath of office ==
At noon, the oath of office was administered to Bush by Chief Justice William Rehnquist. Present were the members of Bush family as well as his wife Barbara.

Bush recited the following, as prescribed by the Constitution:

I, George Herbert Walker Bush, do solemnly swear that I will faithfully execute the Office of President of the United States, and will to the best of my ability, preserve, protect and defend the Constitution of the United States. [So help me God.]

== See also ==
- Presidency of George H. W. Bush
- Presidential transition of George H. W. Bush
- Timeline of the George H. W. Bush presidency (1989)
- 1988 United States presidential election
- George H. W. Bush 1988 presidential campaign
