= Oath of office of the president of the United States =

Oath taken by a new president of the United States

Chief Justice John Roberts administering the presidential oath of office to Donald Trump on January 20, 2025

The oath of office of the president of the United States is the oath or affirmation that the president of the United States takes upon assuming office. The wording of the oath is specified in Article II, Section One, Clause 8, of the United States Constitution, and a new president is required to take it before exercising or carrying out any official powers or duties.

This clause is one of three oath or affirmation clauses in the Constitution, but it is the only one that actually specifies the words that must be spoken. Article I, Section 3 requires Senators, when sitting to try impeachments, to be "on Oath or Affirmation." Article VI, Clause 3, similarly requires the persons specified therein to "be bound by oath or affirmation, to support this Constitution." The presidential oath requires much more than that general oath of allegiance and fidelity. This clause enjoins the new president to swear or affirm: "I will to the best of my ability, preserve, protect and defend the Constitution of the United States."

== Text ==
Before he enter on the Execution of his Office, he shall take the following Oath or Affirmation:— "I do solemnly swear (or affirm) that I will faithfully execute the Office of President of the United States, and will to the best of my ability, preserve, protect and defend the Constitution of the United States."

== Ceremony ==
Chief Justice Melville Fuller administering the presidential oath of office to William McKinley during his second inauguration; March 4, 1901. This was the first filmed presidential oath of office in U.S. history.

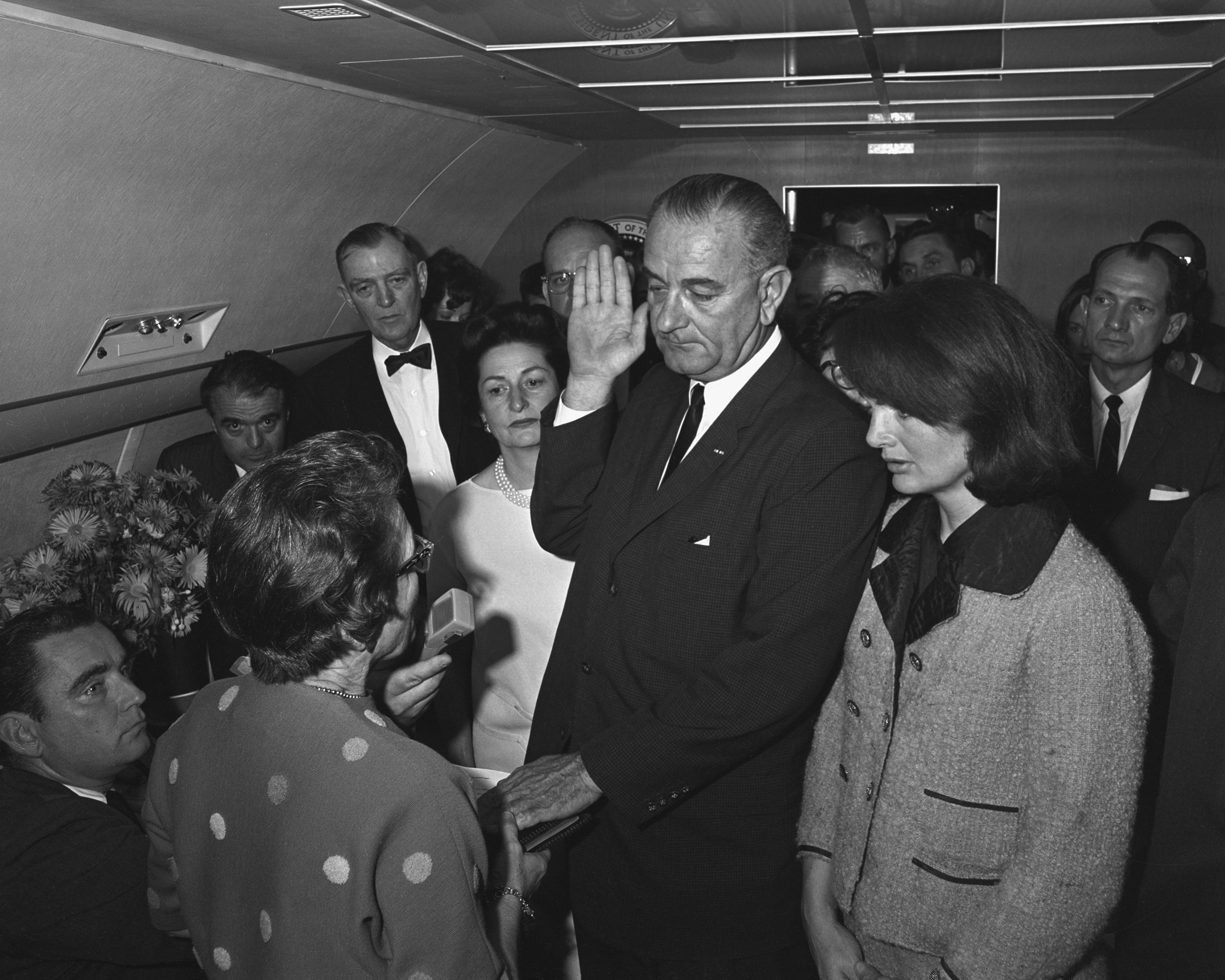
Federal judge Sarah T. Hughes administering the presidential oath of office to Lyndon B. Johnson following the assassination of John F. Kennedy, November 22, 1963

A newly elected or re-elected president of the United States begins his or her four-year term of office at noon on the twentieth day of January following the election, and, by tradition, takes the oath of office during an inauguration on that date; prior to 1937 the president's term of office began on March 4. If January 20 falls on a Sunday, the president will be sworn in that day by taking the oath privately, but will then re-take the oath in a public ceremony the next day, on January 21.

Nine vice presidents have succeeded to the presidency upon the death or resignation of the president. In these situations the oath of office was administered to the new president as quickly as possible, as doing so allowed the presidency to continue uninterrupted.

== Administration ==
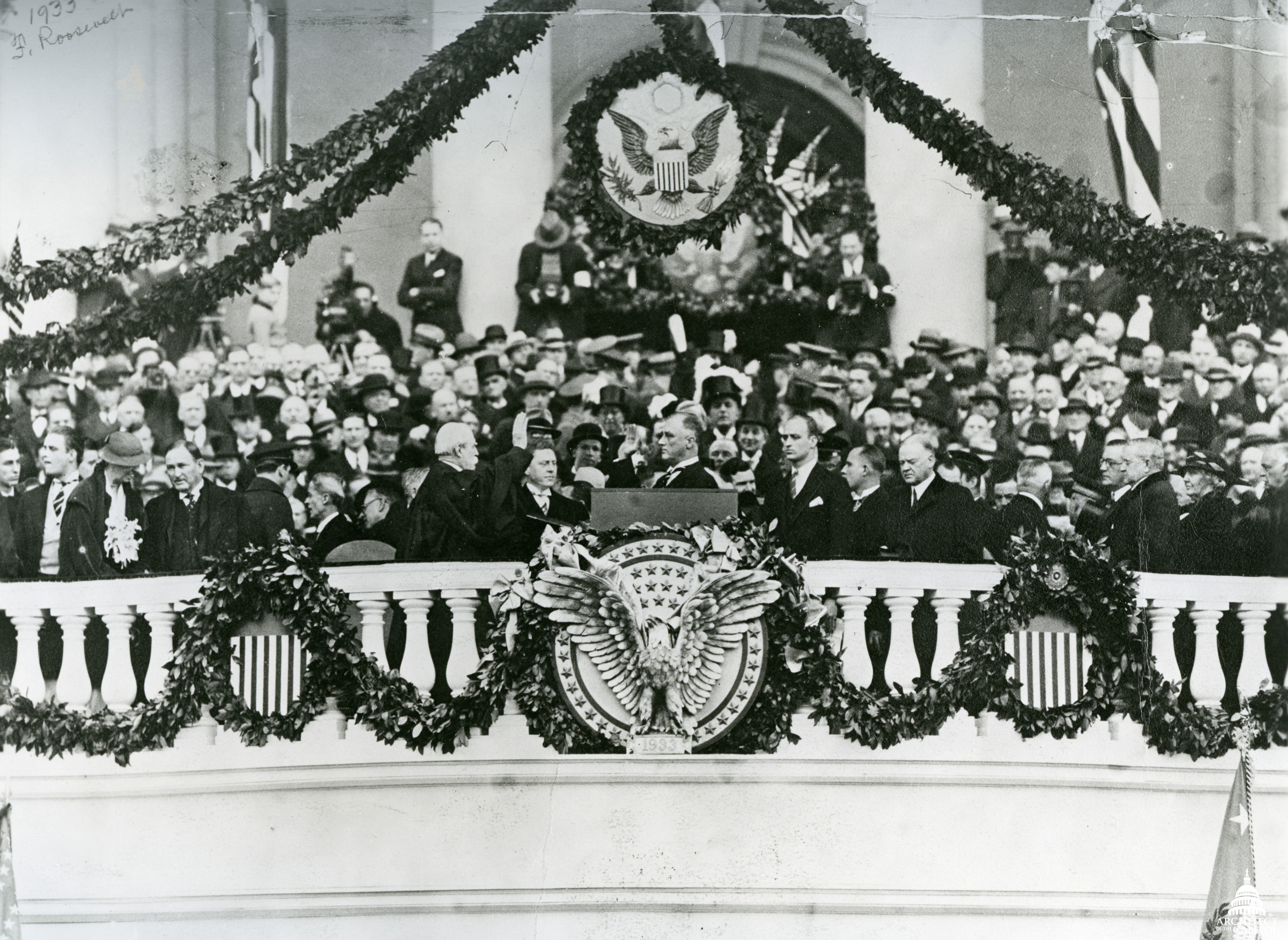
Franklin D. Roosevelt being administered the oath of office by Chief Justice Charles Evans Hughes on March 4, 1933, the first of Roosevelt's four presidential inaugurations

While the Constitution does not mandate that anyone in particular should administer the presidential oath of office, it has been administered by the chief justice beginning with John Adams, except following the death of a sitting president. George Washington was sworn into office by Chancellor of New York Robert Livingston at his first inauguration, on April 30, 1789, there being no Supreme Court or Chief Justice until after the Judiciary Act passed that September.

William Cranch, chief judge of the U.S. Circuit Court, administered the oath to Millard Fillmore on July 10, 1850, when he became president after the death of Zachary Taylor. Upon being informed of Warren Harding's death, while visiting his family home in Plymouth Notch, Vermont, Calvin Coolidge was sworn in as president by his father, John Calvin Coolidge Sr., a notary public (United States). Federal judge Sarah T. Hughes administered the oath of office to Lyndon B. Johnson aboard Air Force One after John F. Kennedy's assassination on November 22, 1963; the only time a woman has administered the oath of office. Overall, the presidential oath has been administered by 15 chief justices (one of whom—William Howard Taft—was also a former president), one associate justice, four federal judges, two New York state judges, and one notary public.

=== Option of affirmation ===
The Constitutional language gives the option to "affirm" instead of "swear." While the reasons for this are not documented, it may relate to certain Christians, including Quakers, who apply this scripture literally: "But above all things, my brethren, swear not, neither by heaven, neither by the earth, neither by any other oath: but let your yea be yea; and your nay, nay; lest ye fall into condemnation" (James 5:12, KJV). Affirming rather than swearing had been permitted in the Province of Pennsylvania, by the English parliament since the Quakers Act 1695, and by several post-1776 state constitutions. Franklin Pierce is the only president known to have used the word "affirm" rather than "swear." Herbert Hoover is often listed to have used "affirm" as well, owing to his being a Quaker, but a newsreel taken of the ceremony indicates that the words used were "solemnly swear." Richard Nixon, who was raised a Quaker, swore, rather than affirmed.

=== Forms ===
There have been two forms of administering, and taking, the oath of office.

Under the first form, now in disuse, the administrator articulated the constitutional oath in the form of a question, and modifying the wording from the first to the second person, as in, "Do you, George Washington, solemnly swear ..." and then requested an affirmation. At that point a response of "I do" or "I swear" completed the oath.

It is believed that this was the common procedure at least until the early 20th century. In 1881, the New York Times article covering the swearing in of Chester A. Arthur, reported that he responded to the question of accepting the oath with the words, "I will, so help me God." In 1929, Time magazine reported that Chief Justice William H. Taft began the oath uttering, "You, Herbert Hoover, do you solemnly swear ...", Hoover replied with a simple "I do."

Under the second, and current form, the administrator articulates the oath in the affirmative, and in the first person, so that the president takes the oath by repeating it verbatim. Franklin Roosevelt, in 1933, stood silent as Chief Justice Charles Evans Hughes recited the entire oath, then repeated that oath from beginning to end himself. By the time of Harry Truman's inauguration in 1949, the practice was for the chief justice to utter the oath in phrases, with the president repeating those phrases, until the oath was completed.

== Use of Bibles ==
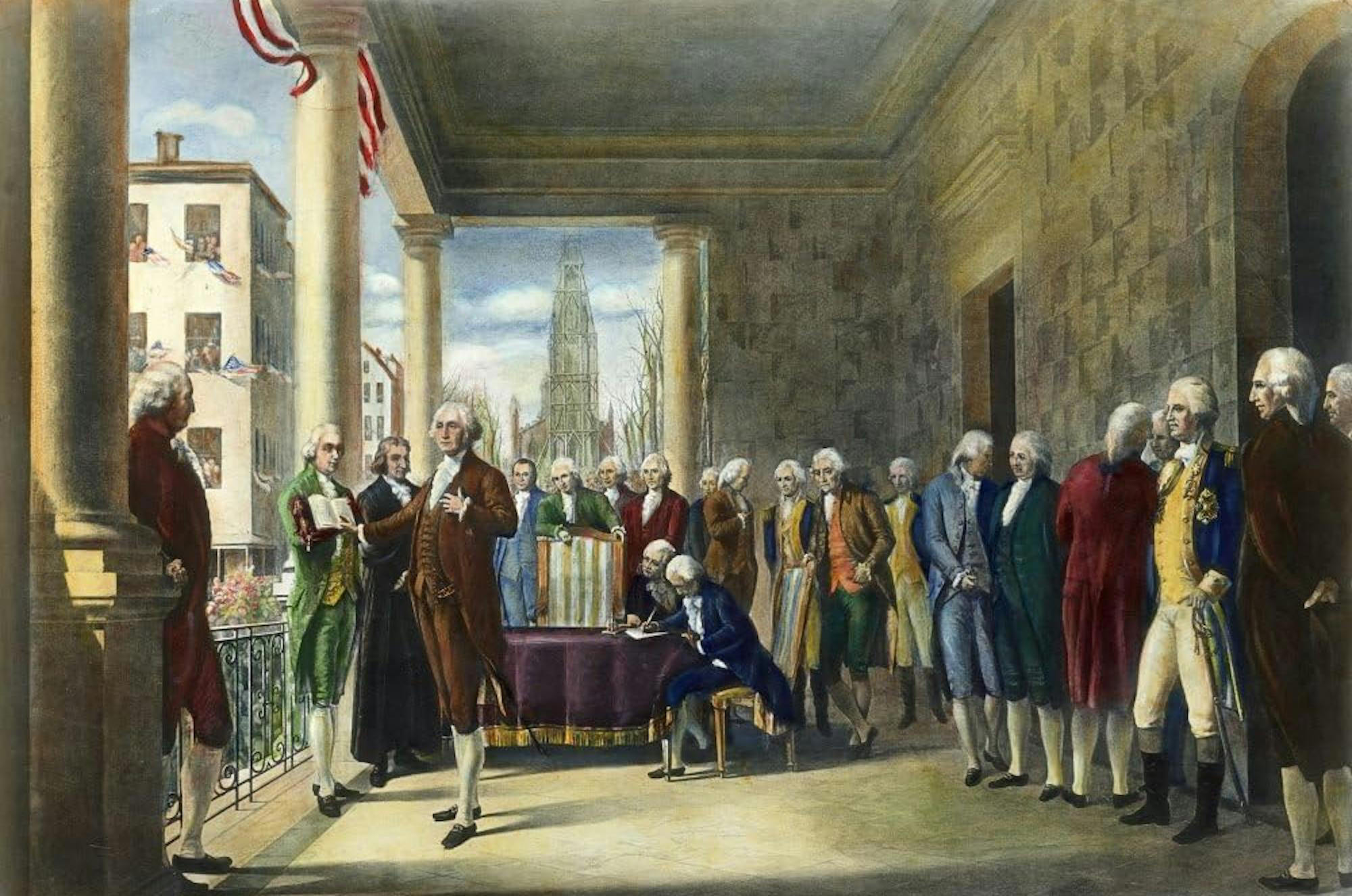
Painting of George Washington with his hand placed on a Bible while taking the presidential oath of office, April 30, 1789

By convention, incoming presidents raise their right hand and place the left on a Bible while taking the oath of office. In 1789, George Washington took the oath of office with an altar Bible borrowed from the St. John's Lodge No. 1, Ancient York Masons lodge in New York, and he kissed the Bible afterward.

Subsequent presidents up to and including Harry S. Truman, followed suit in kissing the Bible, although in 1953, Dwight D. Eisenhower said a prayer at the end instead. Truman, Eisenhower, Richard Nixon, George H. W. Bush, Barack Obama, and Donald Trump each swore the oath on two Bibles, although Trump did not actually touch either of the two bibles present at his second inauguration.

Theodore Roosevelt did not use the Bible when taking the oath in 1901, nor did John Quincy Adams, who swore on a book of law, with the intention that he was swearing on the Constitution. Lyndon B. Johnson was sworn in at his first inauguration on a Roman Catholic missal on Air Force One, believing it was a Bible, in the immediate aftermath of the assassination of John F. Kennedy.

== "So help me God" ==
The First Congress explicitly prescribed the phrase "So help me God" in oaths under the Judiciary Act of 1789 for all U.S. judges and officers other than the president. It was prescribed even earlier under the various first state constitutions as well as by the Second Continental Congress in 1776. Although the phrase is mandatory in these oaths, the said Act also allows for the option that the phrase be omitted by the officer, in which case it would be called an affirmation instead of an oath: "Which words, so help me God, shall be omitted in all cases where an affirmation is admitted instead of an oath." In contrast, the oath of the president is the only oath specified in the Constitution. It does not include the closing phrase "So help me God," and it also allows for the optional form of an affirmation which is not considered an oath. In practice, most presidents, at least during the last century, have opted to take the oath (rather than an affirmation), to use a Bible to do so, and also to close the oath with the customary phrase.

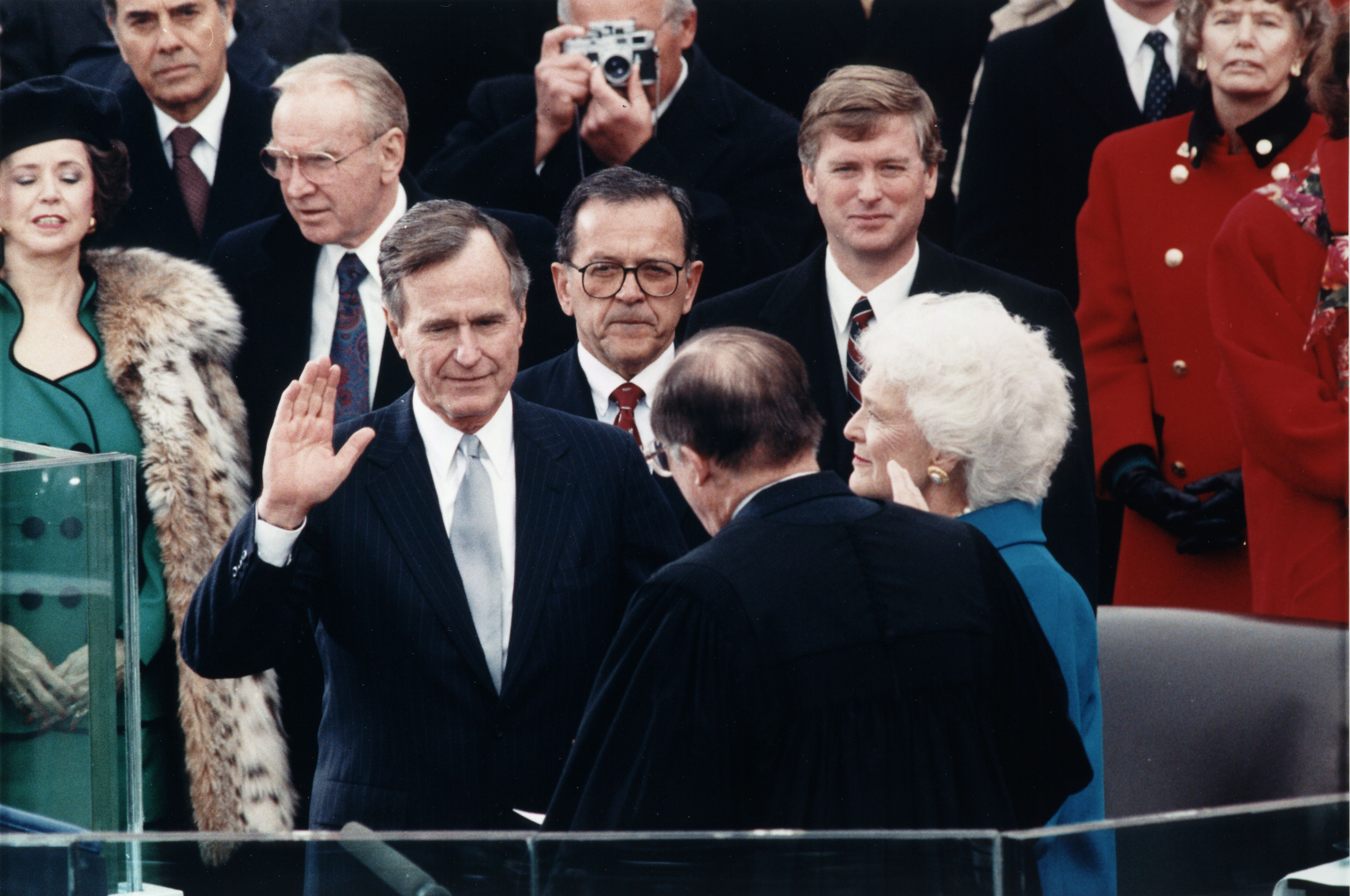
George H. W. Bush being administered the oath of office by Chief Justice William Rehnquist on January 20, 1989

There is currently debate as to whether or not George Washington, the first president, added the phrase to his acceptance of the oath. The earliest known source indicating Washington added "So help me God" to his acceptance, not to the oath, is attributed to Washington Irving, aged six at the time of the inauguration, and first appears 65 years after the event. The only contemporary account that repeats the oath in full, a report from the French consul, Comte de Moustier, states only the constitutional oath, without reference to Washington's adding "So help me God" to his acceptance.

The historical debate over who first used "So help me God" is marred by ignoring the two forms of giving the oath. The first, now in disuse, is when the administrator articulates the constitutional oath in the form of a question, as in, "Do you George Washington solemnly swear ...", requesting an affirmation. At that point a response of "I do" or "I swear" completes the oath. Without verbatim transcripts, the scant existing evidence shows this was the common procedure at least until the early 20th century. In 1865 the Sacramento Daily Union covered the second inauguration of Abraham Lincoln. Lincoln finished his oath with "So help me God," and he kissed the Bible. The Daily Union account is embellished in several ways, and other newspaper accounts published nearer to the ceremony do not mention the phrase (but they do not quote the oath in any form). In 1881, the New York Times article covering the swearing in of Chester A. Arthur reported that he responded to the question of accepting the oath with the words, "I will, so help me God." In 1929, Time magazine reported that the chief justice began the oath uttering, "You, Herbert Hoover, do you solemnly swear ..." Hoover replied with a simple "I do."

A contemporaneous newspaper account of Lincoln's 1865 inauguration states that Lincoln appended the phrase "So help me God" to the oath. This newspaper report is followed by another account, provided later in the same year after Lincoln's death (April 15, 1865), that Lincoln said "So help me God" during his oath. The evidence pertaining to the 1865 inauguration is much stronger than that pertaining to Lincoln's 1861 use of the phrase. Several sources claim that Lincoln said "So help me God" at his 1861 inauguration, yet these sources were not contemporaneous to the event. During the speech, Lincoln stated that his oath was "registered in Heaven," something some have taken as indicating he likely uttered the phrase "So help me God." Conversely, there was a claim made by A. M. Milligan (a Presbyterian minister who advocated for an official Christian U.S. government) that letters were sent to Abraham Lincoln asking him to swear to God during his inaugurations, and Lincoln allegedly wrote back saying that God's name was not in the Constitution, and he could not depart from the letter of that instrument.

Richard Gardiner's research published in the White House History Quarterly, November 2024, offers contemporary evidence for presidents who used the phrase going back to William Henry Harrison in 1841, and Andrew Jackson.

All federal judges and executive officers were required as early as 1789 by statute to include the phrase unless they affirmed, in which case the phrase must be omitted. Given that nearly every president-elect since President Franklin D. Roosevelt has recited the additional phrase, it is likely that the majority of presidents-elect have uttered it.

== Mishaps ==
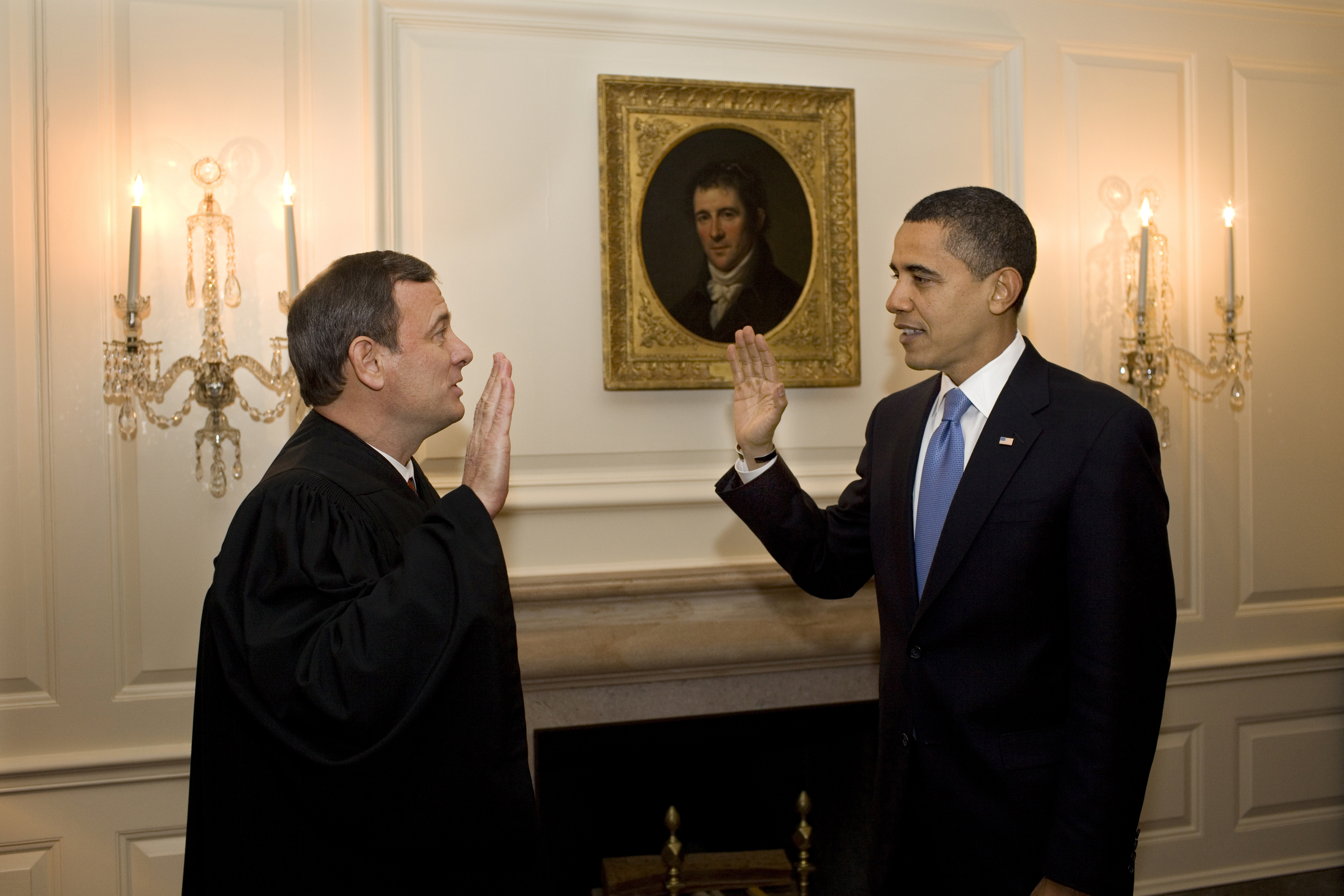
Barack Obama being administered the oath of office by Chief Justice John Roberts for the second time, on January 21, 2009

- In 1909, when President William Howard Taft was sworn in, Chief Justice Melville Fuller misquoted the oath, but the error was not publicized at the time. The mistake was similar to the one Taft himself would make twenty years later when, as Chief Justice, he swore in President Hoover. Recalling the incident, Taft wrote, "When I was sworn in as president by Chief Justice Fuller, he made a similar slip," and added, "but in those days when there was no radio, it was observed only in the Senate chamber where I took the oath."
- In 1925, Chief Justice Taft, himself formerly a president of the United States, administered the second oath of President Calvin Coolidge saying "...the office of the President of the United States" instead of "...the office of President of the United States", then continued the oath "and that to the best of my ability" instead of "and will to the best of my ability" as well as "...protect, preserve and defend" instead of the correct order "...preserve, protect and defend".
- Again in 1929, Chief Justice Taft famously garbled the oath when he swore in President Herbert Hoover saying "...the office of the President of the United States" instead of "...the office of President of the United States", then continued the oath "and to the best of my ability" instead of "and will to the best of my ability" as well as using the words "preserve, maintain, and defend the Constitution," instead of "preserve, protect, and defend the Constitution." Taft eventually acknowledged his error, but did not think it was important, and Hoover did not retake the oath. In Taft's view, his departure from the text did not invalidate the oath.
- In 1945, President Harry S. Truman's bare initial caused an unusual slip when he first became president and took the oath. At a meeting in the Cabinet Room, Chief Justice Harlan Stone, apparently mistaken about the meaning of Truman's middle initial (which is not an abbreviation but rather the whole middle name in itself), began reading the oath by saying "Do you, Harry Shipp Truman, ..." Truman responded: "I, Harry S. Truman, ..."
- In both his 1953 and 1957 inaugurations, Dwight D. Eisenhower read the line "the office of President of the United States" as "the office of the President of the United States," even as chief justices Fred Vinson (in 1953) and Earl Warren (in 1957) said the line correctly.
- In 1965, Chief Justice Earl Warren prompted Lyndon B. Johnson to say, "the Office of the Presidency of the United States."
- In 1973, President Richard Nixon added the word "and" between "preserve" and "protect," resulting in "preserve and protect, and defend the Constitution of the United States." Nixon had recited the line correctly during his first inauguration.
- In 2009, Chief Justice John Roberts, while administering the oath to Barack Obama, incorrectly recited part of the oath. Roberts prompted, "That I will execute the Office of President to the United States faithfully." Obama stopped at "execute," and waited for Roberts to correct himself. Roberts, after a false start, then followed Obama's "execute" with "faithfully," which results in "execute faithfully," which is also incorrect. Obama then repeated Roberts' initial, incorrect prompt, with the word "faithfully" after "United States." The oath was re-administered the next day by Roberts at the White House. This incident provided for the title and much of the content of Jeffrey Toobin's 2012 book The Oath: The Obama White House and the Supreme Court.

== List of ceremonies ==
Since the office of President of the United States came into existence in 1789 there have been 60 public swearing-in ceremonies to mark the commencement of a new four-year presidential term, plus an additional nine marking the start of a partial presidential term following the intra-term death or resignation of an incumbent president. With the 2025 inauguration of Donald Trump, the presidential oath has been taken 77 different times by 45 (Note: As of 2025. While there have been 47 presidencies, only 45 individuals have served as president. Two presidents have served non-consecutive terms: Grover Cleveland is numbered as both the 22nd and 24th U.S. president, and Donald Trump is numbered as both the 45th and 47th U.S. president.) persons. This numerical discrepancy results chiefly from two factors: a president must take the oath at the beginning of each term of office, and, because Inauguration Day has sometimes fallen on a Sunday, five presidents have taken the oath privately before the public inauguration ceremony. In addition, three have repeated the oath as a precaution against potential later constitutional challenges.

Date	Type	Event (Note: Inaugurations sort alphabetically by president's last name.)	Location	Oath administered by
April 30, 1789 (Thursday)	Public	First inauguration of George Washington	Balcony, Federal Hall; New York, New York	Robert Livingston; Chancellor of New York
March 4, 1793 (Monday)	Public	Second inauguration of George Washington	Senate Chamber, Congress Hall; Philadelphia, Pennsylvania	William Cushing; Associate Justice, U.S. Supreme Court
March 4, 1797 (Saturday)	Public	Inauguration of John Adams	House Chamber, Congress Hall	Oliver Ellsworth; Chief Justice of the United States
March 4, 1801 (Wednesday)	Public	First inauguration of Thomas Jefferson	Senate Chamber, U.S. Capitol; Washington, D.C.	John Marshall; Chief Justice of the United States
March 4, 1805 (Monday)	Public	Second inauguration of Thomas Jefferson	Senate Chamber, U.S. Capitol	John Marshall; Chief Justice of the United States
March 4, 1809 (Saturday)	Public	First inauguration of James Madison	House Chamber, U.S. Capitol	John Marshall; Chief Justice of the United States
March 4, 1813 (Thursday)	Public	Second inauguration of James Madison	House Chamber, U.S. Capitol	John Marshall; Chief Justice of the United States
March 4, 1817 (Tuesday)	Public	First inauguration of James Monroe	Front steps, Old Brick Capitol	John Marshall; Chief Justice of the United States
March 5, 1821 (Note: Term began Sunday, March 4.) (Monday)	Public	Second inauguration of James Monroe	House Chamber, U.S. Capitol	John Marshall; Chief Justice of the United States
March 4, 1825 (Friday)	Public	Inauguration of John Quincy Adams	House Chamber, U.S. Capitol	John Marshall; Chief Justice of the United States
March 4, 1829 (Wednesday)	Public	First inauguration of Andrew Jackson	East Portico, U.S. Capitol	John Marshall; Chief Justice of the United States
March 4, 1833 (Monday)	Public	Second inauguration of Andrew Jackson	House Chamber, U.S. Capitol	John Marshall; Chief Justice of the United States
March 4, 1837 (Saturday)	Public	Inauguration of Martin Van Buren	East Portico, U.S. Capitol	Roger B. Taney; Chief Justice of the United States
March 4, 1841 (Thursday)	Public	Inauguration of William Henry Harrison	East Portico, U.S. Capitol	Roger B. Taney; Chief Justice of the United States
April 6, 1841 (Note: Term began when President Harrison died on April 4.) (Tuesday)	Private	Inauguration of John Tyler	Brown's Indian Queen Hotel, Washington, D.C.	William Cranch; Chief Judge, U.S. Circuit Court of the District of Columbia
March 4, 1845 (Tuesday)	Public	Inauguration of James K. Polk	East Portico, U.S. Capitol	Roger B. Taney; Chief Justice
March 5, 1849 (Monday)	Public	Inauguration of Zachary Taylor	East Portico, U.S. Capitol	Roger B. Taney; Chief Justice
July 10, 1850 (Note: Term began when President Taylor died on July 9.) (Wednesday)	Public	Inauguration of Millard Fillmore	House Chamber, U.S. Capitol	William Cranch; Circuit Court Judge
March 4, 1853 (Friday)	Public	Inauguration of Franklin Pierce	East Portico, U.S. Capitol	Roger B. Taney; Chief Justice
March 4, 1857 (Wednesday)	Public	Inauguration of James Buchanan	East Portico, U.S. Capitol	Roger B. Taney; Chief Justice
March 4, 1861 (Monday)	Public	First inauguration of Abraham Lincoln	East Portico, U.S. Capitol	Roger B. Taney; Chief Justice
March 4, 1865 (Saturday)	Public	Second inauguration of Abraham Lincoln	East Portico, U.S. Capitol	Salmon P. Chase; Chief Justice of the United States
April 15, 1865 (Saturday)	Private	Inauguration of Andrew Johnson	Kirkwood House Hotel, Washington, D.C.	Salmon P. Chase; Chief Justice of the United States
March 4, 1869 (Thursday)	Public	First inauguration of Ulysses S. Grant	East Portico, U.S. Capitol	Salmon P. Chase; Chief Justice of the United States
March 4, 1873 (Tuesday)	Public	Second inauguration of Ulysses S. Grant	East Portico, U.S. Capitol	Salmon P. Chase; Chief Justice of the United States
March 3, 1877 (Saturday)	Private	Inauguration of Rutherford B. Hayes	Red Room, White House	Morrison Waite; Chief Justice of the United States
March 5, 1877 (Monday)	Public	Inauguration of Rutherford B. Hayes	East Portico, U.S. Capitol	Morrison Waite; Chief Justice of the United States
March 4, 1881 (Friday)	Public	Inauguration of James A. Garfield	East Portico, U.S. Capitol	Morrison Waite; Chief Justice of the United States
September 20, 1881 (Note: Term began when President Garfield died on September 19.) (Tuesday)	Private	Inauguration of Chester A. Arthur	Chester A. Arthur Home, New York, New York	John R. Brady; Justice of the New York Supreme Court
September 22, 1881 (Thursday)	Public	Inauguration of Chester A. Arthur	The Vice President's Room, U.S. Capitol	Morrison Waite; Chief Justice
March 4, 1885 (Wednesday)	Public	First inauguration of Grover Cleveland	East Portico, U.S. Capitol	Morrison Waite; Chief Justice
March 4, 1889 (Monday)	Public	Inauguration of Benjamin Harrison	East Portico, U.S. Capitol	Melville Fuller; Chief Justice of the United States
March 4, 1893 (Saturday)	Public	Second inauguration of Grover Cleveland	East Portico, U.S. Capitol	Melville Fuller; Chief Justice of the United States
March 4, 1897 (Thursday)	Public	First inauguration of William McKinley	Front of original Senate Wing; U.S. Capitol	Melville Fuller; Chief Justice of the United States
March 4, 1901 (Monday)	Public	Second inauguration of William McKinley	East Portico, U.S. Capitol	Melville Fuller; Chief Justice of the United States
September 14, 1901 (Saturday)	Private	First inauguration of Theodore Roosevelt	Ansley Wilcox Home, Buffalo, New York	John R. Hazel; Judge, U.S. District Court for the Western District of New York
March 4, 1905 (Saturday)	Public	Second inauguration of Theodore Roosevelt	East Portico, U.S. Capitol	Melville Fuller; Chief Justice
March 4, 1909 (Thursday)	Public	Inauguration of William Howard Taft	Senate Chamber, U.S. Capitol	Melville Fuller; Chief Justice
March 4, 1913 (Tuesday)	Public	First inauguration of Woodrow Wilson	East Portico, U.S. Capitol	Edward D. White; Chief Justice of the United States
March 4, 1917 (Sunday)	Private	Second inauguration of Woodrow Wilson	The President's Room, U.S. Capitol	Edward D. White; Chief Justice of the United States
March 5, 1917 (Monday)	Public	Second inauguration of Woodrow Wilson	East Portico, U.S. Capitol	Edward D. White; Chief Justice of the United States
March 4, 1921 (Friday)	Public	Inauguration of Warren G. Harding	East Portico, U.S. Capitol	Edward D. White; Chief Justice of the United States
August 3, 1923 (Note: Term began when President Harding died on August 2.) (Friday)	Private	First inauguration of Calvin Coolidge	Coolidge Homestead, Plymouth Notch, Vermont	John Calvin Coolidge; Vermont Justice of the peace
August 21, 1923 (Tuesday)	Private	First inauguration of Calvin Coolidge	Willard Hotel; Washington, D.C.	Adolph A. Hoehling Jr. Judge, U.S. District Court for the District of Columbia
March 4, 1925 (Wednesday)	Public	Second inauguration of Calvin Coolidge	East Portico, U.S. Capitol	William H. Taft; Chief Justice of the United States
March 4, 1929 (Monday)	Public	Inauguration of Herbert Hoover	East Portico, U.S. Capitol	William H. Taft; Chief Justice of the United States
March 4, 1933 (Saturday)	Public	First inauguration of Franklin D. Roosevelt	East Portico, U.S. Capitol	Charles E. Hughes; Chief Justice of the United States
January 20, 1937 (Wednesday)	Public	Second inauguration of Franklin D. Roosevelt	East Portico, U.S. Capitol	Charles E. Hughes; Chief Justice of the United States
January 20, 1941 (Monday)	Public	Third inauguration of Franklin D. Roosevelt	East Portico, U.S. Capitol	Charles E. Hughes; Chief Justice of the United States
January 20, 1945 (Saturday)	Public	Fourth inauguration of Franklin D. Roosevelt	South Portico, White House	Harlan F. Stone; Chief Justice of the United States
April 12, 1945 (Thursday)	Private	First inauguration of Harry S. Truman	Cabinet Room, White House	Harlan F. Stone; Chief Justice of the United States
January 20, 1949 (Thursday)	Public	Second inauguration of Harry S. Truman	East Portico, U.S. Capitol	Fred M. Vinson; Chief Justice of the United States
January 20, 1953 (Tuesday)	Public	First inauguration of Dwight D. Eisenhower	East Portico, U.S. Capitol	Fred M. Vinson; Chief Justice of the United States
January 20, 1957 (Sunday)	Private	Second inauguration of Dwight D. Eisenhower	East Room, White House	Earl Warren; Chief Justice of the United States
January 21, 1957 (Note: Term began Sunday, January 20.) (Monday)	Public	Second inauguration of Dwight D. Eisenhower	East Portico, U.S. Capitol	Earl Warren; Chief Justice of the United States
January 20, 1961 (Friday)	Public	Inauguration of John F. Kennedy	East Portico, U.S. Capitol	Earl Warren; Chief Justice of the United States
November 22, 1963 (Friday)	Private	First inauguration of Lyndon B. Johnson	Air Force One, Dallas Love Field, Dallas, Texas	Sarah T. Hughes; Judge, U.S. District Court for the Northern District of Texas
January 20, 1965 (Wednesday)	Public	Second inauguration of Lyndon B. Johnson	East Portico, U.S. Capitol	Earl Warren; Chief Justice
January 20, 1969 (Monday)	Public	First inauguration of Richard Nixon	East Portico, U.S. Capitol	Earl Warren; Chief Justice
January 20, 1973 (Saturday)	Public	Second inauguration of Richard Nixon	East Portico, U.S. Capitol	Warren Burger; Chief Justice of the United States
August 9, 1974 (Friday)	Public	Inauguration of Gerald Ford	East Room, White House	Warren Burger; Chief Justice of the United States
January 20, 1977 (Thursday)	Public	Inauguration of Jimmy Carter	East Portico, U.S. Capitol	Warren Burger; Chief Justice of the United States
January 20, 1981 (Tuesday)	Public	First inauguration of Ronald Reagan	West Front, U.S. Capitol	Warren Burger; Chief Justice of the United States
January 20, 1985 (Sunday)	Private	Second inauguration of Ronald Reagan	Entrance Hall, White House	Warren Burger; Chief Justice of the United States
January 21, 1985 (Monday)	Public	Second inauguration of Ronald Reagan	Rotunda, U.S. Capitol	Warren Burger; Chief Justice of the United States
January 20, 1989 (Friday)	Public	Inauguration of George H. W. Bush	West Front, U.S. Capitol	William Rehnquist; Chief Justice of the United States
January 20, 1993 (Wednesday)	Public	First inauguration of Bill Clinton	West Front, U.S. Capitol	William Rehnquist; Chief Justice of the United States
January 20, 1997 (Monday)	Public	Second inauguration of Bill Clinton	West Front, U.S. Capitol	William Rehnquist; Chief Justice of the United States
January 20, 2001 (Saturday)	Public	First inauguration of George W. Bush	West Front, U.S. Capitol	William Rehnquist; Chief Justice of the United States
January 20, 2005 (Thursday)	Public	Second inauguration of George W. Bush	West Front, U.S. Capitol	William Rehnquist; Chief Justice of the United States
January 20, 2009 (Tuesday)	Public	First inauguration of Barack Obama	West Front, U.S. Capitol	John Roberts; Chief Justice of the United States
January 21, 2009 (Note: Term began formally Tuesday, January 20, despite the "mishap" of the public oath being repeated correctly in private the next day.) (Wednesday)	Private	First inauguration of Barack Obama	Map Room, White House	John Roberts; Chief Justice of the United States
January 20, 2013 (Sunday)	Private	Second inauguration of Barack Obama	Blue Room, White House	John Roberts; Chief Justice of the United States
January 21, 2013 (Monday)	Public	Second inauguration of Barack Obama	West Front, U.S. Capitol	John Roberts; Chief Justice of the United States
January 20, 2017 (Friday)	Public	First inauguration of Donald Trump	West Front, U.S. Capitol	John Roberts; Chief Justice of the United States
January 20, 2021 (Wednesday)	Public	Inauguration of Joe Biden	West Front, U.S. Capitol	John Roberts; Chief Justice of the United States
January 20, 2025 (Monday) (Note: due to the cold weather in Washington, D.C.)	Public	Second inauguration of Donald Trump	Rotunda, U.S. Capitol	John Roberts; Chief Justice of the United States
Date	Type	Event	Location	Oath administered by

=== Notes ===
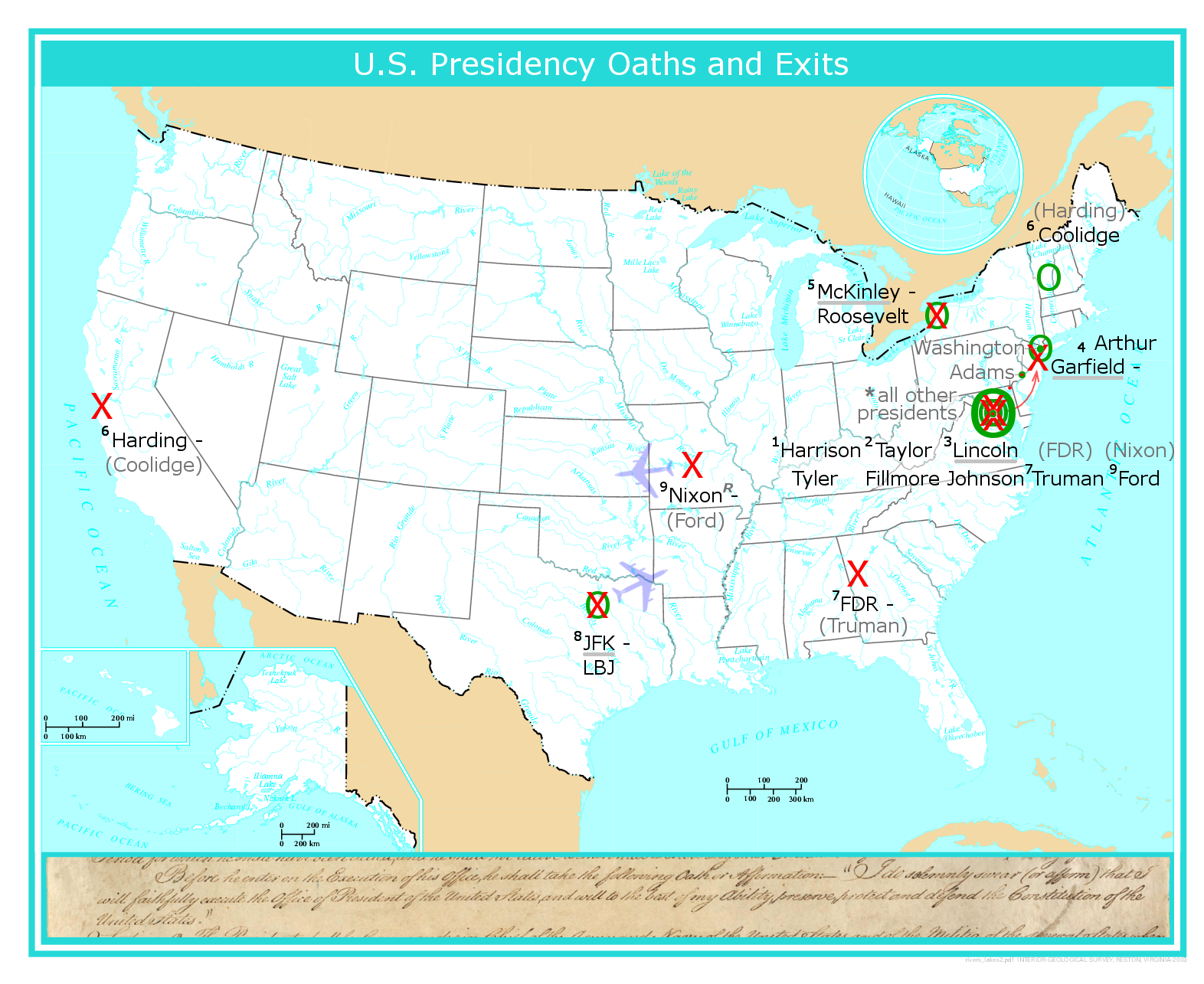
Map showing locations where the oath of office was first taken, marked with a green 'O' (or a green dot for scheduled occurrences). Locations where presidencies ended unexpectedly are marked with a red 'X' (a red dot denoted scheduled transitions). The nine sets of names shown in black denote the location where presidencies have ended intra-term due to the incumbent's death (four presidents have died of natural causes and four were assassinated—names underlined in grey) or resignation (one, noted by a superscript 'R'). The inset at the bottom of the map is Oath or Affirmation Clause (Article II, Section One, Clause 8) of the U.S. Constitution.

== See also ==
- Presidential Succession Act
- Oath of office of the vice president of the United States
- United States presidential transition
