= First inauguration of Harry S. Truman =

7th United States intra-term presidential inauguration

First presidential inauguration of Harry S. Truman
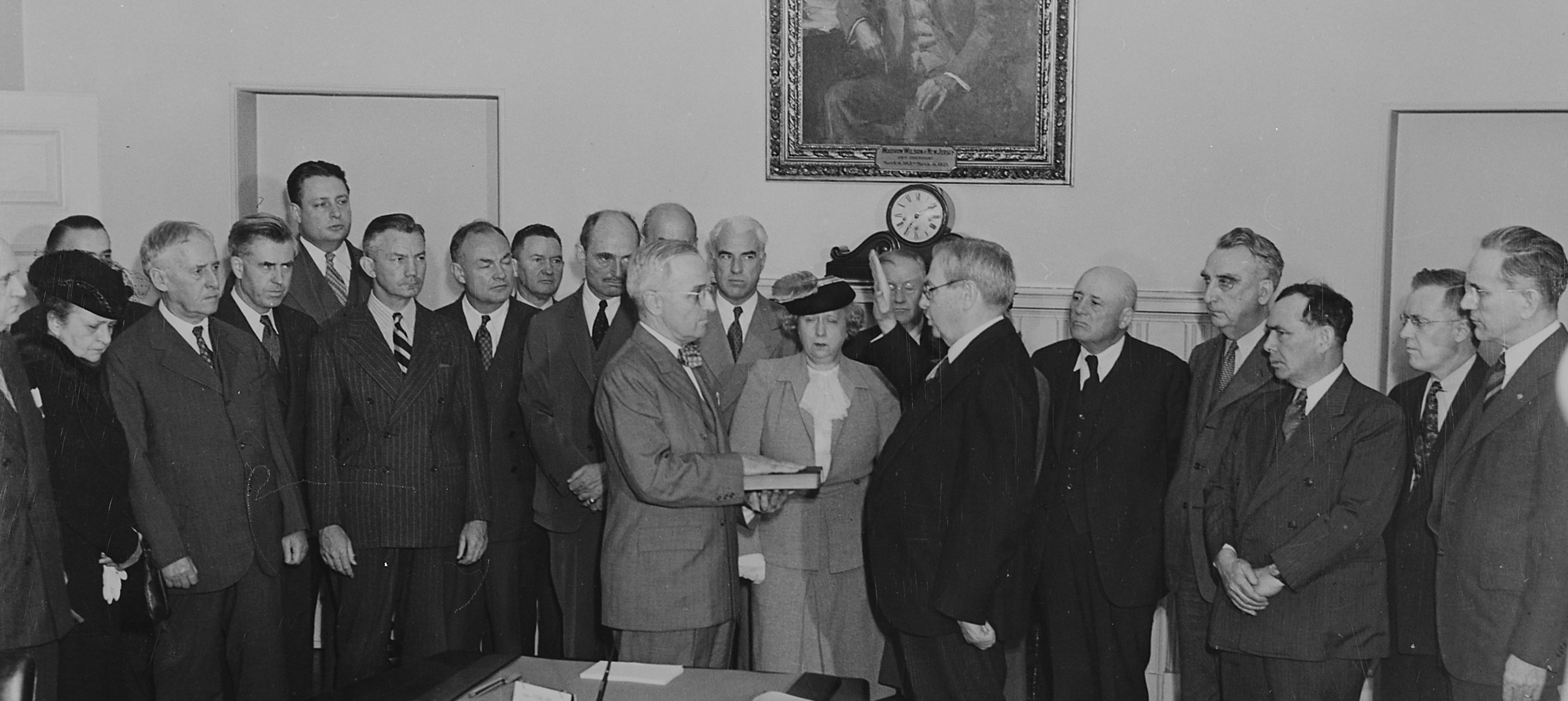
- President Truman being sworn in, following Roosevelt's death on April 12, 1945
- Date: April 12, 1945; 81 years ago
- Location: Cabinet Room, White House, Washington, D.C.
- Participants: Harry S. Truman; 33rd president of the United States — Assuming office Harlan F. Stone; Chief Justice of the United States — Administering oath

The first inauguration of Harry S. Truman as the 33rd president of the United States was held at 7:09 pm on Thursday, April 12, 1945, at the Cabinet Room inside the White House in Washington, D.C., following the death of President Franklin D. Roosevelt earlier that day. The inauguration—the seventh non-scheduled, extraordinary inauguration to ever take place—marked the commencement of the first term (a partial term of 3 years, 283 days) of Harry S. Truman as president.

Truman, then serving as vice president of the United States, had just adjourned a session of the United States Senate and was on his way to share a drink with Sam Rayburn, the speaker of the House of Representatives, when he was summoned to the White House.

Upon his arrival, he was met by Eleanor Roosevelt, who informed him that President Roosevelt was dead. Shocked, Truman asked her, "Is there anything I can do for you?", to which she replied: "Is there anything we can do for you? For you are the one in trouble now."

Chief Justice of the United States Harlan F. Stone administered the presidential oath of office; Stone began the oath "Do you, Harry Shipp Truman..." in the erroneous belief that Shipp was the president's mother's maiden name and, by extension, his middle name, to which Truman replied, "I Harry S. Truman..." before the oath was continued. At the end of the ceremony, which lasted about a minute, Truman kissed the Bible.

Among witnesses of this ceremony were Truman's wife Bess Truman, daughter Margaret Truman, Eleanor Roosevelt, Speaker Rayburn, and members of the cabinet. This was the second presidential inauguration in 1945, after the regularly scheduled inauguration for Roosevelt's fourth term on January 20.

This event has the distinction of being the first extraordinary inauguration to be photographed and recorded on video: photographs were prohibited during Theodore Roosevelt's 1901 inauguration, and Calvin Coolidge's 1923 inauguration was during night time with no press or electric lighting.

The next morning Truman told a group of reporters “There have been few men in all history the equal of the man into whose shoes I am stepping, I pray God I can measure up to the task."

== See also ==
- Presidency of Harry S. Truman
- Second inauguration of Harry S. Truman
