= Metropolitan Hotel (Washington, D.C.) =

Historic building (1850–1935)

Coordinates: 38.89324°N 77.02052°W

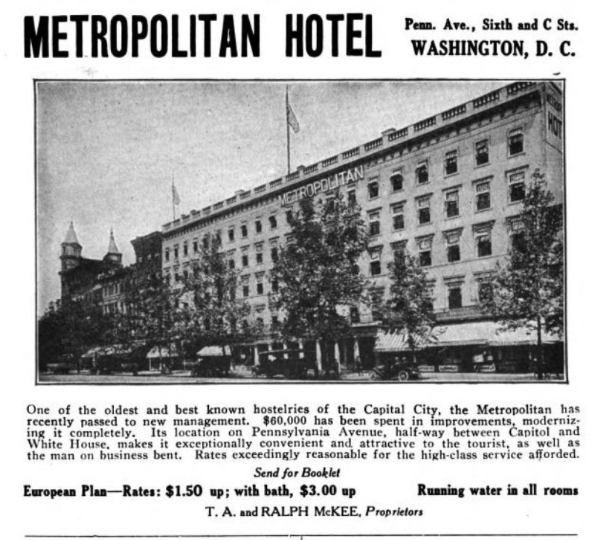
Metropolitan Hotel advertisement of 1920

The Metropolitan Hotel at Pennsylvania Avenue and Sixth Street NW in Washington, D.C. was a major hotel of the capital city of the United States from 1863 to 1933. Built in 1850 by the heirs of Jesse Brown, the Metropolitan was "brick with marble veneer, originally five stories, approx[imately] twenty bays." In its day it was home "to many distinguished congressmen and visitors." The Metropolitan had a reputation as the hotel of politicians from the Southern states.

== History ==
The history of the hotel that stood on Pennsylvania between Sixth and Seventh began with a land purchase in 1802. The first owner constructed Woodward's Centre Tavern and arranged to have water piped to the building from a nearby spring. Successive owner-operators of taverns on the block included Solomon Meyer, Robert Underwood, Nicholas L. Queen, George W. Lindsay, John Davis, and David McKeowin, all of whom built or linked extant structures in various combinations. "The Star-Spangled Banner" was supposedly sung for the first time ever at this tavern in December 1814 "during a dinner given by the citizens of the district to the Secretary of the Navy, William Jones, who was resigning his office." As Davis' Hotel it was the site of an inaugural ball for James Monroe.

Finally, in 1821, it was purchased by Jesse Brown "who had been for several years the proprietor of the City Hotel in nearby Alexandria. Brown called his Washington enterprise the Indian Queen Tavern—the name having probably been suggested from a hotel by the same name once kept by David Arrell on Market street in nearby Alexandria." The Indian Queen had a large painted wooden carving of a stylized Native American woman as well a carved wooden sign that bore the motto "good entertainment for man and beast." In the tavern era, "on a tall pole set at the footwalk were a bell and a rope. When meals were ready in the 'ordinary' a slave rang the bell and it could be heard along the avenue from Four and a Half to Ninth Street." The Indian Queen tavern on the same site as the later Metropolitan was "the traffic centre of the old stage-coach days...From the courtyard in front of the old building the Baltimore and Philadelphia coaches started each morning, and thrice a week a coach left for the old National road line to Frederick, Cumberland and Pittsburg."

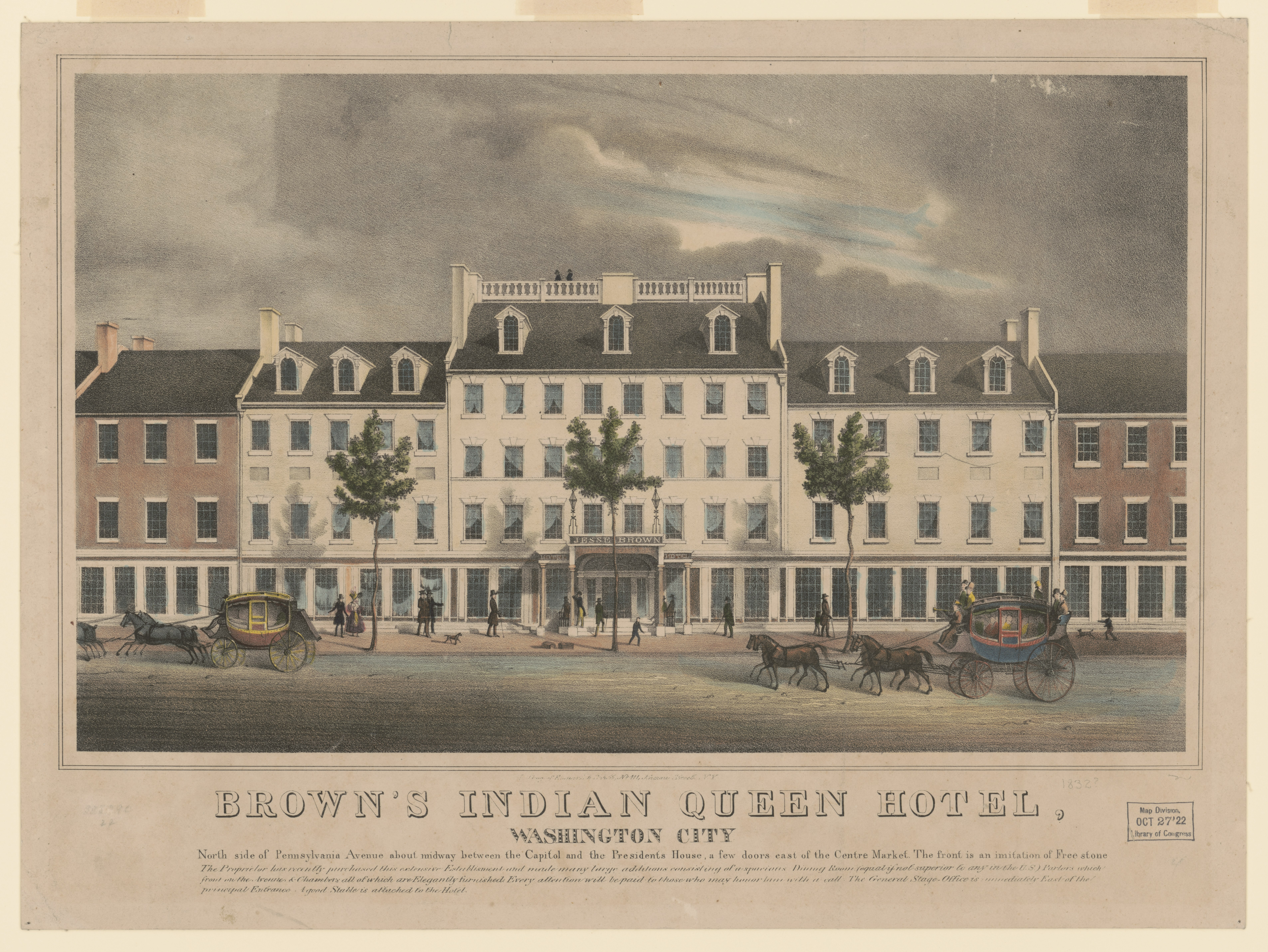
Brown's Indian Queen Hotel c. 1832

The Indian Queen Tavern was enlarged and became Brown's Indian Queen Hotel. John Tyler was sworn in as president at the Indian Queen. Charles Dickens visited on his American tour and mentioned the Indian Queen in Martin Chuzzlewitt. Benjamin Perley Poore includes an extended description of the Indian Queen in his memoirs of life in 19th-century Washington, published 1887. He recalled Jesse Brown preparing a "foaming eggnog" for patriotic holidays such as the Fourth of July and Washington's Birthday in a punch bowl that had allegedly belonged to George Washington . Pushmataha reportedly stayed at the hotel when visiting Washington for treaty negotiations, "as did many Indian delegations." As Southern belle Virginia Clay described in her memoirs, "It was the rendezvous of Southern Congressmen, and therefore was 'very agreeable and advantageous,' as my husband wrote of it ...So long ago as 1820, Thomas Hart Benton met there the representatives of the rich fur-trader, John Jacob Astor, who had been sent to the capital to induce Congressional endorsement in perfecting a great scheme that should secure to us the trade of Asia as well as the occupation of the Columbia River. Within its lobbies, many a portentous conference had taken place . Indeed, the foundations of its good reputation were laid while it was yet the Indian Queen's Tavern, renowned for its juleps and bitters. It was an unimposing structure even for Pennsylvania Avenue, then but a ragged thoroughfare, and, as I have said, notable for the great gaps between houses; but the cuisine of Brown's Hotel, as, until a few years ago, this famous house continued to be known, was excellent. In my days there, the presence of good Mrs. Brown the hostess, and her sweet daughter Rose (who married Mr. Wallach, one of Washington's rich citizens, and afterward entertained in the mansion that became famous as the residence of Mrs. Stephen A. Douglas) added much to the attractions of the old house."

Jesse Brown died in 1847, at age 74, and his sons Tillotson P. Brown and Marshall Brown took over. The old building was demolished in 1850. The cornerstone of the new Brown's Hotel was laid in May 1851, with construction projected to be completed "October next." Items deposited in the time capsule in the cornerstone included grains of gold brought by John Walker from California, a copy of the Declaration of Independence and "Rev. C. M. Butler's Thanksgiving Sermon," and "pennies by the old colored servants, put in for ' good luck,' and to 'the memory of their old master.'" The architect of the new building was John Haviland. The marble of Brown's Marble Hotel came from Maryland and/or was supposedly left over from the construction of the U.S. Capitol building. A new proprietor began leasing the building in 1862 and changed the name from Brown's Hotel to the Metropolitan Hotel. The Brown family sold out entirely in 1865. The hotel had a "broad, low ceiled lobby" that was usually "filled with broad-hatted frock-coated men" and reminded people more of "Memphis or New Orleans than of the Northern cities. The bar was always famous for its juleps, toddies, and sherry cobblers."

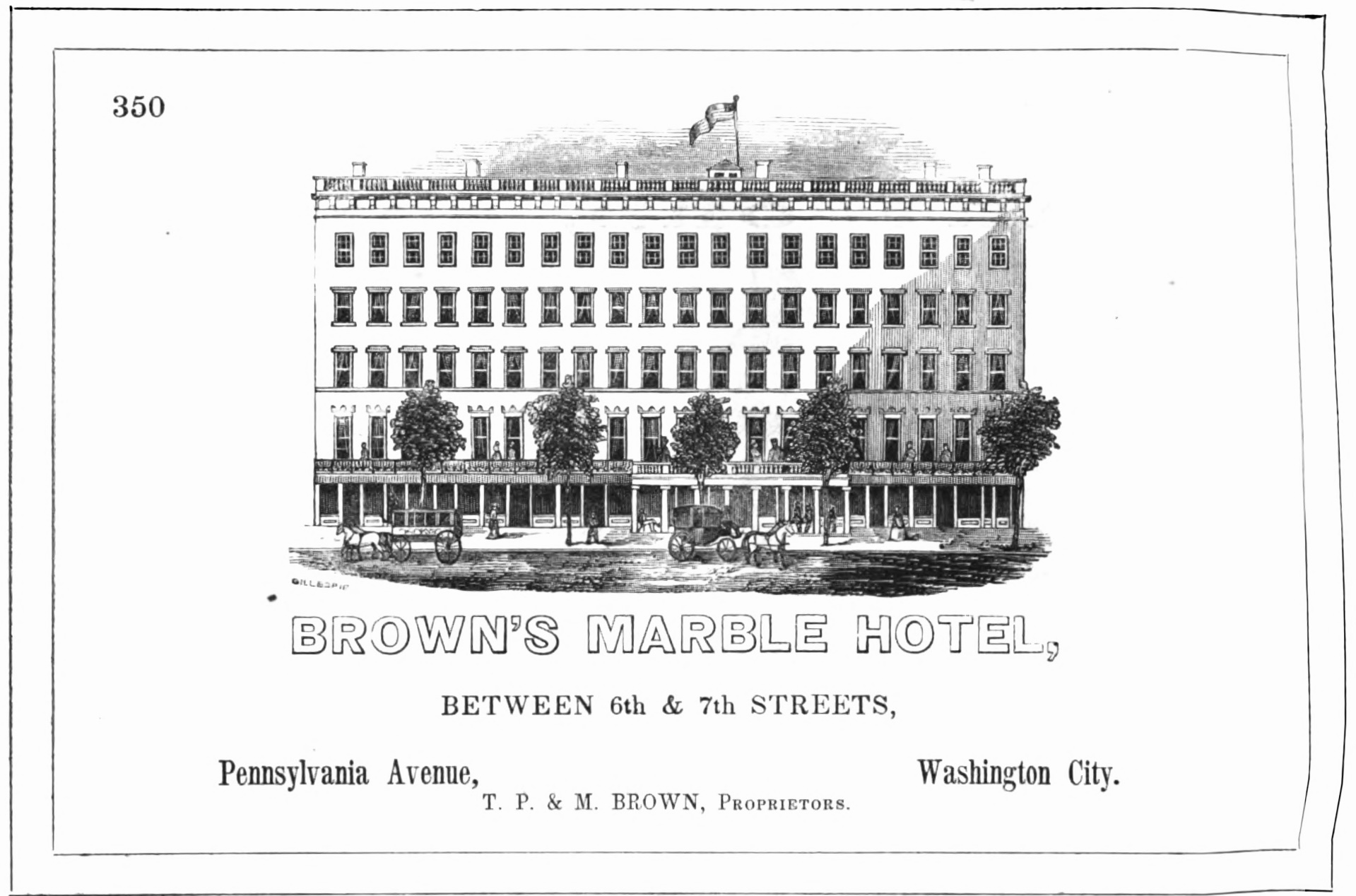
Brown's Marble Hotel advertisement, 1853

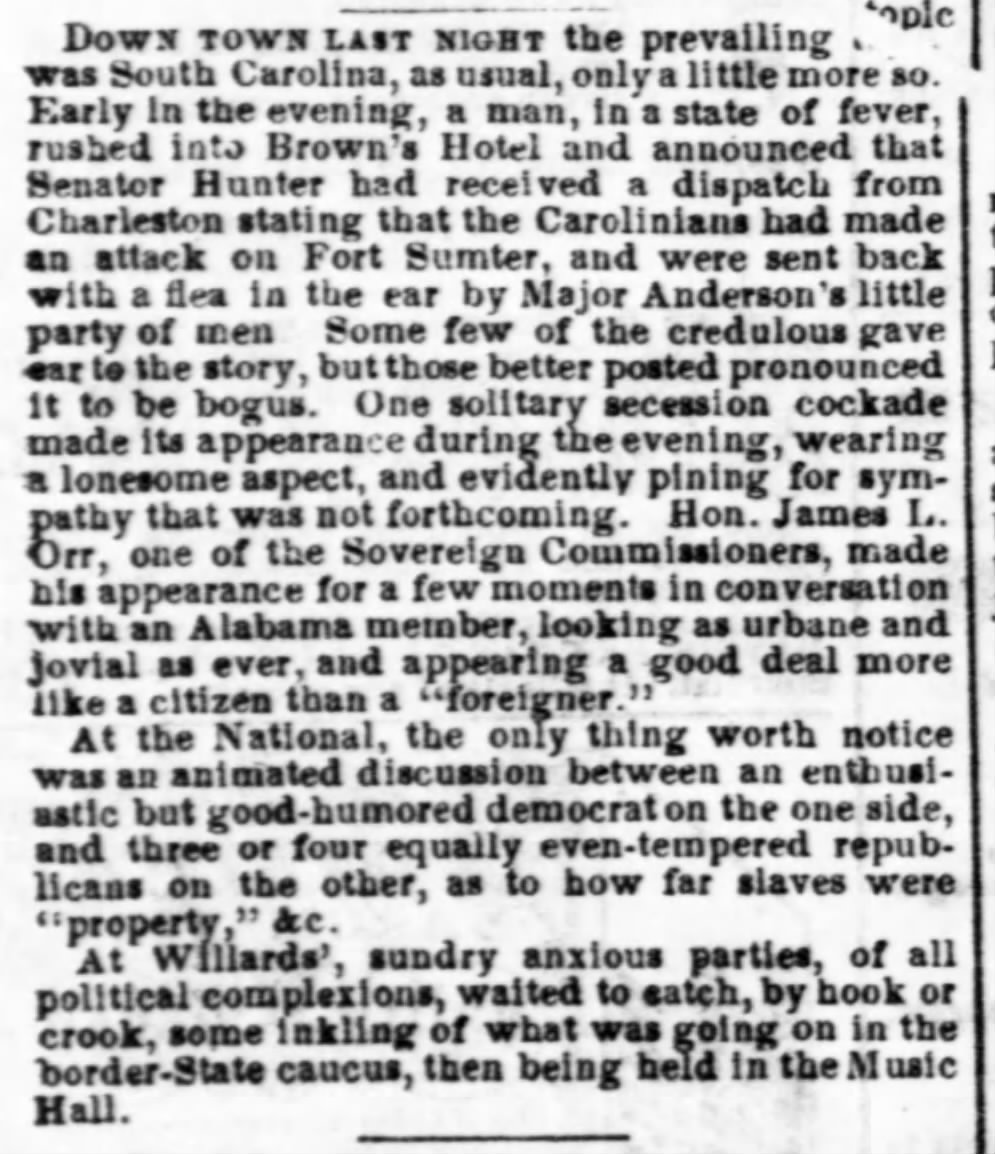
The secession crisis unfolding at the bar of Brown's Hotel, December 29, 1860

As of 1884, the old tavern building was "yet a part of the back of the hotel."

The building was razed in 1933. Some of the bricks were repurposed in the construction of a Georgian-style home on Massachusetts Avenue. The lot was then used as a bus station. As of the 1960s, the location was Barney's restaurant and "a two-story, two-bay fragment from the southwest corner now survives, first floor altered, second floor retains original Greek Revival marble trim." The remaining fragment was demolished in 1984.

== See also ==
- Kirkwood House (Washington, D.C.)
- George Washington House (Bladensburg, Maryland)
