= Third inauguration of Franklin D. Roosevelt =

39th United States presidential inauguration

Third presidential inauguration of Franklin D. Roosevelt
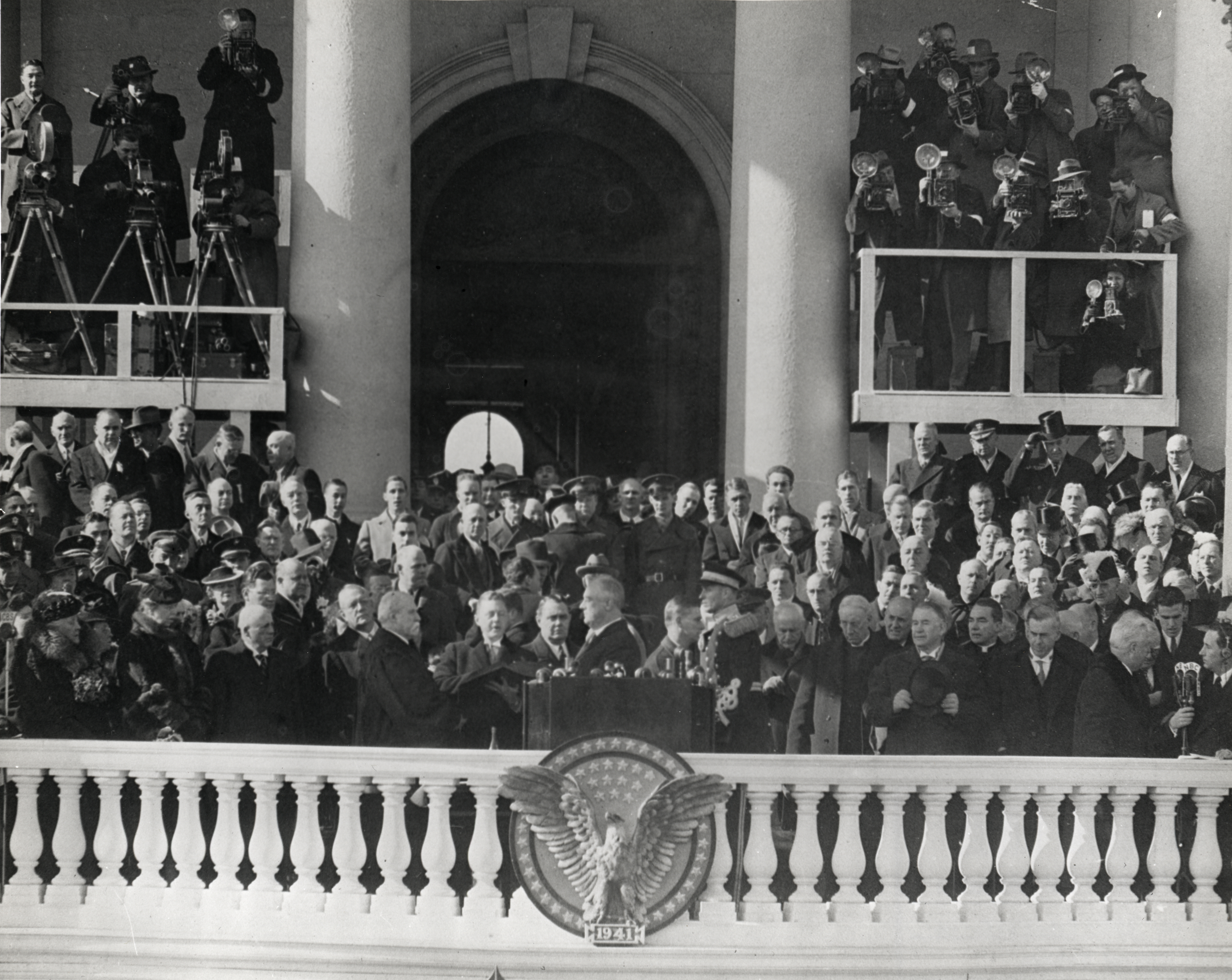
- Date: January 20, 1941; 85 years ago
- Location: United States Capitol, Washington, D.C.
- Organized by: Joint Congressional Committee on Inaugural Ceremonies
- Participants: Franklin D. Roosevelt; 32nd president of the United States — Assuming office Charles Evans Hughes; Chief Justice of the United States — Administering oath Henry A. Wallace; 33rd vice president of the United States — Assuming office John Nance Garner; 32nd vice president of the United States — Administering oath

The third inauguration of Franklin D. Roosevelt as president of the United States was held on Monday, January 20, 1941, at the East Portico of the United States Capitol in Washington, D.C. This was the 39th inauguration and marked the commencement of the third and eventually final full term of Franklin D. Roosevelt as president and the only term of Henry A. Wallace as vice president. This was the first and only time a president has been inaugurated for a third term; after the Twenty-second Amendment to the United States Constitution was ratified in 1951, no person can be elected president more than twice. Three terms are still allowed, but only when the vice president becomes president and his first term is no more than two years, that is, at most half the length of the normal four-year term: 2+4+4.

Chief Justice Charles Hughes administered the presidential oath of office to Roosevelt at 12:11 PM for the third and final time, who placed his hand upon the same family Bible used for his 1933 and 1937 inaugurations, open to 1 Corinthians 13, as he recited the oath. The outgoing vice president, John Nance Garner, administered the vice presidential oath to Wallace.

== See also ==
- Presidency of Franklin D. Roosevelt
- First inauguration of Franklin D. Roosevelt
- Second inauguration of Franklin D. Roosevelt
- Fourth inauguration of Franklin D. Roosevelt
- 1940 United States presidential election
