= Second inauguration of Franklin D. Roosevelt =

38th United States presidential inauguration

Second presidential inauguration of Franklin D. Roosevelt
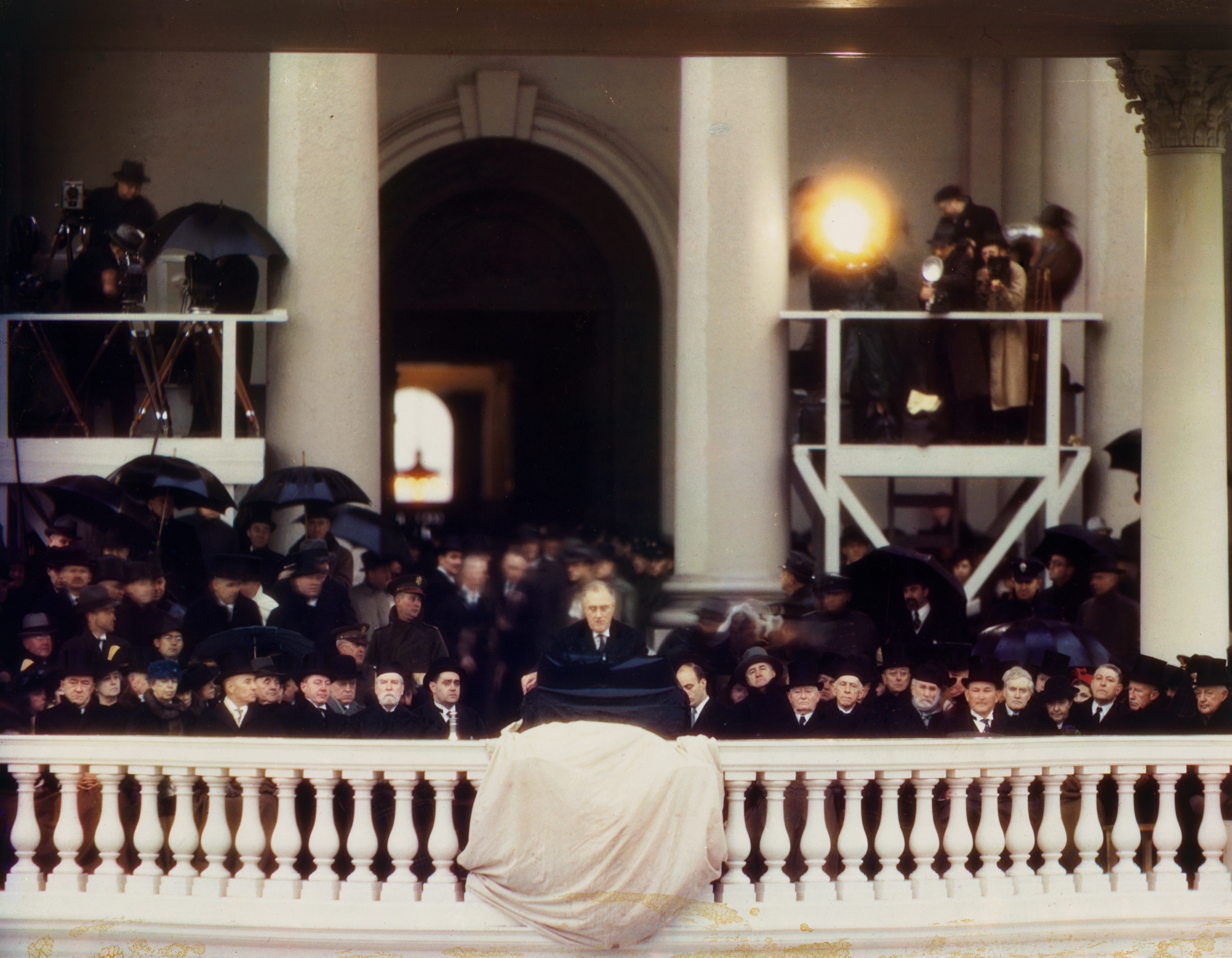
- Date: January 20, 1937; 89 years ago
- Location: United States Capitol, Washington, D.C.
- Organized by: Joint Congressional Committee on Inaugural Ceremonies
- Participants: Franklin D. Roosevelt; 32nd president of the United States — Assuming office Charles Evans Hughes; Chief Justice of the United States — Administering oath John Nance Garner; 32nd vice president of the United States — Assuming office Joseph Taylor Robinson; United States Senate Majority Leader — Administering oath

The second inauguration of Franklin D. Roosevelt as president of the United States was held on Wednesday, January 20, 1937, at the East Portico of the United States Capitol in Washington, D.C. This was the 38th presidential inauguration and marked the commencement of the second term of Franklin D. Roosevelt as president and the second and final term of John Nance Garner as vice president. It was the first inauguration to take place on January 20 per the 20th Amendment to the U.S. Constitution. This was also the first time the vice president took the oath of office on the inaugural platform rather than in the Senate Chamber. The length of Roosevelt's first term as president, and Garner's as vice president had already been shortened by 43 days.

Chief Justice Charles Hughes administered the presidential oath of office to Roosevelt at 12:29 PM. It rained all morning and during the inauguration; the crowds hastily dispersed once the inauguration was over.

Within a week of taking office, he declared a federal bank holiday.

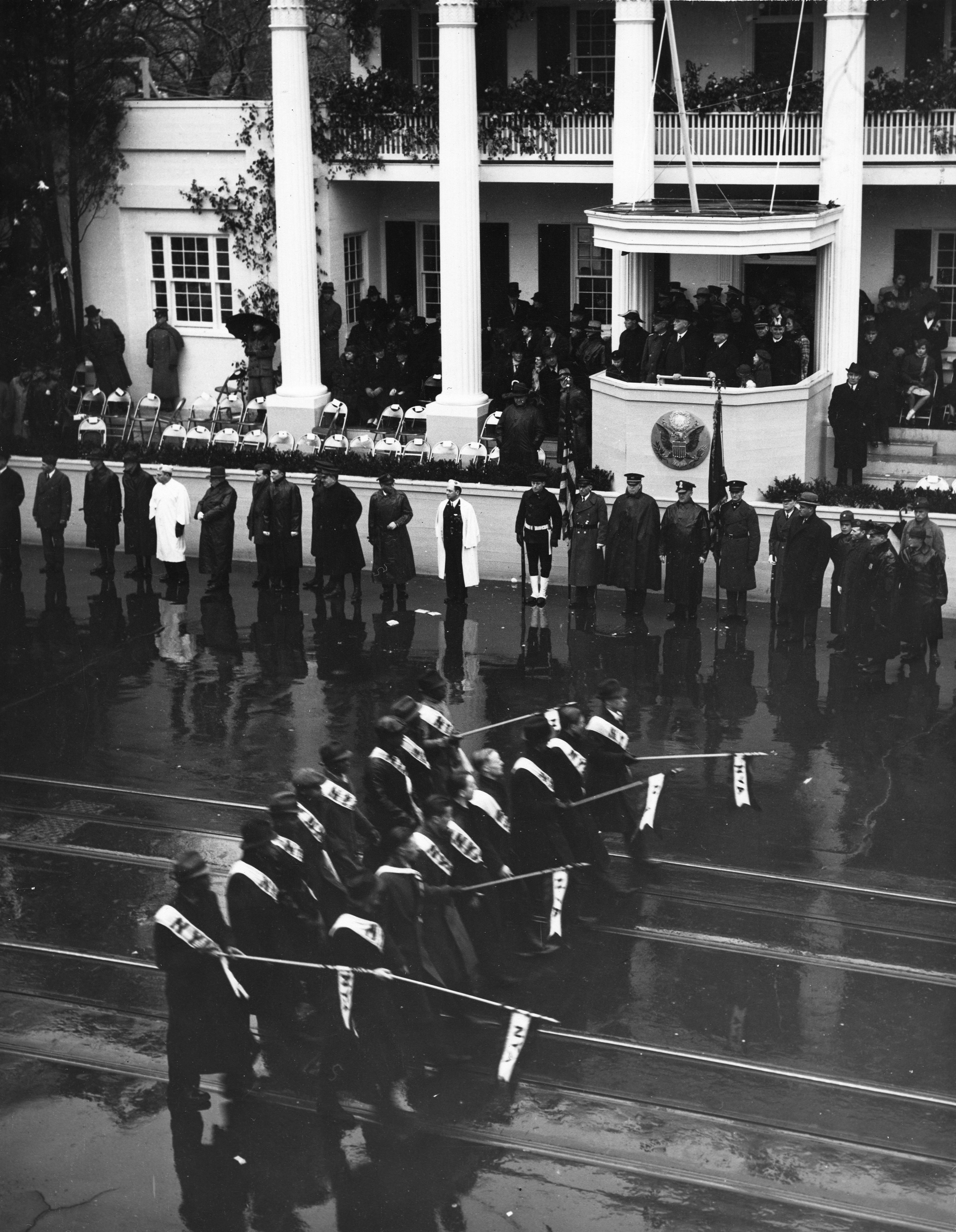
FDR-Second-Inaugural-Parade-1937

== See also ==
- Presidency of Franklin D. Roosevelt
- First inauguration of Franklin D. Roosevelt
- Third inauguration of Franklin D. Roosevelt
- Fourth inauguration of Franklin D. Roosevelt
- 1936 United States presidential election
