= Second inauguration of Lyndon B. Johnson =

45th United States presidential inauguration

Second presidential inauguration of Lyndon B. Johnson
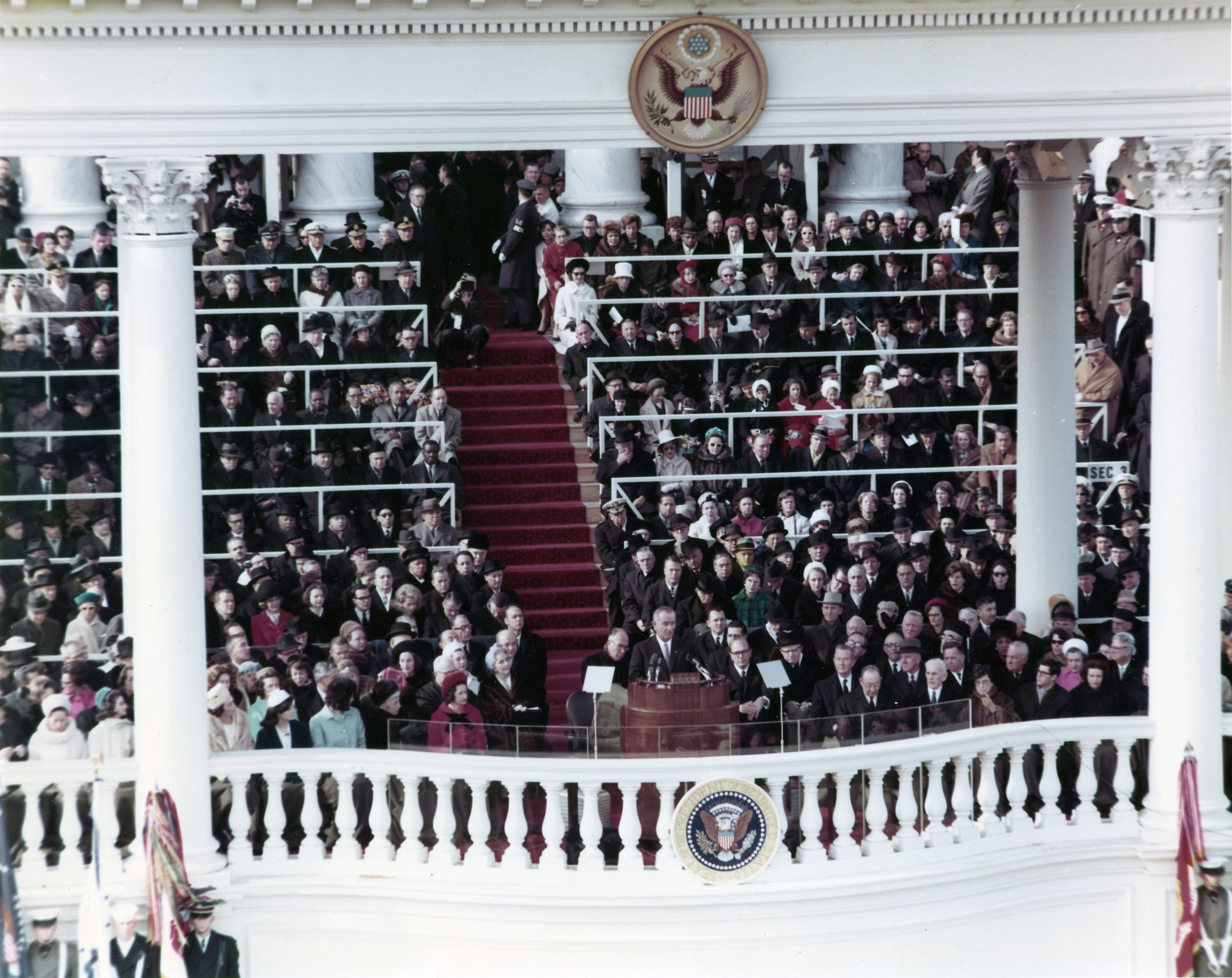
- Date: January 20, 1965; 61 years ago
- Location: United States Capitol, Washington, D.C.
- Organized by: Joint Congressional Committee on Inaugural Ceremonies
- Participants: Lyndon B. Johnson; 36th president of the United States — Assuming office Earl Warren; Chief Justice of the United States — Administering oath Hubert Humphrey; 38th vice president of the United States — Assuming office John W. McCormack; Speaker of the United States House of Representatives — Administering oath

The second inauguration of Lyndon B. Johnson as president of the United States was held on Wednesday, January 20, 1965, at the East Portico of the United States Capitol in Washington, D.C. This was the 45th inauguration and marked the second and only full term of Lyndon B. Johnson as president and the only term of Hubert Humphrey as vice president. Chief Justice Earl Warren administered the oath of office. Lady Bird Johnson founded the tradition of incoming first ladies participating in the ceremony by holding the sworn in president's Bible. Vice President Humphrey was sworn in by John W. McCormack, the speaker of the House of Representatives. This was the first inauguration when the president rode in a bulletproof limousine.

An estimated 1.2 million attended the inauguration, the third largest crowd for any event ever held at the National Mall, behind the inaugurations of Truman in 1949 and Obama in 2009. This was the last time an inauguration was covered by newsreels.

Weather conditions for 12 noon at Washington National Airport, located 3.1 miles from the ceremony, were: 37 °F (3 °C), wind 9 mph, and no precipitation.

== Inauguration gala ==
On January 18 in Washington, D.C. a pre-inauguration gala was arranged by the Democratic National Committee and The President's Club to honor the incoming President. Many stars and celebrities participated in the gala including Alfred Hitchcock, Nichols and May, Woody Allen, Ann-Margret, and singers Bobby Darin, Barbra Streisand, Carol Channing, Harry Belafonte, Julie Andrews, and Carol Burnett.

== See also ==
- Presidency of Lyndon B. Johnson
- First inauguration of Lyndon B. Johnson – The inauguration held immediately after the assassination of John F. Kennedy
- 1964 United States presidential election
