= Inauguration of John Tyler =

1st United States intra-term presidential inauguration

Presidential inauguration of John Tyler
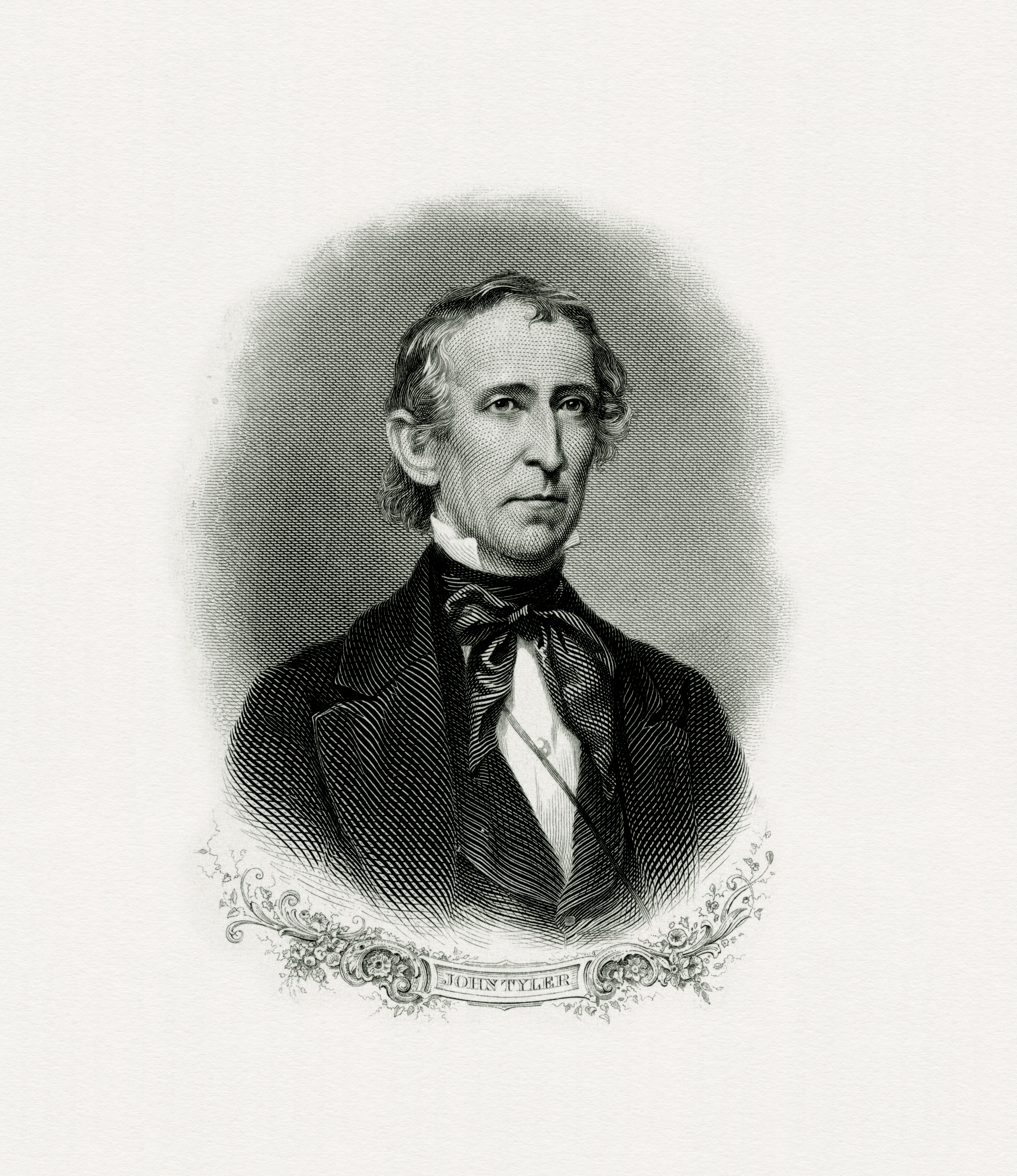
- John Tyler
- Date: April 6, 1841; 185 years ago
- Location: Brown's Indian Queen Hotel, Washington, D.C.
- Participants: John Tyler; 10th president of the United States — Assuming office William Cranch; Chief Judge of the United States Circuit Court of the District of Columbia — Administering oath

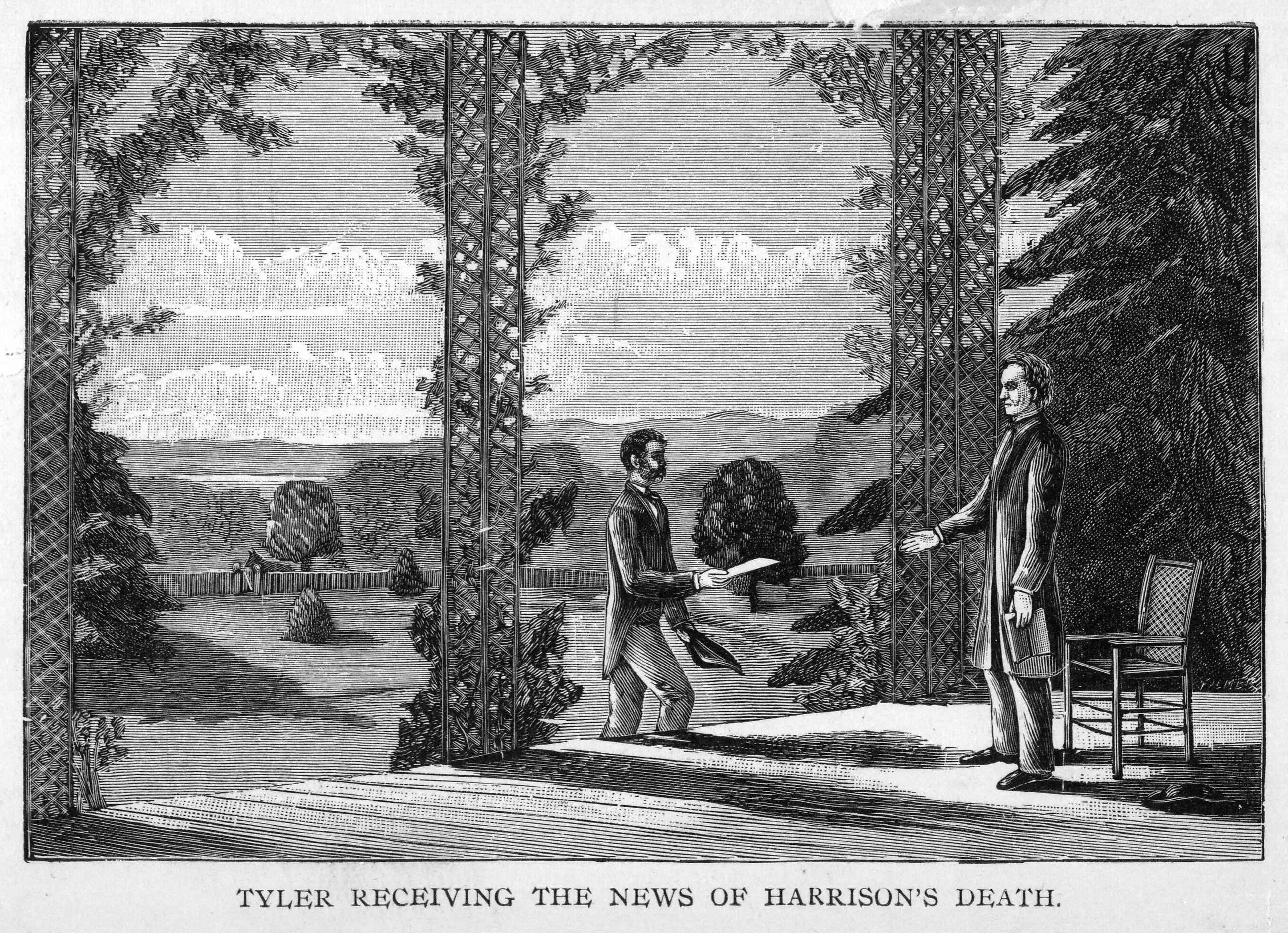
1888 illustration of President Tyler receiving the news of President Harrison's death from Fletcher Webster

The inauguration of John Tyler, the tenth president of the United States, was held on Tuesday, April 6, 1841 at the Brown's Indian Queen Hotel in Washington, D.C. following the death of President William Henry Harrison two days earlier.

The inauguration marked the commencement of John Tyler's only term (a partial term of 3 years, 334 days) as president; the first non-scheduled, extraordinary inauguration to ever take place in American history. William Cranch, the chief judge of the United States Circuit Court of the District of Columbia, administered the presidential oath of office to Tyler during the proceedings.

== Background ==
The 1840 United States presidential election was won by the Whig Party nominee, Harrison, with Tyler as his vice-presidential running mate. Harrison was inaugurated as the ninth president on March 4, 1841, but on March 26, 1841, he came down with a cold, with pneumonia and pleurisy then setting in. It was believed that Harrison's illness was directly caused by the bad weather at his inauguration on March 4; however, the illness did not arise until more than three weeks after the event.

On April 1, Secretary of State Daniel Webster sent word of Harrison's illness to Vice President Tyler, who was at his home in Williamsburg, Virginia. Two days later, Richmond attorney James Lyons wrote with the news that the president had taken a turn for the worse, remarking that "I shall not be surprised to hear by tomorrow's mail that Gen'l Harrison is no more." Tyler determined not to travel to Washington, not wanting to appear unseemly in anticipating the president's death. At dawn on April 5, Webster's son Fletcher, Chief Clerk of the State Department, arrived at Tyler's plantation with a letter from Webster, informing the new president of Harrison's death the morning before.

== April 4–6, 1841 ==
President Tyler immediately packed a bag and headed towards Washington with one of his sons via the fastest conveyances then available (steamboat and train), arriving early in the morning of April 6, having made the 230-mile (370 km) journey in 21 hours. He was greeted by a bipartisan group of dignitaries, including the entire Cabinet. A heated discussion followed as to what procedural steps should be taken in the aftermath of Harrison's death. While several sitting presidents had experienced illness, none had previously died while in office. Some cabinet members held that no formal actions needed to be taken, as Tyler's right to take over as acting president was virtually undisputed. During Harrison's illness, the executive branch was ruled by majority vote of cabinet officials. Tyler discontinued this practice, contending that taking the oath of office would ensure his authority as the tenth president of the United States.

== Taking oath of office ==
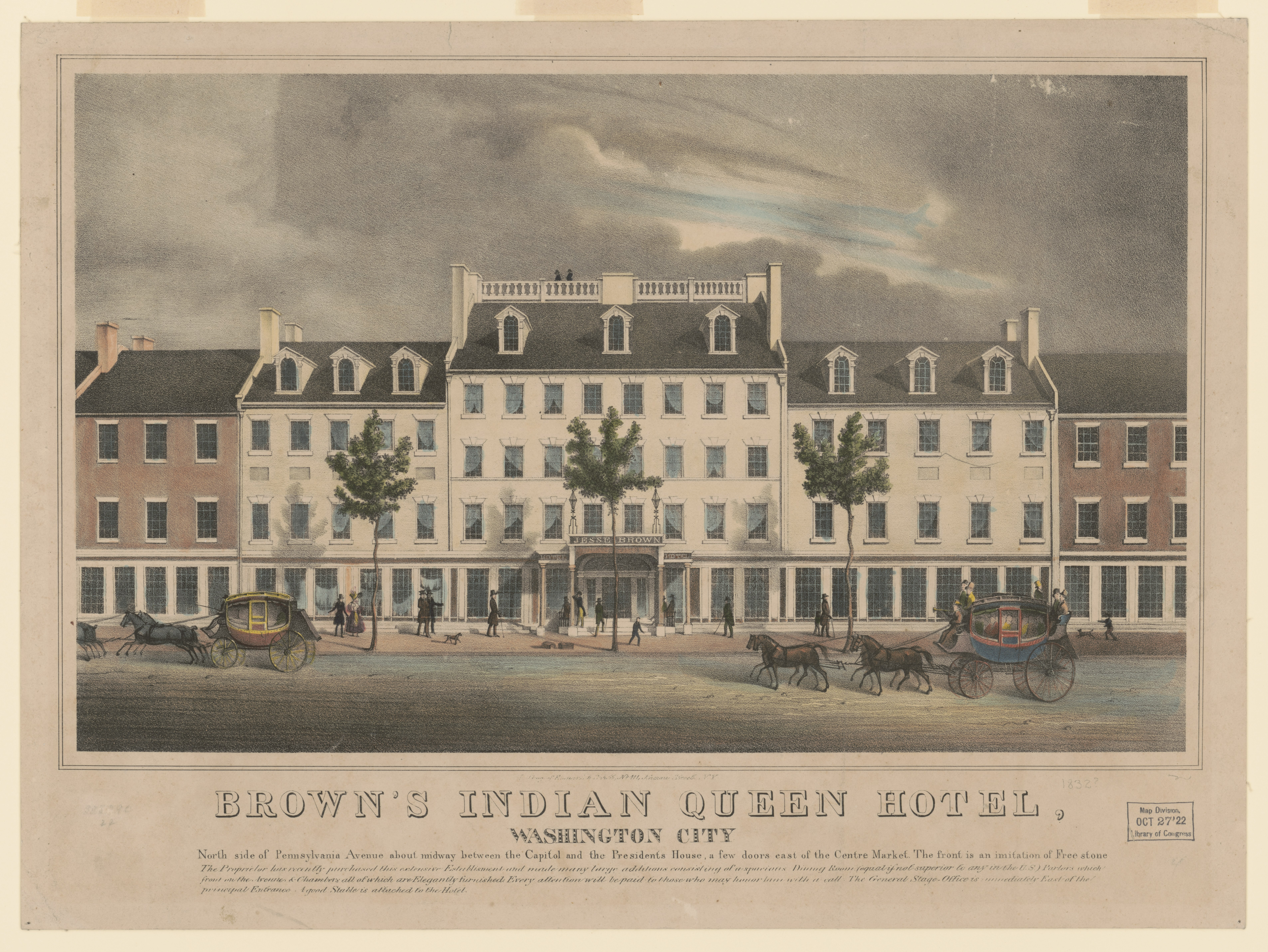
Brown's Indian Queen Hotel c. 1832

On April 6, 1841, William Cranch, Chief Judge of the United States Circuit Court of the District of Columbia, administered the oath to President Tyler in the lobby of the Brown's Indian Queen Hotel, making this the first extraordinary presidential inauguration in history.

On April 9, Tyler published an inaugural message to a special session of Congress that Harrison had called. Later presidents would do the same under similar circumstances.

== Establishing precedent ==
Tyler's defense of his title was unyielding. Letters addressed to the “vice president” or “acting president” were returned unopened. The “Tyler precedent” subsequently endured through the next seven presidential deaths, four after assassinations, until it was codified in 1967 when the Twenty-fifth Amendment to the United States Constitution was ratified.
