= Inauguration of Herbert Hoover =

36th United States presidential inauguration

Presidential inauguration of Herbert Hoover
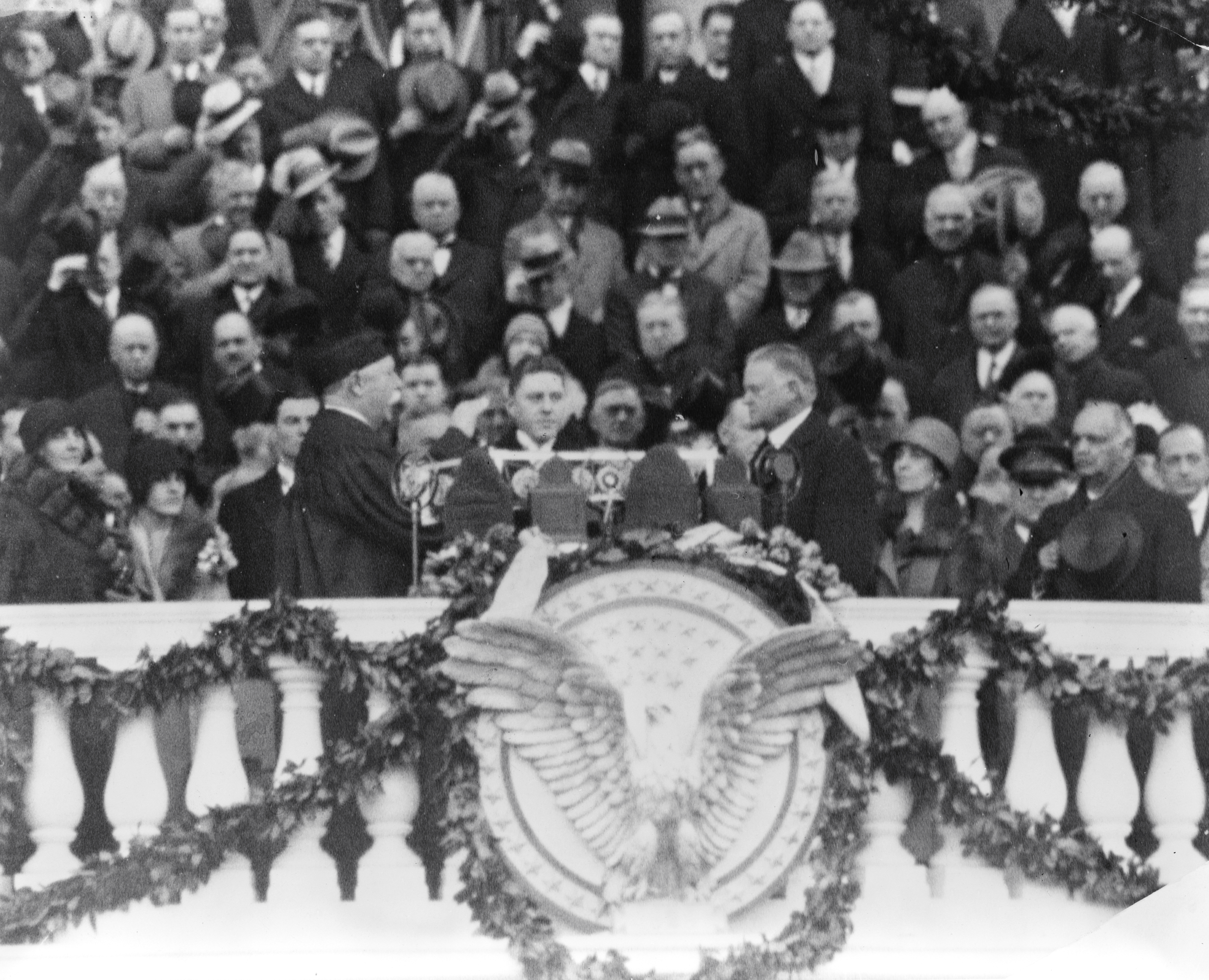
- Date: March 4, 1929; 97 years ago
- Location: United States Capitol, Washington, D.C.
- Organized by: Joint Congressional Committee on Inaugural Ceremonies
- Participants: Herbert Hoover; 31st president of the United States — Assuming office William Howard Taft; Chief Justice of the United States — Administering oath Charles Curtis; 31st vice president of the United States — Assuming office Charles G. Dawes; 30th vice president of the United States — Administering oath

The inauguration of Herbert Hoover as the 31st president of the United States was held on Monday, March 4, 1929, at the East Portico of the United States Capitol in Washington, D.C. This was the 36th inauguration and marked the commencement of the only term of both Herbert Hoover as president and Charles Curtis as vice president. Chief Justice and former President William Howard Taft administered the presidential oath of office to Hoover. This was the first presidential inauguration to be recorded by sound newsreels. Following the second inauguration of Calvin Coolidge, overseen by Taft exactly four years earlier, it was also the second (and most recent) time that a former president administered the oath of office to a new president.

The Constitution of the United States gives the president the option either to swear or to affirm the oath. Hoover is often listed as having said "affirm" due to being a Quaker, but the newsreel taken of the ceremony indicates that he said "solemnly swear." Franklin Pierce was the only president known to say "affirm" rather than "swear" when taking the oath of office.

In administering the oath, Taft incorrectly recited the phrase "preserve, protect and defend" as "preserve, maintain and defend". Helen Terwilliger, a 13-year-old eighth-grade student in Walden, New York, caught the error and wrote to the Chief Justice to tell him. Taft conceded that he had made an error, attributing it to "the defect of an old man's memory", but asserted that he had made a different error, misquoting the words as "preserve, maintain and protect". Terwilliger did not back down from her claim; Fox Film, Pathé News, and Paramount News, the companies that had prepared newsreels of the inauguration, examined their recordings and jointly confirmed Terwilliger's account.

== Gallery ==
Coolidge and Hoover, inauguration day

Hoover Inauguration, 1929

== See also ==
- Presidency of Herbert Hoover
- 1928 United States presidential election
