= First inauguration of Dwight D. Eisenhower =

42nd United States presidential inauguration

First presidential inauguration of Dwight D. Eisenhower
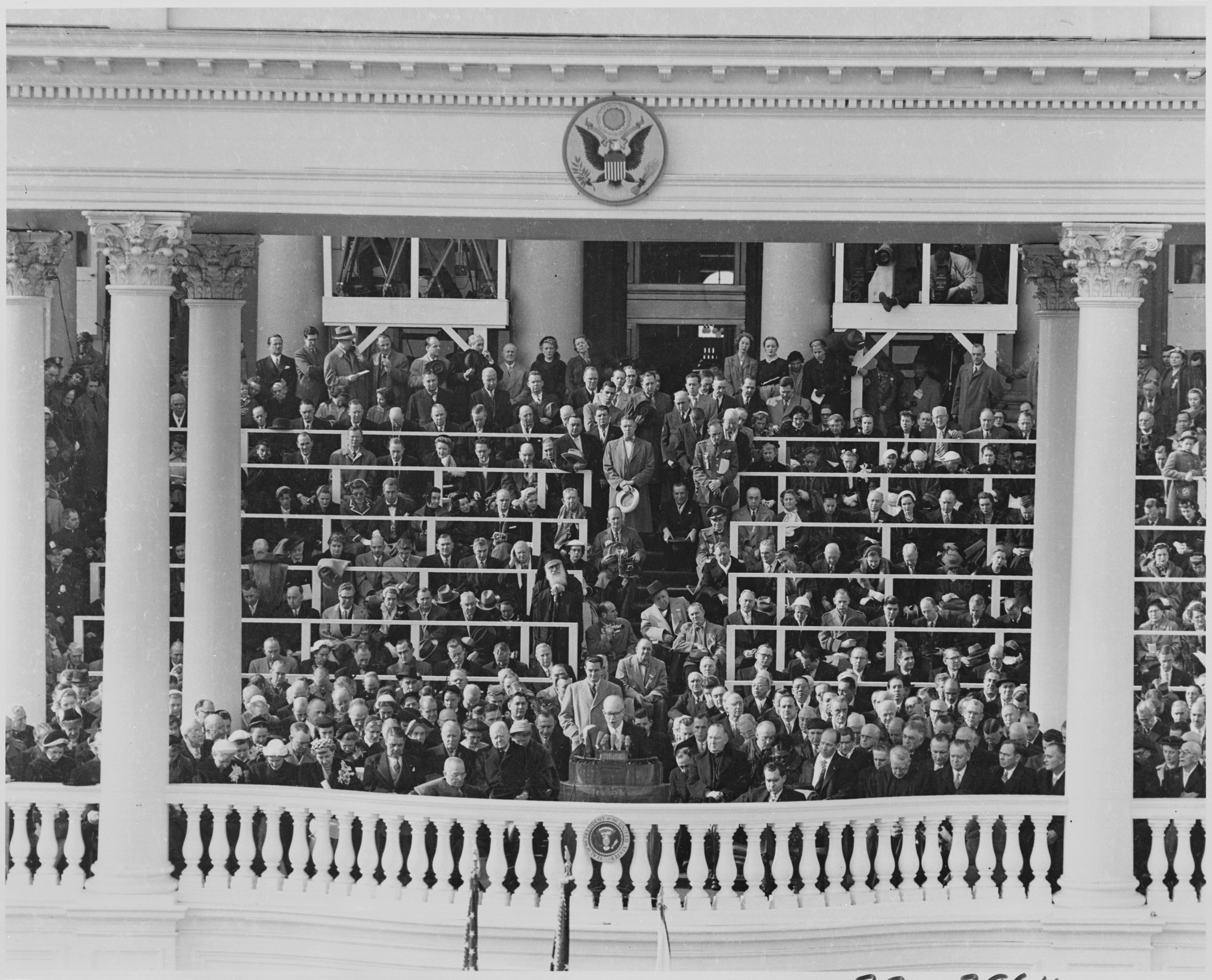
- Eisenhower delivers his first inaugural address on the east portico of the U.S. Capitol, January 20, 1953
- Date: January 20, 1953; 73 years ago
- Location: United States Capitol, Washington, D.C.
- Organized by: Joint Congressional Committee on Inaugural Ceremonies
- Participants: Dwight D. Eisenhower; 34th president of the United States — Assuming office Fred M. Vinson; Chief Justice of the United States — Administering oath Richard Nixon; 36th vice president of the United States — Assuming office William Knowland; United States Senator — Administering oath

The first inauguration of Dwight D. Eisenhower as the 34th president of the United States was held on Tuesday, January 20, 1953, at the East Portico of the United States Capitol in Washington, D.C. This was the 42nd inauguration and marked the commencement of the first term of Dwight D. Eisenhower as president and of Richard Nixon as vice president. Chief Justice Fred M. Vinson administered the presidential oath of office to Eisenhower. During the oath, Eisenhower said the line "the office of President of the United States" as "the office of the President of the United States," even as chief justice Vinson said the line correctly. The vice presidential oath was administered to Nixon by Senator William Knowland.

Eisenhower placed his hand on two Bibles when he recited the oath: the Bible used by George Washington in 1789, opened to II Chronicles 7:14; and his own personal "West Point Bible," opened to Psalm 33:12. Afterward, he recited his own prayer at the start of his inaugural address, rather than kissing the Bible.

== Inaugural address ==
The inaugural address was a recap of many different themes, including the reflection that the halfway point in the century was now passed and it had resulted in unprecedented changes in world governments.

He said: A people that values its privileges above its principles, soon loses both

George H. W. Bush would also compose his own prayer to recite during his inaugural speech in 1989. After the oath, rodeo trick rider Montie Montana, lassoed Eisenhower, in a display attributed to America's peak fascination with Western films.

Weather conditions for 12 noon at Washington National Airport, located 3.1 miles from the ceremony, were: 49 °F (9 °C), wind 5 mph, and no precipitation.

Dwight D. Eisenhower's first Inaugural Address

== Inaugural committee ==
The 1953 United States Congress Joint Committee on Inaugural Ceremonies, the group responsible for the planning and execution of the Inauguration, was composed of:

- Senator Styles Bridges (R-NH), Chairman
- Senator Carl T. Hayden (D-AZ)
- Representative Leslie C. Arends (R-IL)
- Representative Joseph W. Martin (R-MA)
- Representative Sam Rayburn (D-TX)

== See also ==
- 1952 United States presidential election
- Presidency of Dwight D. Eisenhower
- Second inauguration of Dwight D. Eisenhower
