= Second inauguration of Harry S. Truman =

41st United States presidential inauguration

Second presidential inauguration of Harry S. Truman
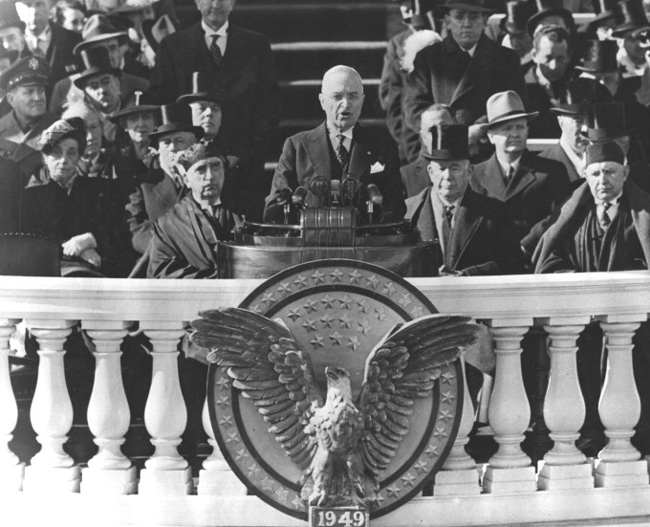
- Harry Truman delivers his inaugural address after being sworn in for his second term in office.
- Date: January 20, 1949; 77 years ago
- Location: United States Capitol, Washington, D.C.
- Organized by: Joint Congressional Committee on Inaugural Ceremonies
- Participants: Harry S. Truman; 33rd president of the United States — Assuming office Fred M. Vinson; Chief Justice of the United States — Administering oath Alben W. Barkley; 35th vice president of the United States — Assuming office Stanley Forman Reed; Associate Justice of the Supreme Court of the United States — Administering oath

The second inauguration of Harry S. Truman as president of the United States was held on Thursday, January 20, 1949, at the East Portico of the United States Capitol in Washington, D.C. This was the 41st inauguration and marked the commencement of the second and only full term of Harry S. Truman as president as well as the only term of Alben W. Barkley as vice president. Chief Justice Fred M. Vinson administered the presidential oath of office while Justice Stanley Forman Reed administered the vice-presidential oath of office.

It was the first televised U.S. presidential inauguration and the first with an air parade. Truman also restarted the tradition of an official inaugural ball, which had disappeared since the inauguration of William Howard Taft in 1909.

== Celebration ==
External videos
- Television footage from the Truman Library
- The Inauguration of Our 33rd President – Harry S. Truman

The inaugural celebration, organized by Melvin D. Hildreth, lasted the full week from January 16–23. The New York Times described it as "the most splendiferous since Franklin D. Roosevelt tried to lift the pall of gloom of 1933 with brave words proclaiming the New Deal". Some confusion was generated when thousands of people received souvenir "invitations" that were in fact not valid tickets to inaugural events.

1.3 million people reportedly stood on Constitution and Pennsylvania Avenues in Washington, D.C., to watch the inaugural parade. Six hundred warplanes flew overhead, and army soldiers marched with new weaponry on display. Some of the marching units were racially mixed. During the parade, Truman was saluted by retired general and future president Dwight D. Eisenhower, then the president of Columbia University. Truman drew media attention for 'snubbing' southern Governors Strom Thurmond and Herman Talmadge during the parade.

Lena Horne, Dorothy Maynor and Lionel Hampton performed at the inaugural gala—the first African Americans to appear at this type of performance.

== Ceremony ==
The inaugural ceremony took place on January 20, 1949. Truman took the oath of office administered by Chief Justice of the United States Fred Vinson. Truman then delivered an address and departed with the parade.

According to one analysis, the delayed arrival of members of Congress created a break in succession of Truman's terms as president: the Twentieth Amendment to the United States Constitution, ratified in 1933, states that a president's term ends at noon on January 20 after the election.

As some members of Congress arrived 10 minutes late, and took another 10 minutes to take their seats, Vice President Alben W. Barkley was inaugurated at 12:23, technically serving as president for six minutes until Truman was inaugurated at 12:29.

In the inaugural address, sometimes called the Four Point speech, Truman discussed economic growth and opposition to Communism across the globe. This moment is often identified as the beginning of development policy in relation to Third World.

Millions of people watched the inauguration, broadcast as a single live program that aired on every network. (Millions more listened on radio). Many schoolchildren watched from their classrooms. Truman authorized a holiday for federal employees so that they could also watch. The ceremony, and Truman's speech, were also broadcast abroad through the Voice of America, and translated into other languages including Russian and German. According to some calculations, the 1949 inauguration had more witnesses than all previous presidential inaugurations combined.

Weather conditions for 12 noon at Washington National Airport, located 3.1 miles from the ceremony, were: 39 °F (4 °C), wind 16 mph, and no precipitation.

== Demonstrations ==
Despite being widely attacked as communists, thousands of members of the Civil Rights Congress arrived in Washington, D.C., to protest the inauguration. The group protested Smith Act trials of communist leaders, as well as unfair death penalty sentences for African Americans. They also called for a permanent Fair Employment Practices Commission and the abolition of the House Un-American Activities Committee.

== See also ==
- Presidency of Harry S. Truman
- First inauguration of Harry S. Truman
- 1948 United States presidential election
