= Second inauguration of Dwight D. Eisenhower =

43rd United States presidential inauguration

Second presidential inauguration of Dwight D. Eisenhower
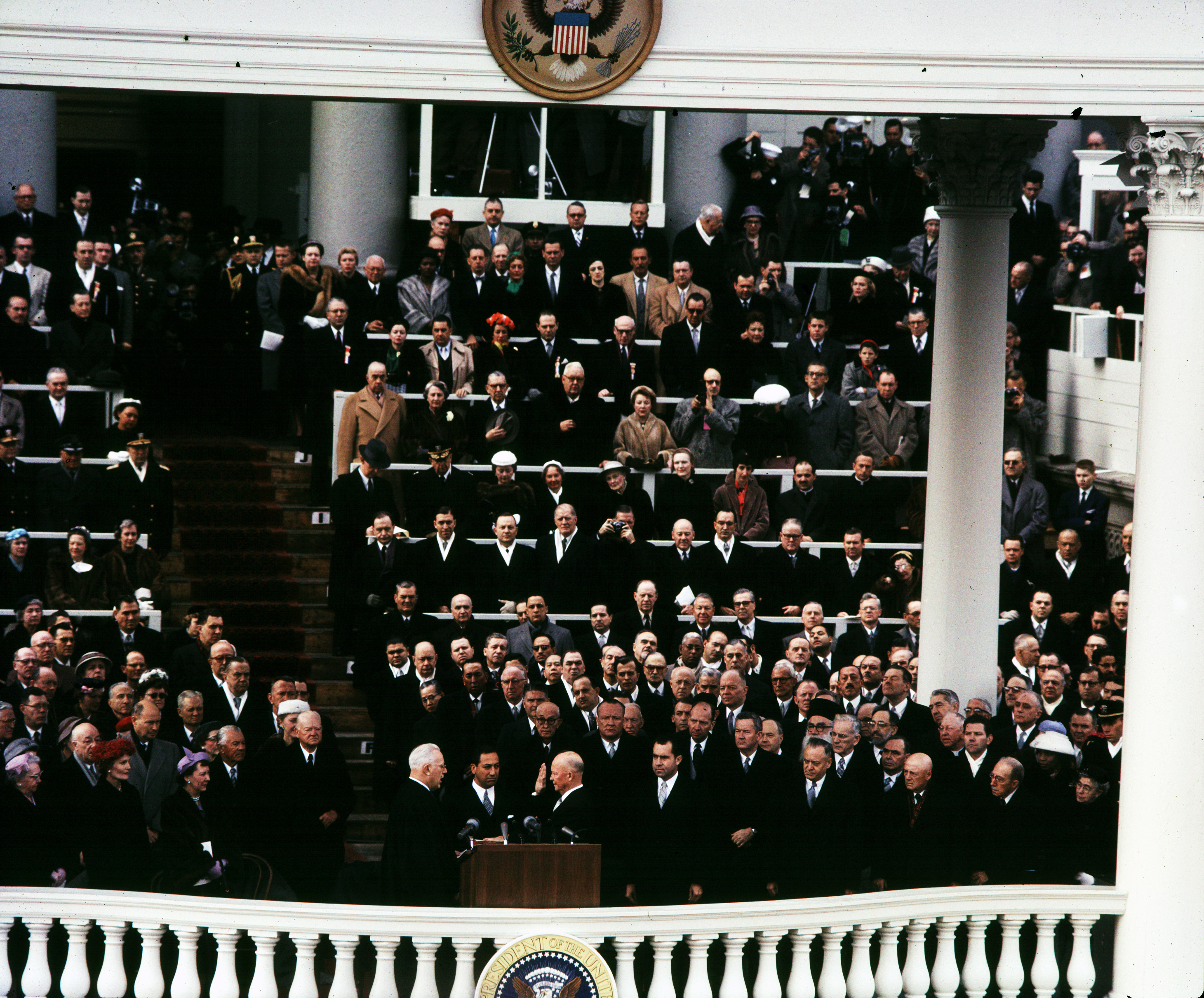
- Date: January 20, 1957; 69 years ago (private); January 21, 1957 (public)
- Location: White House (private) United States Capitol, Washington, D.C. (public)
- Organized by: Joint Congressional Committee on Inaugural Ceremonies
- Participants: Dwight D. Eisenhower; 34th president of the United States — Assuming office Earl Warren; Chief Justice of the United States — Administering oath Richard Nixon; 36th vice president of the United States — Assuming office William Knowland; United States Senate minority leader — Administering oath

The second inauguration of Dwight D. Eisenhower as president of the United States was held privately on Sunday, January 20, 1957, at the White House and publicly on the following day, Monday, January 21, 1957, at the East Portico of the United States Capitol; both located in Washington, D.C. This was the 43rd inauguration and marked the commencement of the second and final four-year term of both Dwight D. Eisenhower as president and Richard Nixon as vice president. Chief Justice Earl Warren administered the presidential oath of office after the Senate Minority Leader William Knowland swore in the vice president.

During the oath, as at his first inaugural, Eisenhower said the line "the office of President of the United States" as "the office of the President of the United States," even as Chief Justice Warren said the line correctly.

Opera singer Marian Anderson was the first African-American woman to perform at a presidential inauguration when she sang the National Anthem at this inauguration.

Weather conditions for 12 noon at Washington National Airport, located 3.1 miles from the ceremony, were: 39 °F (4 °C), wind 10 mph, and no precipitation.

== See also ==
- Presidency of Dwight D. Eisenhower
- First inauguration of Dwight D. Eisenhower
- 1956 United States presidential election
