= Fourth inauguration of Franklin D. Roosevelt =

40th United States presidential inauguration

Fourth presidential inauguration of Franklin D. Roosevelt
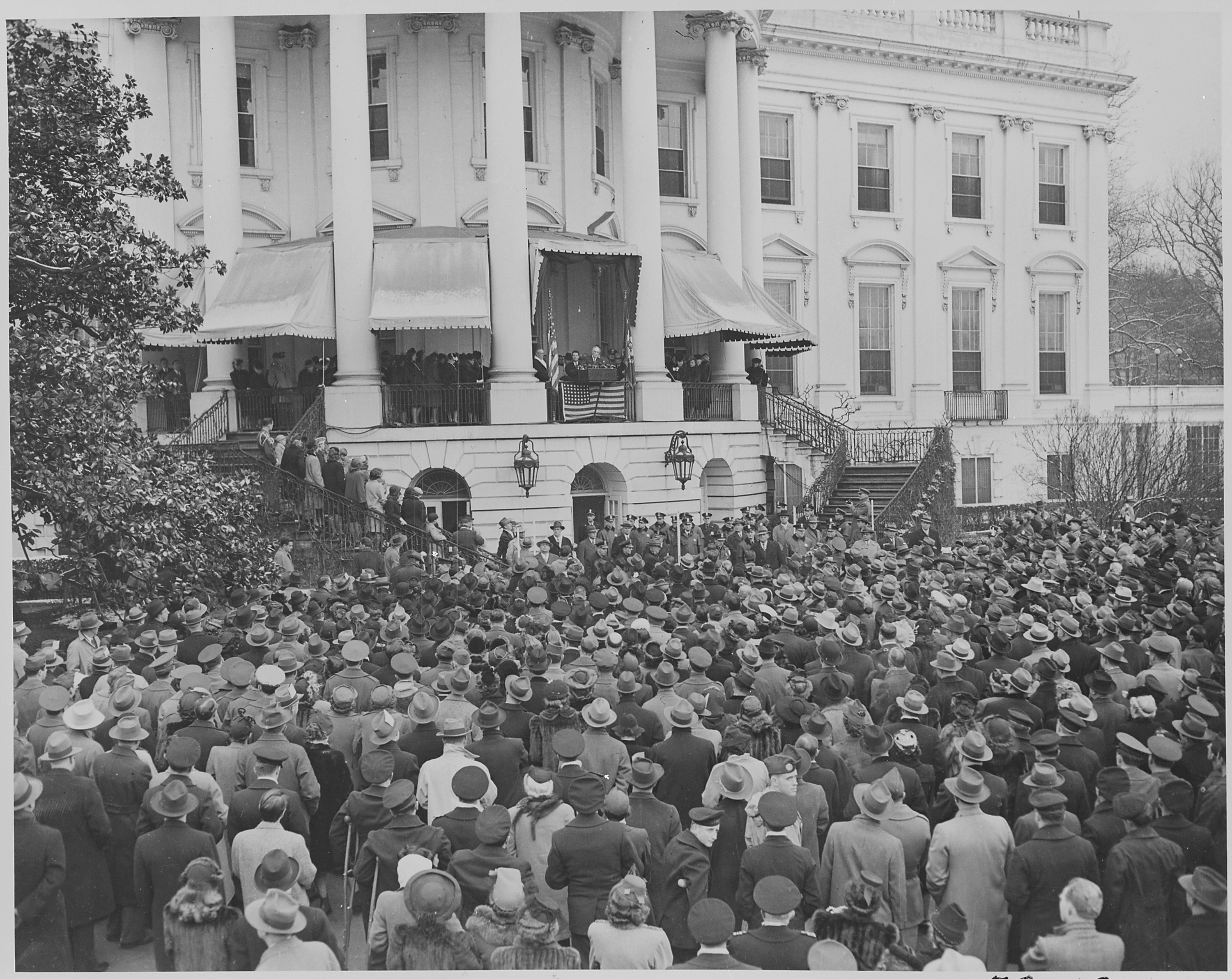
- Date: January 20, 1945; 81 years ago
- Location: White House, Washington, D.C.
- Organized by: Joint Congressional Committee on Inaugural Ceremonies
- Participants: Franklin D. Roosevelt; 32nd president of the United States — Assuming office Harlan F. Stone; Chief Justice of the United States — Administering oath Harry S. Truman; 34th vice president of the United States — Assuming office Henry A. Wallace; 33rd vice president of the United States — Administering oath

The fourth inauguration of Franklin D. Roosevelt as president of the United States was held on Saturday, January 20, 1945. This was the 40th inauguration and marked the commencement of the fourth and final term of Roosevelt as president and the only term of Harry S. Truman as vice president. This is the only time a president was inaugurated for a fourth term; after the Twenty-second Amendment to the United States Constitution was ratified in 1951, no person can be elected president more than twice. Roosevelt died 82 days into this term, and Truman succeeded to the presidency.

Due to austerity measures in effect during World War II, the inauguration was held on the South Portico of the White House, rather than the Capitol. The parade and other festivities were canceled as well. The oath was administered by Chief Justice Harlan F. Stone at 12:03 PM and the subsequent address was one of the shortest on record. This was also the most recent inauguration in which an outgoing vice president swore in his successor, which had previously been the practice. Roosevelt's presidency was, and remains, the longest in American history.

Weather conditions for 12 noon at Washington National Airport, located 3.1 miles (5 km) from the ceremony, were: 36 °F (2 °C), wind 12 mph (19 km/h), and no precipitation.

== See also ==
- Presidency of Franklin D. Roosevelt
- First inauguration of Franklin D. Roosevelt
- Second inauguration of Franklin D. Roosevelt
- Third inauguration of Franklin D. Roosevelt
- 1944 United States presidential election
