= Timeline of the John Tyler presidency =

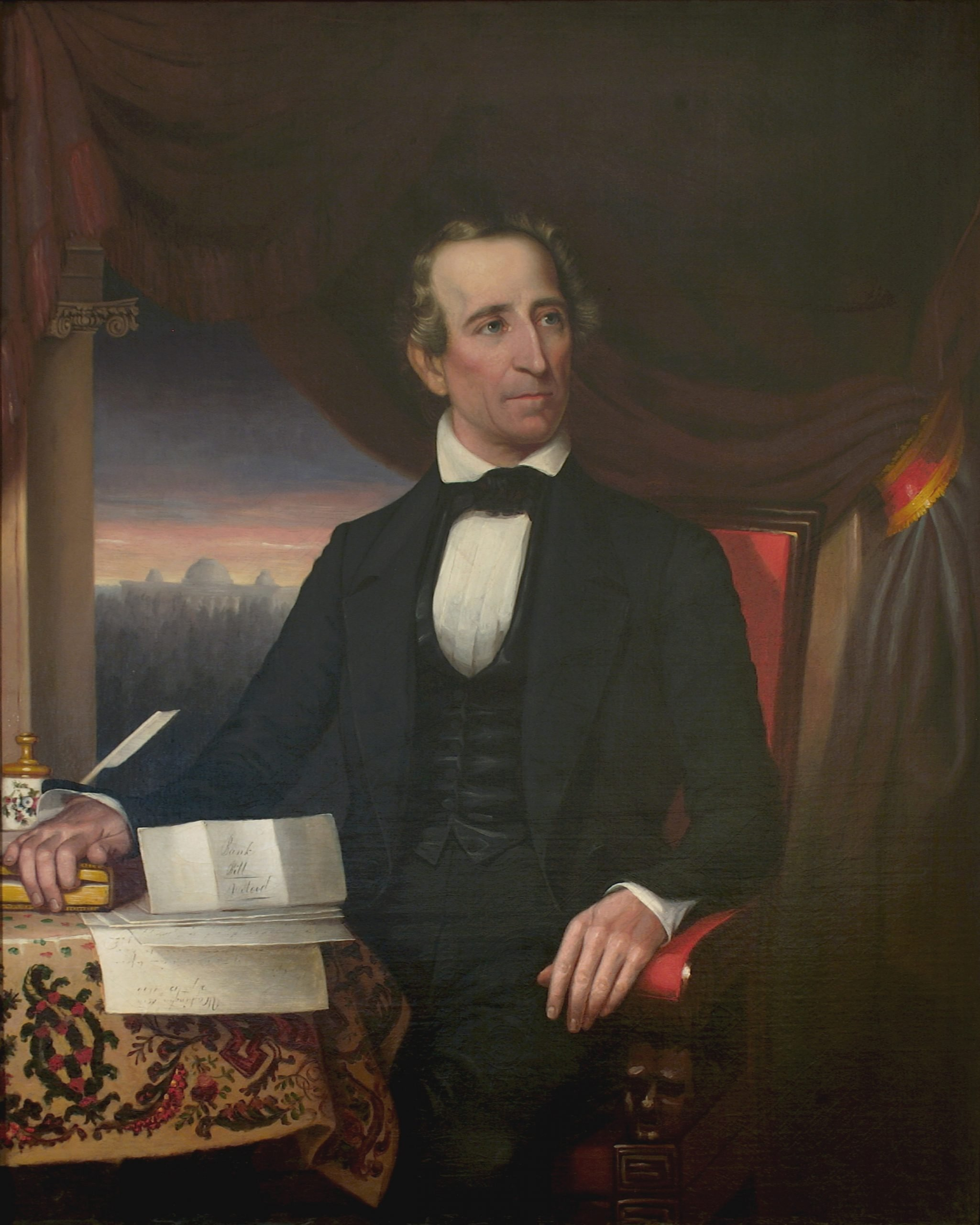
John Tyler

The presidency of John Tyler began on April 4, 1841, when John Tyler became president of the United States upon the death of President William Henry Harrison, and ended on March 4, 1845, upon the completion of Harrison's term.

== 1841 ==
=== April 1841 ===
- April 4
  - Vice President John Tyler becomes the tenth president of the United States following the death of President William Henry Harrison. This is the first time the vice president has filled a vacancy in the presidency.
  - Tyler retains Harrison's cabinet, with Daniel Webster as secretary of state, Thomas Ewing as secretary of the treasury, John Bell as secretary of war, John J. Crittenden as attorney general, Francis Granger as postmaster general, and George Edmund Badger as secretary of the navy.
- April 6 – Tyler is inaugurated as the tenth president of the United States.
- April 9 – Tyler gives an address outlining his intentions as president. He advocates direct appropriations that cannot be subject to interpretation by bureaucrats and criticizes government debt in peacetime.

=== May 1841 ===
- May 31 – The 27th United States Congress convenes for its first session.

=== June 1841 ===
- June 1 – Tyler addresses a special session of Congress that had been convened by Harrison. He advocates westward expansion of the United States and requests restrictions on state banks.
- June 30
  - Tyler delivers a special message to the House of Representatives on behalf of New York requesting that Congress pass a bankruptcy law.
  - A law is passed granting Julia Gardiner Tyler, the widow of President Harrison, a pension of $25,000 (equivalent to $738,000 in 2024).

=== July 1841 ===
- July 15 – Tyler nominates Peleg Sprague to the District Court for the District of Massachusetts. He nominates Abner Nash Ogden to the District Courts for the District of Eastern Louisiana and the District of Western Louisiana, but Ogden declines.
- July 21 – A law is passed authorizing the federal government to borrow up to $12 million.

=== August 1841 ===
- August 13 – The Independent Treasury Act of 1840 is repealed, mandating that funds be removed from the act's depositories.
- August 16
  - Tyler vetoes a bill that would "incorporate the subscribers to the Fiscal Bank of the United States". He believes that the federal government does not have this power under the Constitution.
  - The frigate USS Congress is launched at the Portsmouth Naval Shipyard.
- August 19 – The Bankruptcy Act of 1841 is passed, establishing uniform bankruptcy laws for the nation.

=== September 1841 ===
- September 1 – Tyler nominates Theodore Howard McCaleb to the District Courts for the District of Eastern Louisiana and the District of Western Louisiana.
- September 4 – The Preemption Act of 1841 is passed. It authorizes the sale of public land for $1.25 per acre to fund internal improvements.
- September 9 – Tyler vetoes a law that would have effectively restored the Bank of the United States.
- September 11 – Tyler's cabinet resigns in protest of Tyler's veto two days previously, with the exception of Secretary of State Daniel Webster.
- September 13
  - Walter Forward succeeds Thomas Ewing as secretary of the treasury, Hugh S. Legaré succeeds John J. Crittenden as attorney general, Charles A. Wickliffe succeeds Francis Granger as postmaster general, and Abel P. Upshur succeeds George E. Badger as secretary of the navy.
  - Congress passes a resolution written by members of the Whig Party, condemning Tyler and disavowing him from the party.
  - The 27th United States Congress adjourns from its first session.
- September 25 – Tyler issues a proclamation stating that American citizens who commit crimes in Canada will be prosecuted.

=== October 1841 ===
- October 12 – John Canfield Spencer succeeds John Bell as secretary of war.

=== December 1841 ===
- December 6 – The 27th United States Congress convenes for its second session.
- December 7 – Tyler delivers the 1841 State of the Union Address.
- December 22 – The frigate USS Mississippi is commissioned for the United States Navy prior to its launching at the Philadelphia Navy Yard in early 1842.

== 1842 ==
=== January 1842 ===
- January – The Supreme Court issues its decision in Prigg v. Pennsylvania. It rules that state law cannot interfere with federal laws regarding the capture of slaves who escaped across state lines.
- January 17 – Tyler delivers a special message to the Senate declaring the resolution of a boundary dispute between the Republic of Texas and the United States.
- January 18 – Tyler nominates Horace Binney to the District Court for the Eastern District of Pennsylvania, but Binney declines.
- January 25 – The Supreme Court issues its decision in Swift v. Tyson. It rules that federal courts can interpret state law through "general commercial law" instead of being bound to interpretations by the state courts.

=== February 1842 ===
- February 5 – Tyler nominates Thomas Bradford to the District Court for the Eastern District of Pennsylvania, but the Senate rejects his nomination.
- February 9 – A resolution is passed to form a committee to investigate the New York Custom House.

=== March 1842 ===
- March – The Massachusetts Supreme Judicial Court issues its decision in Commonwealth v. Hunt. It rules that trade unions cannot be prosecuted as criminal conspiracies and their right to strike is legally protected in Massachusetts.
- March 1 – The Supreme Court issues its decision in Prigg v. Pennsylvania. It rules that per the Supremacy Clause states cannot interfere with the Fugitive Slave Act of 1793 but do not have to assist in its enforcement. This allows for a significant expansion of the Underground Railroad.
- March 3 – Tyler nominates Archibald Randall to the District Court for the Eastern District of Pennsylvania.
- March 4 – The Supreme Court issues its decision in Dobbins v. Erie County. It rules that states cannot tax federal offices.
- March 8 – Tyler requests that Congress pass legislation that gave the federal government supremacy over the states in regard to deportation law.
- March 12 – Tyler criticizes the Senate for rejecting his nominee for survey-general of Illinois Territory and Missouri Territory, and he renominates.
- March 17 – The United States signs a treaty with the Wyandot people.
- March 23 – Tyler tells Congress that he cannot comply with a resolution that would allow the House of Representatives control over presidential appointments.
- March 25 – Tyler asks Congress to address the government debt.

=== April 1842 ===
- April 4 – Tyler nominates Charles Dewey to the District Court for the District of Indiana, but Dewey declines.
- April 7 – Tyler submits a report to Congress on the boundary dispute between the United States and British Canada.
- April 8 – Tyler nominates Samuel Prentiss to the District Court for the District of Vermont.
- April 16 – The brigs USS Somers and USS Truxtun are launched at the New York Navy Yard and the Gosport Navy Yard, respectively.
- April 26
  - Tyler nominates Elisha Mills Huntington to the District Court for the District of Indiana.
  - The brig USS Bainbridge is launched at the Boston Navy Yard.

=== May 1842 ===
- May 5 – The frigate USS Savannah is launched at the New York Navy Yard.
- May 10 – Tyler condemns Florida for engaging in conflict with Indian forces. He asks Congress to offer land grants for families who move to Florida.
- May 16 – Tyler authorizes Congress to issue brevets for veterans who served in Florida.
- May 20 – The United States signs the Third Treaty of Buffalo Creek with the Seneca people.
- May 24 – The USS Cumberland is launched at the Boston Navy Yard.

=== June 1842 ===
- June 25 – The Apportionment Act of 1842 ties House elections to individual districtss instead of state-wide elections. Tyler criticizes the law as potentially unconstitutional.

=== July 1842 ===
- July 22 – Representative John Botts formally proposes that Tyler be impeached.
- July 26 – The sloop-of-war USS Saratoga is launched at the Portsmouth Navy Yard.

=== August 1842 ===
- August 9
  - The United States signs the Webster–Ashburton Treaty with the United Kingdom. It resolves a border dispute between Maine and the British colony of New Brunswick, allowing the two countries to normalize relations.
  - Tyler vetoes a tariff because it is above 20 percent and does not sufficiently restrict the distribution of land sale proceeds. A select committee led by Representative John Quincy Adams is formed in response.
- August 11 – Tyler submits documents on the border dispute with British Canada on Congress.
- August 16 – The House Select Committee formed in response to Tyler's veto determines that Tyler is abusing his power to veto legislation. It recommends amending the constitution to reduce the president's veto power.
- August 17 – The House votes on proposing an amendment to the Constitution to make it easier to override a presidential veto. The vote is 98 in favor and 90 opposed, which fails to meet the required supermajority.
- August 26 – A law is passed defining the start of the fiscal year as July 1.
- August 29 – A law is passed authorizing Supreme Court and district court judges to issue writs of habeas corpus.
- August 30
  - Tyler signs the Tariff Act of 1842 despite his opposition to a tariff above 20 percent. It reverts American tariffs to their state in 1832.
  - Distribution of lands under the Preemption Act of 1841 is halted.
  - Tyler condemns the House Select Committee's accusation that he was abusing his power and accuses the House of violating the Constitution by criticizing him without offering him a chance to respond. The House rejects Tyler's message and does not enter it into record.
- August 31 – The 27th United States Congress adjourns from its second session.

=== September 1842 ===
- September 10 – Tyler's wife, Letitia Christian Tyler, dies.

=== October 1842 ===
- October 4 – The United States signs the Treaty of La Pointe with the Chippewa.
- October 11 – The United States signs a treaty with the Sauk people and Fox people.

=== November 1842 ===
- November – The Democratic Party takes control of the House of Representatives from the Whig Party in the 1842 House of Representatives elections while maintaining control of the Senate.

=== December 1842 ===
- December 5 – The 27th United States Congress convenes for its third session.
- December 6 – Tyler delivers the 1842 State of the Union Address.
- December 30 – Tyler asks Congress to establish relations with China and with the Hawaiian Kingdom. He discourages the colonization of islands in the Pacific.

== 1843 ==
=== January 1843 ===
- January 10 – The House of Representatives votes against a proposal to impeach Tyler.

=== February 1843 ===
- February 18 – Tyler announces the dismissal of Captain Thomas ap Catesby Jones for his Capture of Monterey against Mexico.
- February 20 – The Supreme Court issues its decision in Louisville Railroad Co. v. Letson. It rules that corporations are under the jurisdiction of the state that chartered it. This overturns Bank of the United States v. Deveaux.
- February 23 – The Supreme Court issues its decision in Bronson v. Kinzie. It rules that states cannot pass laws that retroactively change financial agreements because this violates the Contract Clause of the Constitution.

=== March 1843 ===
- March 3
  - Congress allocates $30,000 to initiate a project led by Samuel Morse to build telegraph lines in the United States.
  - The Bankruptcy Act of 1841 is repealed.
  - Secretary of War John Canfield Spencer succeeds Walter Forward as secretary of the treasury.
  - The 27th United States Congress adjourns from its third session.
- March 8 – James Madison Porter succeeds John Canfield Spencer as secretary of war.

=== May 1843 ===
- May 8 – Daniel Webster resigns as secretary of state.
- May 22 – Migration across the Oregon Trail begins when over one hundred wagons depart from Independence, Missouri.

=== June 1843 ===
- June 13 – The frigate USS Raritan is launched at the Philadelphia Navy Yard.
- June 17 – The Bunker Hill Monument is dedicated in Boston with Tyler in attendance.
- June 20 – Attorney General Hugh S. Legare dies.

=== July 1843 ===
- July 1 – John Nelson succeeds Hugh S. Legare as attorney general.
- July 24 – Secretary of the Navy Abel P. Upshur succeeds Daniel Webster secretary of state. David Henshaw succeeds Usher as secretary of the navy.

=== August 1843 ===
- August 1 – The brig USS Lawrence is launched at Baltimore.

=== September 1843 ===
- September 5 – The screw steam USS Princeton is launched at the Philadelphia Navy Yard.

=== October 1843 ===
- October 13 – The brig USS Perry is commissioned for the United States Navy following its launching at the Norfolk Navy Yard in March.
- October 23 – The sloop-of-war USS Portsmouth is launched at the Portsmouth Navy Yard.

=== November 1843 ===
- November 9 – The United States signs an extradition treaty with France.

=== December 1843 ===
- December 4 – The 28th United States Congress convenes for its first session.
- December 5
  - Tyler delivers the 1843 State of the Union Address.
  - The sidewheel steamer USS Michigan is launched at Erie, Pennsylvania. It is the first iron-hulled ship of the United States Navy.
- December 18 – Tyler vetoes a resolution to give money to commissioners who oversee a treaty with the Cherokee.

== 1844 ==
=== January 1844 ===
- January 8 – Tyler nominates John Canfield Spencer to the Supreme Court, but the Senate rejects his nomination.

=== February 1844 ===
- February 15 – William Wilkins succeeds James M. Porter as secretary of war and Thomas Walker Gilmer succeeds David Henshaw as secretary of the navy.
- February 23 – Tyler asks Congress to fund the completion of naval ships under construction.
- February 29 – Tyler issues an executive order announcing the deaths of Secretary of State Abel P. Upshur, Secretary of the Navy Thomas W. Gilmer, and a federal judge.

=== March 1844 ===
- March 1 – The United States finishes its exchange of notes with Venezuela to compensate the United States for the brig Morris.
- March 6
  - John C. Calhoun succeeds Abel P. Upshur as secretary of state.
  - The United States signs a postal convention with Colombia.
- March 13 – Tyler nominates Reuben H. Walworth to the Supreme Court, but later withdraws the nomination.
- March 14 – John Y. Mason succeeds Thomas W. Gilmer as secretary of the navy.
- March 26 – The United States signs a treaty with Grand Duchy of Hesse abolishing emigration taxes and the practice of droit d'aubaine.

=== April 1844 ===
- April 2 – Tyler nominates John Beverly Christian to the District Court for the Eastern District of Virginia, but the Senate rejects his nomination.
- April 3 – The sloop-of-war USS Plymouth is launched at the Boston Navy Yard.
- April 9 – Tyler delivers a message to the House on the Dorr Rebellion in Rhode Island.
- April 10 – The United States signs a treaty with the Kingdom of Württemberg abolishing emigration taxes and the practice of droit d'aubaine.
- April 12 – The United States signs a treaty with the Republic of Texas to move toward annexation of Texas into the United States.
- April 22 – Tyler asks the Senate to approve the treaty to annex Texas.

=== May 1844 ===
- May 1 – The 1844 Whig National Convention takes place. The Whig Party selects Henry Clay as its presidential nominee.
- May 24 – The Baltimore–Washington telegraph line is completed.
- May 27 – The 1844 Democratic National Convention is held. The Democratic Party selects James K. Polk as its presidential nominee, choosing him over the expected candidate, former president Martin Van Buren. Supporters of Tyler hold an alternate convention, the National Democratic Tyler Convention, and nominates Tyler in the hope of influencing the main convention.

=== June 1844 ===
- June 8 – The treaty to annex Texas is rejected by the Senate.
- June 15
  - George M. Bibb succeeds Walter Forward as secretary of the treasury.
  - Tyler nominates R.R. Collier to the District Court for the Eastern District of Virginia, but the Senate rejects his nomination the same day. Tyler then nominates James Dandridge Halyburton to the seat.
- June 17
  - Tyler nominates John Canfield Spencer to the Supreme Court but then withdraws the nomination and nominates Reuben H. Walworth. No confirmation vote is held.
  - The 28th United States Congress adjourns from its first session.
- June 26 – Tyler marries Julia Gardiner. This is the first time an American president has wed while in office.
- June 28 – A reception is held in the Blue Room of the White House to celebrate the wedding of John Tyler and Julia Gardiner.

=== July 1844 ===
- July 3 – The United States signs the Treaty of Wanghia with China. This is the first treaty between the two countries. It establishes trade with several Chinese ports.

=== August 1844 ===
- August 20 – Tyler chooses not to seek reelection and endorses James K. Polk for president.

=== November 1844 ===
- November 4 – The 1844 presidential election takes place. James K. Polk is elected president.

=== December 1844 ===
- December 2 – The 28th United States Congress convenes for its second session.
- December 3 – Tyler delivers the 1844 State of the Union Address.
- December 4 – Tyler nominates Edward King and Reuben H. Walworth to the Supreme Court, but he will later withdraw both nominations.
- December 12 – The sloop-of-war USS Jamestown is commissioned by the United States Navy after its launching at the Gosport Navy Yard earlier in the year.

== 1845 ==
=== January 1845 ===
- January 21 – The United States signs a treaty with the Kingdom of Bavaria abolishing emigration taxes and the practice of droit d'aubaine.
- January 22 – Tyler proposes sending a diplomatic representative to China and establishing protections for Americans working in China.
- January 23 – A law is passed designating a single national election day on "Tuesday next after the first Monday in the month of November".

=== February 1845 ===
- February 4 – Tyler nominates Samuel Nelson to the Supreme Court of the United States.
- February 7 – Tyler nominates John M. Read to the Supreme Court, but no confirmation vote is held.
- February 12 – Congress counts the votes of the electoral college.
- February 14 – The Senate confirms Tyler's nomination of Samuel Nelson to the Supreme Court.
- February 20
  - Tyler vetoes a law on revenue cutters and steamers because he believes it would put the United States in violation of contracts.
  - Tyler condemns attempts to circumvent restrictions on the slave trade.
- February 28 – Congress passes a joint resolution authorizing the annexation of Texas.

=== March 1845 ===
- March 1 – Tyler signs the Joint Resolution for Annexation of Texas.
- March 3
  - Florida is admitted as the 27th state of the United States. Its admission had been delayed until Iowa was authorized to become a state, so there would be a free state to balance Florida's admission as a slave state.
  - A law is passed authorizing the postmaster general to award contracts for the transportation of mail to foreign countries.
  - Congress overrides Jackson's February 20 veto.
  - The 28th United States Congress adjourns from its second session.
- March 4 – Tyler's term ends and James K. Polk is inaugurated as the 11th president of the United States.

== Works cited ==
- Bevans, Charles I. (1968). Treaties and Other International Agreements of the United States of America, 1776-1949. United States Department of State.
- Hall, Kermit L.; Ely, James W., eds. (2009). The Oxford Guide to United States Supreme Court Decisions (2nd ed.). Oxford University Press.
- Stathis, Stephen W. (2014). Landmark Legislation 1774–2012: Major U.S. Acts and Treaties (2nd ed.). CQ Press. ISBN 978-1-4522-9230-4.
