= Timeline of the James K. Polk presidency =

James K. Polk in 1849

The presidency of James K. Polk began on March 4, 1845, when James K. Polk was inaugurated as the 11th president of the United States, and ended on March 4, 1849, after one term.

== 1845 ==
=== March 1845 ===
- March 4 – James K. Polk is inaugurated as the eleventh president of the United States. George M. Dallas becomes vice president.
- March 6 – James Buchanan becomes secretary of state, Robert J. Walker becomes secretary of the treasury, William L. Marcy becomes secretary of war, John Y. Mason becomes attorney general, Cave Johnson becomes postmaster general, and George Bancroft becomes secretary of the navy.
- March 28 – Mexico breaks relations with the United States.

=== May 1845 ===
- May 14 – The United States signs a convention of abolition of droit d'aubaine and taxes on emigration with Saxony.

=== June 1845 ===
- June 15 – Polk instructs General Zachary Taylor to position troops near the Rio Grande in Texas.
- June 25 – Zachary Taylor receives his instructions to send troops to the border with Mexico.

=== July 1845 ===
- July 1 – John L. O'Sullivan gives a speech supporting Texas annexation. He coins the term manifest destiny to describe a natural right to westward expansion.
- July 4 – Congress votes in support of Texas annexation.

=== September 1845 ===
- September – The Great Famine begins in Ireland. Irish immigration to the United States increases.
- September 16 – Polk appoints John Slidell to secretly negotiate the purchase of Alta California and New Mexico.
- September 20 – Polk appoints Levi Woodbury to the Supreme Court of the United States as a recess appointment.

=== October 1845 ===
- October 3 – James Dunlop is appointed to the Circuit Court of the District of Columbia as a recess appointment.
- October 10 – The United States Naval Academy opens in Annapolis, Maryland.
- October 17 – Polk receives news that Mexico will accept a diplomat from the United States.

=== November 1845 ===
- November 10 – The United States signs a treaty of commerce and navigation with Belgium.

=== December 1845 ===
- December 1
  - The 29th United States Congress convenes for its first session.
  - The United States signs a treaty of commerce and navigation with the Kingdom of the Two Sicilies.
- December 2 – Polk delivers the 1845 State of the Union Address. He says that European nations should not colonize the Western Hemisphere and that negotiations are continuing with the United Kingdom for control over the Oregon Country.
- December 9 – Polk informs Congress that terms have been agreed on with Texas for annexation.
- December 23 – Polk nominates George Washington Woodward and his recess appointment Levi Woodbury to the Supreme Court.
- December 27 – The United Kingdom proposes reconsidering the establishment of the 49th parallel as a border between the United States and British Canada.
- December 29 – Texas is admitted as the 28th state.

== 1846 ==
=== January 1846 ===
- January 3 – The Senate confirms Polk's nomination of Levi Woodbury to the Supreme Court.
- January 13 – Polk orders General Zachary Taylor to send troops to the left bank of the Rio Grande.
- January 14
  - John White Brockenbrough receives his commission for the District Court for the District of West Virginia.
  - The United States signs a treaty with the Kansa people.
- January 22 – The Senate rejects Polk's nomination of George Washington Woodward to the Supreme Court.
- January 29 – The Senate ratifies an extradition treaty with Prussia.

=== February 1846 ===
- February 3 – Polk's recess appointment James Dunlop receives his commission for the Circuit Court of the District of Columbia.
- February 4 – Brigham Young and the Mormon pioneers begin their migration to present-day Utah.

=== March 1846 ===
- March 24 – Polk asks Congress to expand the military in preparation of conflict with Mexico.

=== April 1846 ===
- April 13 – Polk asks Congress to divide the lands of the Cherokee.
- April 25 – Mexican forces defeat an American reconnaissance unit in the Thornton Affair. This is the first battle of the Mexican–American War.
- April 27 – Congress authorizes Polk to end the joint occupation of Oregon Country with the United Kingdom.

=== May 1846 ===
- May 8 – The United States wins the Battle of Palo Alto.
- May 9 – The United States wins the Battle of Resaca de la Palma.
- May 11 – Polk asks Congress for a declaration of war against Mexico.
- May 13 – The United States declares war on Mexico.
- May 14 – Polk meets with General Winfield Scott and Secretary of War William L. Marcy to develop a war strategy.
- May 15 – The United States signs a treaty with several tribes in Texas.
- May 27 – The United States signs a convention of abolition of droit d'aubaine and taxes on emigration with the Duchy of Nassau.
- May 29 – John Charles Watrous receives his commission for the District Court for the District of Texas.

=== June 1846 ===
- June 5 – The United States signs a treaty with the Chippewa people, the Ottawa people, and the Potawatomi people.
- June 10 – The United States signs a treaty of commerce and navigation with the Kingdom of Hanover.
- June 14 – American settlers capture Sonoma from Mexico and declare it the California Republic.
- June 15 – The Oregon Treaty establishes a border between the United States and British Canada at the 49th parallel.
- June 18 – John K. Kane receives his commission for the District Court for the Eastern District of Pennsylvania.
- June 27 – The sloop-of-war USS Albany is launched at the New York Navy Yard.

=== July 1846 ===
- July 9 – Polk signs an act authorizing the retrocession of territory in Washington, D.C. to Virginia.
- July 30 – The Walker tariff is passed to lower tariff rates, returning them to the level of the Tariff of 1833.

=== August 1846 ===
- August 3
  - Polk nominates Robert Cooper Grier to the Supreme Court.
  - Polk vetoes a bill that would fund internal improvements. He says it is unconstitutional because it favors some areas over others.
- August 4
  - Polk informs the Senate that he intends to begin peace negotiations with Mexico.
  - The Senate confirms Polk's nomination of Robert Cooper Grier to the Supreme Court.
- August 5 – Polk asks Congress to form the Oregon Territory following the ratification of the Oregon Treaty.
- August 6
  - Independent Treasury is signed into law.
  - The Warehousing Act creates government warehouses for private goods to be stored under government bond.
  - Wisconsin is authorized to create a state government and a state constitution.
  - The United States signs a treaty with the Cherokee people.
- August 8
  - Polk vetoes a bill relating to French spoliation claims.
  - Isaac H. Bronson receives his commission for the District Court for the District of Florida.
- August 10
  - The Smithsonian Institution is established.
  - The 29th United States Congress adjourns from its first session.
- August 22 – The sloop-of-war USS Germantown is launched at the Philadelphia Navy Yard.

=== September 1846 ===
- September 25 – The Battle of Monterrey concludes.

=== October 1846 ===
- October 13 – The United States signs a treaty with the Winnebago people.
- October 17 – Nathan Clifford succeeds John Y. Mason as attorney general.

=== November 1846 ===
- November – The 1846 United States elections take place. The Whig Party takes control of the House.

=== December 1846 ===
- December 7 – The 29th United States Congress convenes for its second session.
- December 8 – Polk delivers the 1846 State of the Union Address.
- December 12 – The United States signs a treaty of peace, amity, navigation, and commerce with the Republic of New Granada.
- December 28 – Iowa is admitted as the 29th state.

== 1847 ==
=== February 1847 ===
- February 22
  - American forces led by General Zachary Taylor win the Battle of Buena Vista against Mexico.
  - The iron-hulled steamship USS Allegheny is launched at Pittsburgh.
- February 23 – The United States wins the Battle of Buena Vista. This is the war's final battle in northern Mexico.

=== March 1847 ===
- March 3
  - John James Dyer and William Marvin receive their commissions for the District Courts for the District of Iowa and Southern District of Florida, respectively.
  - The Postage Stamp Act of 1847 authorizes the use of postage stamps in the United States.
  - Congress allocates $3 million for peace negotiations with Mexico.
  - The 29th United States Congress adjourns from its second session.
- March 5 – The Supreme Court issues its decision in Jones v. Van Zandt. It rules that the Fugitive Slave Act of 1793 does not violate the Due Process Clause of the Constitution and is within the powers allowed to the federal government by the Fugitive Slave Clause.
- March 6 – The Supreme Court issues its decision in the License Cases. It rules that states can impose regulation and taxation on alcohol imported from other states. This will influence the selective exclusiveness principle applied by the Supreme Court for the next century.
- March 10 – The United States signs a treaty of commerce and navigation with Grand Duchy of Oldenburg.
- March 29 – The United States captures Veracruz in the Siege of Veracruz.

=== May 1847 ===
- May 18 – The United States signs a convention of disposal of property with Switzerland.

=== June 1847 ===
- June 22 – Polk departs on a tour of the northern states. He travels to Maryland, Pennsylvania, New York, Connecticut, Massachusetts, New Hampshire, Maine, and New Jersey.

=== July 1847 ===
- July 7 – Polk returns from his tour of northern states.
- July 22 – Mormon pioneers arrive in the Salt Lake Valley.

=== August 1847 ===
- August 2 – The United States signs a treaty with the Chippewa people.
- August 21 – The United States signs a treaty with the Chippewa Pillager Band.

=== September 1847 ===
- September 8 – The Battle of Molino del Rey takes place.
- September 13 – The Battle of Chapultepec takes place.
- September 14 – American forces led by General Winfield Scott capture Mexico City in the Battle for Mexico City.

=== November 1847 ===
- November 29 – The Cayuse people launch an attack killing 14 people at a Christian mission in Oregon.

=== December 1847 ===
- December 6 – The 30th United States Congress convenes for its first session.
- December 7 – Polk delivers the 1847 State of the Union Address.
- December 9 – The United States signs a treaty of commerce and navigation with the Grand Duchy of Mecklenburg-Schwerin.
- December 15 – Polk pocket vetoes a bill that would fund internal improvements in Wisconsin Territory. He argues that it also funds internal improvements beyond Wisconsin Territory.

== 1848 ==
=== January 1848 ===
- January 12 – Polk declines to provide the House access to instructions he gave to John Slidell in negotiations with Mexico.
- January 24 – The California gold rush begins when James W. Marshall discovers gold in California.
- January 31 – The Supreme Court issues its decision in West River Bridge Company v. Dix. It rules that the Contract Clause does not prohibit the use of eminent domain on the property of an entity franchised with the government.

=== February 1848 ===
- February 2 – Diplomat Nicholas Trist signs the Treaty of Guadalupe Hidalgo with Mexico to end the Mexican–American War.The United States signs a treaty of commerce and navigation with Belgium.
- February 23 – The Senate receives the Treaty of Guadalupe Hidalgo.
- February 29 – The United States signs a peace treaty with Mexico.

=== March 1848 ===
- March 10 – The Senate ratifies the Treaty of Guadalupe Hidalgo.
- March 18 – Nathan Clifford resigns as attorney general.

=== May 1848 ===
- May 8 – The United States signs a treaty of commerce and navigation with the Austrian Empire.
- May 18 – Polk writes to J. G. M. Ramsey reiterating his intention to only serve one term as president.
- May 29
  - Polk asks Congress to establish the Oregon Territory following the November attack on a mission in Oregon.
  - Wisconsin is admitted as the 30th state.

=== June 1848 ===
- June 12 – Andrew G. Miller receives his commission for the District Court for the District of Wisconsin.
- June 21 – Isaac Toucey succeeds Nathan Clifford as attorney general.

=== July 1848 ===
- July 4
  - The Treaty of Guadalupe Hidalgo takes effect, formally establishing peace between Mexico and the United States.
  - The cornerstone is laid for the Washington Monument with Polk in attendance.
- July 12 – The Seneca Falls Convention is held to promote women's rights in the United States.

=== August 1848 ===
- August 6 – The United States signs a treaty with the Pawnee people.
- August 14
  - The creation of Oregon Territory is authorized.
  - The 30th United States Congress adjourns from its first session.
- August 17 – The frigate USS St. Lawrence is commissioned after beginning construction in 1826 and being launched in early 1848.

=== October 1848 ===
- October 18 – The United States signs a treaty with the Menominee people.

=== November 1848 ===
- November – The 1848 United States elections take place. Zachary Taylor is elected president. The Democratic Party takes control of the House.
- November 14 – The sloop-of-war USS Saranac is launched at the Portsmough Navy Yard.
- November 24 – The United States signs a treaty with the Stockbridge people.

=== December 1848 ===
- December 4 – The 30th United States Congress convenes for its second session.
- December 5 – Polk delivers the 1848 State of the Union Address. He announces the discovery of gold in California.
- December 15 – The United States signs a postal convention with the United Kingdom.
- December 29 – Gas lighting is installed in the White House.

== 1849 ==
=== January 1849 ===
- January 3 – The Supreme Court issues its decision in Luther v. Borden. It rules that the Guarantee Clause of the Constitution does not compel the court to evaluate whether states have a "Republican Form of Government".

=== February 1849 ===
- February 7 – The Supreme Court issues its decision in the Passenger Cases. It rules that taxes imposed by state governments on incoming passengers of ships are unconstitutional.

=== March 1849 ===
- March 3
  - The Home Department, later named the United States Department of the Interior, is established. The Bureau of Pensions, the Census Office, the General Land Office, the Office of Indian Affairs, the Office of Mines, the Office of Public Buildings, and the Patent Office are grouped under its purview.
  - The Minnesota Territory is established.
  - The United States signs a treaty of peace, amity, commerce, and navigation with Guatemala.
  - The 30th United States Congress adjourns from its second session.
  - Polk moves out of the White House.
- March 4 – Polk's term ends and Zachary Taylor becomes president of the United States. Taylor's inauguration takes place the following day because March 4 was a Sunday.

== Works cited ==
- Bevans, Charles I. (1968). Treaties and Other International Agreements of the United States of America, 1776-1949. United States Department of State.
- Hall, Kermit L.; Ely, James W., eds. (2009). The Oxford Guide to United States Supreme Court Decisions (2nd ed.). Oxford University Press.
- Stathis, Stephen W. (2014). Landmark Legislation 1774–2012: Major U.S. Acts and Treaties (2nd ed.). CQ Press. ISBN 978-1-4522-9230-4.
