= Timeline of the Millard Fillmore presidency =

The presidency of Millard Fillmore began on July 9, 1850, when Millard Fillmore became the thirteenth president of the United States upon the death of Zachary Taylor, and ended on March 4, 1853.

== 1850 ==
=== July 1850 ===
- July 9 – President Zachary Taylor dies. Millard Fillmore becomes the thirteenth president of the United States.
- July 10 – Fillmore is inaugurated as president.
- July 20 – The Cabinet from Zachary Taylor's administration resigns in protest of Fillmore's support for the Compromise of 1850.
- July 22 – Daniel Webster becomes secretary of state, John J. Crittenden becomes attorney general, and William Alexander Graham becomes secretary of the navy.
- July 23 – Thomas Corwin becomes secretary of the treasury and Nathan K. Hall becomes postmaster general.

=== August 1850 ===
- August 6 – Fillmore proclaims his support for the Compromise of 1850, his opposition to the Wilmot Proviso, and his belief that Texas should be paid to relinquish its claim on New Mexico.
- August 15 – Charles Magill Conrad becomes secretary of war and Thomas McKean Thompson McKennan becomes secretary of the interior.
- August 27 – Thomas McKean Thompson McKennan ends his tenure as secretary of the interior.

=== September 1850 ===
- September 9 – As part of the Compromise of 1850, California is admitted as the thirty-first state of the United States, the Utah Territory is established, and boundaries are drawn for New Mexico, Texas, and Utah. It permits Utah and New Mexico to become either free states or a slave states, and Texas is paid to relinquish its claim on New Mexico.
- September 12 – Alexander Hugh Holmes Stuart becomes secretary of the interior, filling the vacancy left by Thomas McKean Thompson McKennan.
- September 18 – As part of the Compromise of 1850, the Fugitive Slave Act of 1850 makes it illegal to assist runaway slaves. The law grants full jurisdiction over fugitive slaves to the federal government.
- September 20
  - As part of the Compromise of 1850, the slave trade is abolished in Washington, D.C. The law is effective January 1, 1851.
- September 28
  - Fillmore nominates Judah P. Benjamin and John P. Healey for the district courts of the Northern District and Southern District of California, respectively. The Senate confirms both nominations the same day, but both decline the offer.
  - Fillmore appoints Mormon Church leader Brigham Young as the governor of Utah Territory.
- September 30 – The 31st United States Congress adjourns from its first session.

=== October 1850 ===
- October 24 – The National Women's Rights Convention is held in Worcester.

=== November 1850 ===
- November 25 – The United States signs a convention of friendship, reciprocal establishments, commerce, and extradition with Switzerland.

=== December 1850 ===
- December 2
  - The 31st United States Congress convenes for its second session.
  - Fillmore delivers the 1850 State of the Union Address.
- December 9 – The United Kingdom cedes Horseshoe Reef to the United States.
- December 13 – The New Mexico Territory is established.
- December 23 – The Senate rejects Fillmore's nomination of John Currey to the District Court for the Northern District of California.
- December 26 – James McHall Jones receives his commission for the District Court for the Southern District of California.

== 1851 ==
=== January 1851 ===
- January 1 – The ban on selling slaves in Washington, D.C. takes effect.
- January 2 – The United States signs its first commercial treaty with El Salvador.

=== February 1851 ===
- February 15 – Shadrach Minkins becomes the first runaway slave to be arrested on the Fugitive Slave Act of 1850. He is broken free and taken to safety through the Underground Railroad.
- February 18 – Fillmore issues a proclamation calling on the enforcement of the Fugitive Slave Act to capture Shadrach Minkins.
- February 19 – Fillmore asks Congress to increase the government's power to enforce the Fugitive Slave Act.
- February 27 – Ogden Hoffman Jr. receives his commission for the district courts for the Northern District and Southern District of California.

=== March 1851 ===
- March 3
  - The Postal Act of 1851 makes several adjustments to the postal system. Among other changes, it sets the base postal rate to three cents for a half-ounce letter. Production of the three-cent silver coin begins.
  - The 31st United States Congress adjourns from its second session.

=== April 1851 ===
- April 25 – Fillmore issues a proclamation warning American citizens not to attack the Captaincy General of Cuba.

=== June 1851 ===
- June 5 – Uncle Tom's Cabin by Harriet Beecher Stowe begins publication. Its popularity increases support for abolitionism.

=== July 1851 ===
- July 4 – The cornerstone is laid for an extension of the United States Capitol.
- July 10 – The United States signs a treaty of friendship, commerce, and navigation with Costa Rica.
- July 23 – The United States signs the Treaty of Traverse des Sioux with the Sioux.
- July 25 – Gold is discovered in Oregon.
- July 26 – The United States signs a treaty of friendship, commerce, and navigation with Peru.

=== August 1851 ===
- August 5 – The United States signs the Treaty of Mendota with the Sioux.

=== September 1851 ===
- September 22 – Fillmore appoints Benjamin Robbins Curtis to the Supreme Court as a recess appointment.

=== October 1851 ===
- October 22 – Fillmore issues a proclamation warning American citizens not to attack Mexico.

=== December 1851 ===
- December 1 – The 32nd United States Congress convenes for its first session.
- December 2 – Fillmore delivers the 1851 State of the Union Address.
- December 11 – Fillmore nominates his recess appointment Benjamin Robbins Curtis to the Supreme Court.
- December 12 – Fillmore asks Congress to ratify a treaty of friendship with Costa Rica.
- December 20 – The Senate confirms Fillmore's nomination of Benjamin Robbins Curtis to the Supreme Court.

== 1852 ==
=== January 1852 ===
- January 13 – Funds are authorized to repair the Library of Congress after a fire.

=== February 1852 ===
- February 6 – The Supreme Court issues its decision in Pennsylvania v. Wheeling and Belmont Bridge Company. It rules that Pennsylvania has standing to sue for damages after Virginia constructed a bridge on the Ohio River that obstructed the passage of large steamships. The court also rules that the bridge must be raised, but Congress passes a law later in the year authorizing the bridge, and the Supreme Court will uphold the law in 1856.
- February 20 – The Supreme Court issues its decision in Genesee Chief v. Fitzhugh. It rules that federal jurisdiction includes freshwater lakes and rivers used in interstate navigation.
- February 26 – Fillmore nominates John Currey to the District Court for the Southern District of California, but the Senate does not hold a vote on the nomination.

=== March 1852 ===
- March 2 – The Supreme Court issues its decision in Cooley v. Board of Wardens. It rules that Pennsylvania is not violating the Commerce Clause by charging a fee if vessels entering or leaving the port of Philadelphia do not hire a local pilot.
- March 4 – Railroads are granted right of way in all public lands, and they are guaranteed space for necessary facilities alongside the railroad.
- March 19 – John Glenn receives his commission for the District Court for the District of Maryland.

=== April 1852 ===
- April 30 – The United States signs a convention to extend jurisdiction of consuls with with the Hanseatic Republics.

=== May 1852 ===
- May 1 – The United States enters into an agreement with Venezuela to receive compensation for several American ships.

=== June 1852 ===
- June 1 – The 1852 Democratic National Convention takes place. The Democratic Party selects Franklin Pierce as its presidential candidate, with William R. King as his running mate.
- June 16 – The United States signs a convention of extradition with German Confederation.
- June 17 – The 1852 Whig National Convention takes place. Fillmore seeks the Whig Party's presidential nomination, but it selects Winfield Scott as its presidential candidate, with William Alexander Graham as his running mate.
- June 22 – The United States signs a treaty with the Chickasaw.

=== July 1852 ===
- July 1 – The United States signs a treaty with the Apache.
- July 3 – The San Francisco Mint is authorized.
- July 5 – Frederick Douglass delivers his speech "What to the Slave Is the Fourth of July?" in Rochester, New York.
- July 22 – John P. Kennedy succeeds William Alexander Graham as secretary of the navy.

=== August 1852 ===
- August 6 – The United States enters into an agreement with Peru to financially compensate an American citizen who was detained by Peruvian president Agustín Gamarra in 1839.
- August 16 – Fillmore nominates Edward A. Bradford to the Supreme Court, but the Senate does not hold a vote on the nomination.
- August 24 – German writer Karl Marx begins publishing his work in the United States.
- August 26 – The United States signs a convention of commerce with the Netherlands.
- August 30 – The Steamboat Act of 1852 sets regulations for steamboats and grants the Department of the Treasury the authority to inspect steamboats.
- August 31
  - The United States Lighthouse Board is created within the Department of the Treasury to oversee inspections of lighthouses.
  - Samuel Dickinson Hubbard succeeds Nathan K. Hall as postmaster general.
  - Nathan K. Hall receives his commission for the District Court for the Northern District of New York.
  - The 32nd United States Congress adjourns from its first session.

=== October 1852 ===
- October 24 – Secretary of State Daniel Webster dies.

=== November 1852 ===
- November – The 1852 United States elections take place. Franklin Pierce is elected president. His Democratic Party increases its majorities over the Whig Party in both chambers of Congress. The Whig Party fractures between its northern faction and its southern faction.
- November 6 – Edward Everett becomes secretary of state, filling the vacancy left by Daniel Webster.
- November 25 – Discussion begins to create a new territory by splitting Oregon Territory.

=== December 1852 ===
- December 6
  - The 32nd United States Congress convenes for its second session.
  - Fillmore delivers the 1852 State of the Union Address.

== 1853 ==
=== January 1853 ===
- January 3 – Fillmore nominates George Edmund Badger to the Supreme Court.

=== February 1853 ===
- February 14 – Fillmore withdraws his nomination of George Edmund Badger to the Supreme Court. He nominates William C. Micou, but the Senate does not vote on the nomination.
- February 21 – The Coinage Act of 1853 is passed. It reduces the amount of silver used in coinage to prevent the overvaluation of coins. The production of gold three-dollar coins is authorized.
- February 23 – The United States signs a convention of rights, privileges, and duties of consular offices with France.

=== March 1853 ===
- March 2
  - Washington Territory is established after it is split from Oregon Territory.
  - A law is passed allowing Vice President–elect William R. King to take the oath of office in Cuba, where he is working as a diplomat.
- March 3
  - Congress authorizes a survey to begin constructing the first transcontinental railroad. The secretary of war is placed in charge of the operation.
  - The 32nd United States Congress adjourns from its second session.
- March 4 – Fillmore's term ends and Franklin Pierce is inaugurated as the fourteenth president. Fillmore will run for election in 1856 with the American Party, but he will be unsuccessful.

== Works cited ==
- Bevans, Charles I. (1968). Treaties and Other International Agreements of the United States of America, 1776-1949. United States Department of State.
- Hall, Kermit L.; Ely, James W., eds. (2009). The Oxford Guide to United States Supreme Court Decisions (2nd ed.). Oxford University Press.
- Stathis, Stephen W. (2014). Landmark Legislation 1774–2012: Major U.S. Acts and Treaties (2nd ed.). CQ Press. ISBN 978-1-4522-9230-4.
