= Bowerbank (surname) =

Bowerbank is a toponymic surname of English origin, derived from Burbank House in Dacre, Cumbria. Notable people with the surname include:

- Christopher Bowerbank (1940–2002), English architect and raconteur
- Fred Bowerbank (1880–1960), New Zealand physician and medical officer
- James Scott Bowerbank (1797–1877), British naturalist and paleontologist
- Louis Quier Bowerbank (1814–1880), British physician

== See also ==
- Hodgson v. Bowerbank, a United States Supreme Court case
- Bowerbank, Maine, a town in Maine, United States
