= Bowerbank =

Bowerbank may refer to:

- Bowerbank, Maine, a town in Maine, United States
- Bowerbank (surname), an English surname
