= Timeline of the Zachary Taylor presidency =

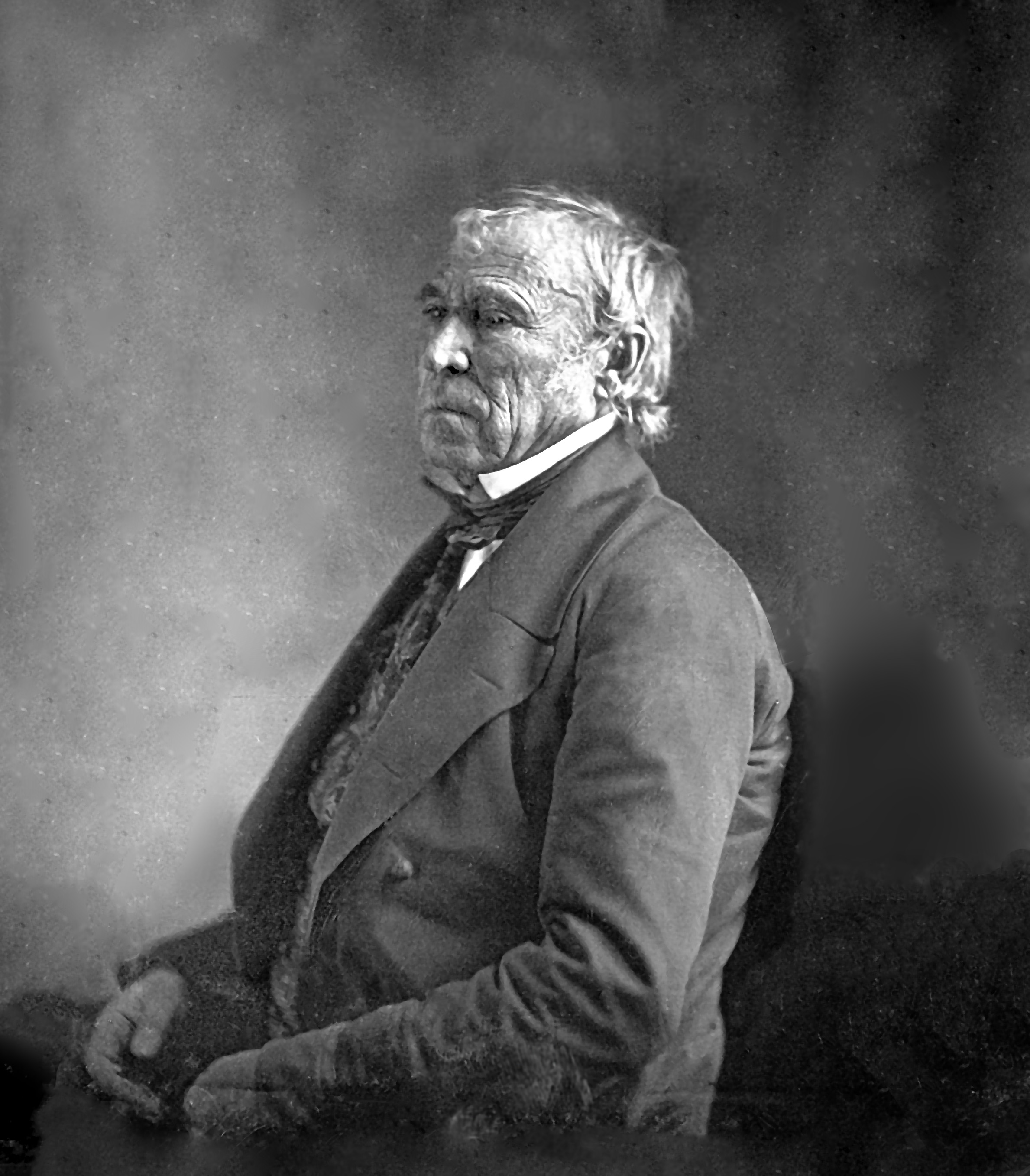
Zachary Taylor in 1849

The presidency of Zachary Taylor began on March 4, 1849, when Zachary Taylor became the twelfth president of the United States, and ended with Taylor's death on July 9, 1850.

== 1849 ==
=== March 1849 ===
- March 4 – Zachary Taylor begins his term as president of the United States. He delays his inauguration for a day so as not to hold it on a Sunday. Millard Fillmore becomes vice president.
- March 5 – Taylor is inaugurated as the twelfth president of the United States. In his inaugural address, he speaks to the importance of unity within the United States and says he will not favor any part of the nation over the others.
- March 7 – John M. Clayton becomes secretary of state.
- March 8 – William M. Meredith, George W. Crawford, Reverdy Johnson, Jacob Collamer, William B. Preston, and Thomas Ewing become secretary of the treasury, secretary of war, attorney general, postmaster general, secretary of the navy, and secretary of the interior, respectively.
- March 13 – The Senate confirms Taylor's nomination of John Gayle to the District Courts for the Northern District, Middle District and Southern District of Alabama.
- March 19 – The Senate confirms Taylor's nomination of James G. Campbell to the District Court for the Western District of Louisiana, but Campbell declines.

=== April 1849 ===
- April 3 – Secretary of State John M. Clayton sends Representative T. Butler King to represent the Taylor administration during the 1849 California Constitutional Convention.
- April 26 – Taylor appoints John K. Elgee to the District Court for the Western District of Louisiana as a recess appointment, but Elgee declines.

=== May 1849 ===
- May 9 – Taylor appoints Henry Boyce to the District Court for the Western District of Louisiana as a recess appointment.

=== July 1849 ===
- July 3 – Taylor issues a proclamation declaring a day of fasting and prayer for people affected by cholera.

=== August 1849 ===
- August 9 – Taylor departs on a tour of Maryland, Pennsylvania, and New York.
- August 11 – Taylor issues a proclamation discouraging American citizens from launching an attack against Spanish Cuba.
- August 24 – Taylor returns from his tour of Maryland, Pennsylvania, and New York.
- December 4 – Taylor delivers the 1849 State of the Union Address.

=== September 1849 ===
- September 3 – The 1849 California Constitutional Convention begins. Taylor's representative, T. Butler King, is unable to participate due to illness.
- September 9 – The United States signs a treaty with the Navajo.

=== October 1849 ===
- October 12 – The 1849 California Constitutional Convention ends with a state constitution that would prohibit slavery in California.

=== November 1849 ===
- November 5 – Taylor appoints Daniel Ringo to the District Court for the District of Arkansas as a recess appointment.

=== December 1849 ===
- December 3 – The 31st United States Congress convenes for its first session.
- December 20 – The United States signs a treaty of friendship, commerce, and navigation with the Hawaiian Kingdom.
- December 21 – Taylor nominates his recess appointment Henry Boyce for Senate confirmation to the District Court for the Western District of Louisiana. The Senate will confirm his nomination in August 1850, after Taylor's death.
- December 27 – Stephen A. Douglas introduces a petition for statehood by the State of Deseret, a region inhabited by the Latter Day Saints. This triggers broader debate in Congress about statehood in the western territories, particularly in California and New Mexico.
- December 30 – The United States signs a treaty with the Utah.

== 1850 ==
=== January 1850 ===
- January 16 – Multiple Senate proposals regarding western statehood are rejected. Senator Henry S. Foote had introduced a bill to grant territory status for California, New Mexico, and Utah. Senator Henry Dodge had introduced a bill to split Texas into multiple states. Senator Thomas Hart Benton had introduced a bill that would set state boundaries for Texas to reduce its size.
- January 20 – The United States signs a treaty of amity, navigation, and commerce with El Salvador.
- January 21
  - Senators Henry Clay and Daniel Webster meet to draft a compromise on statehood in the western United States. This forms the basis of what will become the Compromise of 1850.
  - Taylor gives Congress documents related to the governorship of California and New Mexico. He asks Congress not to grant territory status to California or New Mexico, as they had applied for statehood. He hopes that immediate statehood will prevent debate over whether they should be free states or slave states.
- January 28 – The Senate asks Taylor to release documents relating to negotiations with Central America. Taylor declines.
- January 29 – Senator Henry Clay introduces six compromise resolutions that he and Daniel Webster had drafted. They propose forming territories before addressing whether they will become free states or slave states, allowing California to decide internally whether it will be a free state or a slave state, compensating Texas to give up its claim on the territory of New Mexico, abolishing the slave trade in Washington D.C., passing a stronger fugitive slave law, and declaring the freedom of the interstate slave trade. These measures increase the likelihood of new free states being admitted, but provide stronger legal protections for slave states.

=== February 1850 ===
- February 3 – A draft of the Clayton–Bulwer Treaty is finished.
- February 5 – Senator Henry Clay gives a three-hour speech to the Senate arguing for his compromise resolutions. He has a fever of 100 degrees Fahrenheit and needs assistance walking up the stairs to speak.
- February 6 – Henry Clay gives a one hour and forty-five minute speech to the Senate defending his compromise resolutions.
- February 7 – Taylor's representative to California, T. Butler King, arrives in New York with two men elected to represent California in Congress should it become a state.
- February 14 – The sidewheel steam frigate USS Powwhatan is launched at the Norfolk Navy Yard.
- February 19 – The Senate confirms Taylor's nomination of Thomas Drummond to the District Court for the District of Illinois.
- February 21 – The cornerstone is laid for the Washington Monument, with Taylor in attendance.

=== March 1850 ===
- March 31 – Senator John C. Calhoun dies. He was a major figure in the movement for state's rights, and he had coalesced his allies against the Compromise of 1850.

=== April 1850 ===
- April 1 – The United States signs a treaty with the Wyandot people.
- April 5 – The sidewheel steam frigate USS Susquehanna is launched at the New York Navy Yard.
- April 16 – The screw frigate USS San Jacinto is launched at the New York Navy Yard.
- April 19 – The United States signs the Clayton–Bulwer Treaty with the United Kingdom.

=== May 1850 ===
- May 4 – The United States signs a convention of duties, rights, privileges, and immunities of consular officers with New Grenada.
- May 22 – The Senate ratifies the Clayton-Bulwer Treaty.

=== June 1850 ===
- June 3 – Taylor warns the Senate that some have planned on launching invasions of Cuba from the United States.
- June 10 – The Senate confirms Taylor's nomination of his recess appointment Thomas Drummond to the District Court for the District of Illinois.
- June 17 – Taylor tells the Senate that the United States Armed Forces are not involved in the border dispute between New Mexico and Texas.
- June 23 – The United States signs a treaty of peace, friendship, commerce, and navigation with Brunei.

=== July 1850 ===
- July 4
  - Taylor attends a ceremony for the Washington Monument while it is under construction. He begins to feel ill.
  - The Nashville Convention convenes to oppose the creation of free states in the western United States.
- July 6 – A physician is called to examine Taylor. He diagnoses the president with cholera morbus, the contemporary term for gastroenteritis.
- July 9 – Taylor dies from his illness. Vice President Millard Fillmore becomes the thirteenth president of the United States.

== Works cited ==
- Bevans, Charles I. (1968). Treaties and Other International Agreements of the United States of America, 1776-1949. United States Department of State.
- Bauer, K. Jack (1985). Zachary Taylor: Soldier, Planter, Statesman of the Old Southwest. Louisiana State University Press. ISBN 978-0-8071-1851-1.
