= List of United States Supreme Court cases, volume 9 =

Supreme Court of the United States
- Interactive map of Supreme Court of the United States
- 38°53′26″N 77°00′16″W
- Established: March 4, 1789; 237 years ago
- Location: Washington, D.C.
- Coordinates: 38°53′26″N 77°00′16″W
- Composition method: Presidential nomination with Senate confirmation
- Authorised by: Constitution of the United States, Art. III, § 1
- Judge term length: life tenure, subject to impeachment and removal
- Number of positions: 9 (by statute)
- Website: supremecourt.gov

This is a list of cases reported in volume 9 (5 Cranch) of United States Reports, decided by the Supreme Court of the United States in 1809.

== Nominative reports ==
In 1874, the U.S. government created the United States Reports, and retroactively numbered older privately published case reports as part of the new series. As a result, cases appearing in volumes 1–90 of U.S. Reports have dual citation forms; one for the volume number of U.S. Reports, and one for the volume number of the reports named for the relevant reporter of decisions (these are called "nominative reports").

=== William Cranch ===
Starting with the 5th volume of U.S. Reports, the Reporter of Decisions of the Supreme Court of the United States was William Cranch. Cranch was Reporter of Decisions from 1801 to 1815, covering volumes 5 through 13 of United States Reports which correspond to volumes 1 through 9 of his Cranch's Reports. As such, the complete citation to, for example, Cooke v. Woodrow is 9 U.S. (5 Cranch) 13 (1809).

== Justices of the Supreme Court at the time of 9 U.S. (5 Cranch) ==
The Supreme Court is established by Article III, Section 1 of the Constitution of the United States, which says: "The judicial Power of the United States, shall be vested in one supreme Court . . .". The size of the Court is not specified; the Constitution leaves it to Congress to set the number of justices. Under the Judiciary Act of 1789 Congress originally fixed the number of justices at six (one chief justice and five associate justices). Since 1789 Congress has varied the size of the Court from six to seven, nine, ten, and back to nine justices (always including one chief justice).

When the cases in 9 U.S. (5 Cranch) were decided, the Court comprised these seven justices:

Portrait	Justice	Office	Home State	Succeeded	Date confirmed by the Senate (Vote)	Tenure on Supreme Court
	John Marshall	Chief Justice	Virginia	Oliver Ellsworth	January 27, 1801 (Acclamation)	February 4, 1801 – July 6, 1835 (Died)
	William Cushing	Associate Justice	Massachusetts	original seat established	September 26, 1789 (Acclamation)	February 2, 1790 – September 13, 1810 (Died)
	Samuel Chase	Associate Justice	Maryland	John Blair, Jr.	January 27, 1796 (Acclamation)	February 4, 1796 – June 19, 1811 (Died)
	Bushrod Washington	Associate Justice	Virginia	James Wilson	December 20, 1798 (Acclamation)	November 9, 1798 (Recess Appointment) – November 26, 1829 (Died)
	William Johnson	Associate Justice	South Carolina	Alfred Moore	March 24, 1804 (Acclamation)	May 7, 1804 – August 4, 1834 (Died)
	Henry Brockholst Livingston	Associate Justice	New York	William Paterson	December 17, 1806 (Acclamation)	January 20, 1807 – March 18, 1823 (Died)
	Thomas Todd	Associate Justice	Kentucky	new seat	March 2, 1807 (Acclamation)	March 3, 1807 – February 7, 1826 (Died)

== Notable cases in 9 U.S. (5 Cranch) ==
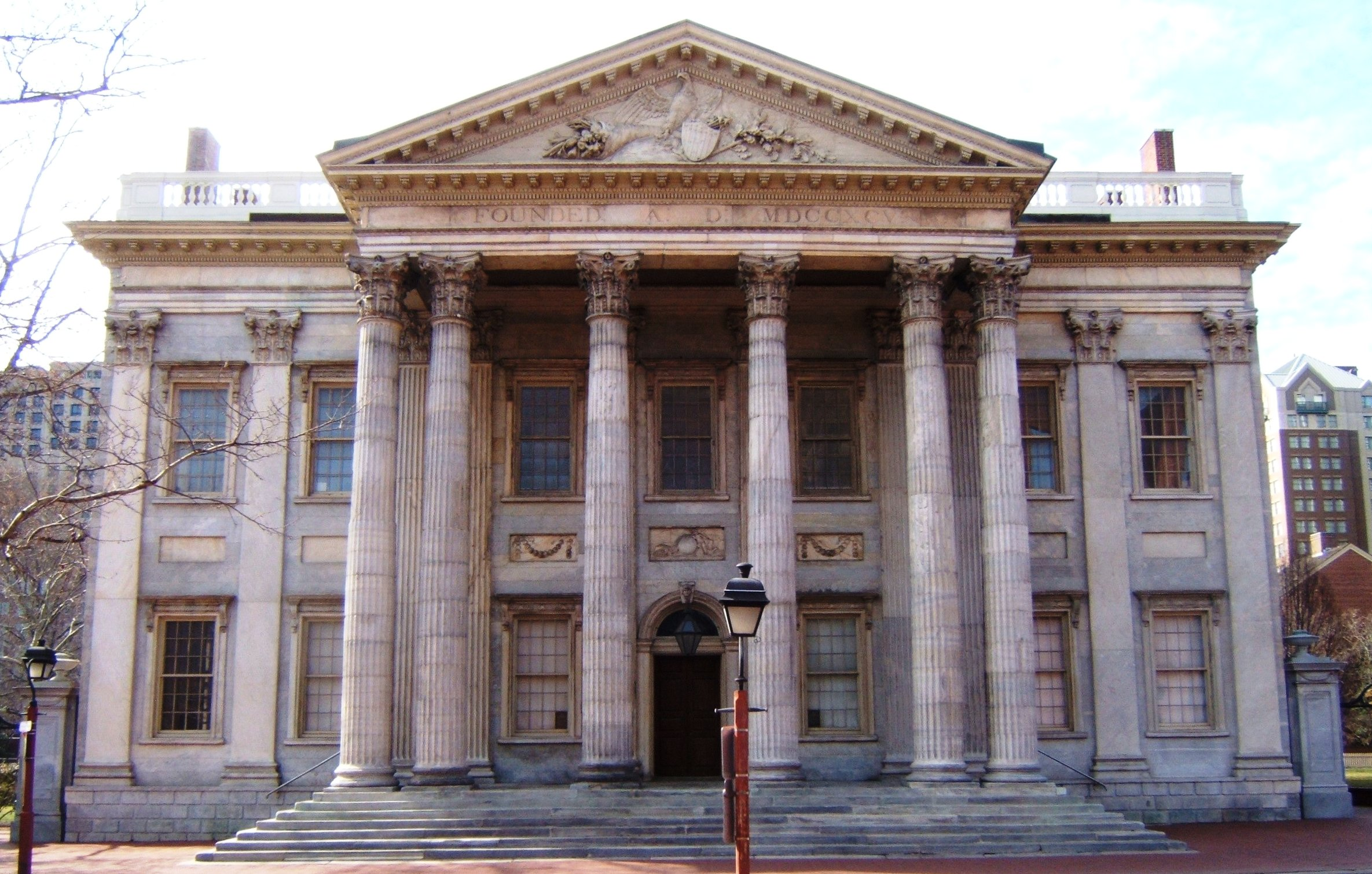
First Bank of the United States building, Philadelphia

=== Bank of the United States v. Deveaux ===
Bank of the United States v. Deveaux, 9 U.S. (5 Cranch) 61 (1809) is an early US corporate law case, in which the Court held that corporations have the capacity to sue in federal court.

=== Hodgson v. Bowerbank ===
In Hodgson v. Bowerbank, 9 U.S. (5 Cranch) 303 (1809), the Court held part of the Judiciary Act of 1789 unconstitutional. The invalidated portion had purported to confer on federal courts the jurisdiction to try cases between aliens.

== Citation style ==
Under the Judiciary Act of 1789 the federal court structure at the time comprised District Courts, which had general trial jurisdiction; Circuit Courts, which had mixed trial and appellate (from the US District Courts) jurisdiction; and the United States Supreme Court, which had appellate jurisdiction over the federal District and Circuit courts—and for certain issues over state courts. The Supreme Court also had limited original jurisdiction (i.e., in which cases could be filed directly with the Supreme Court without first having been heard by a lower federal or state court). There were one or more federal District Courts and/or Circuit Courts in each state, territory, or other geographical region.

Bluebook citation style is used for case names, citations, and jurisdictions.

- "C.C.D." = United States Circuit Court for the District of . . .
  - e.g.,"C.C.D.N.J." = United States Circuit Court for the District of New Jersey
- "D." = United States District Court for the District of . . .
  - e.g.,"D. Mass." = United States District Court for the District of Massachusetts
- "E." = Eastern; "M." = Middle; "N." = Northern; "S." = Southern; "W." = Western
  - e.g.,"C.C.S.D.N.Y." = United States Circuit Court for the Southern District of New York
  - e.g.,"M.D. Ala." = United States District Court for the Middle District of Alabama
- "Ct. Cl." = United States Court of Claims
- The abbreviation of a state's name alone indicates the highest appellate court in that state's judiciary at the time.
  - e.g.,"Pa." = Supreme Court of Pennsylvania
  - e.g.,"Me." = Supreme Judicial Court of Maine

== List of cases in 9 U.S. (5 Cranch) ==
Case Name	Page and year	Opinion of the Court	Concurring opinion(s)	Dissenting opinion(s)	Lower Court	Disposition
Alexander v. City of Alexandria	1 (1809)	Marshall	none	none	C.C.D.C.	reversed
United States v. Weeks	1 (1809)	per curiam	none	none	D. Me.	dismissed
Henderson v. Moore	11 (1809)	Marshall	none	none	C.C.D.C.	affirmed
Cooke v. Woodrow	13 (1809)	Marshall	none	none	C.C.D.C.	affirmed
Mandeville v. Wilson	15 (1809)	Marshall	none	none	C.C.D.C.	affirmed
Fairfax's Executor v. Fairfax	19 (1809)	Marshall	none	none	C.C.D.C.	reversed
M'Keen v. Delancy's Lessee	22 (1809)	Marshall	none	none	C.C.D. Pa.	affirmed
Tucker v. Oxley	34 (1809)	Marshall	none	none	C.C.D.C.	reversed
Young v. Bank of Alexandria	45 (1809)	Marshall	none	none	C.C.D.C.	affirmed
Yeaton v. Bank of Alexandria	49 (1809)	Marshall	none	Johnson	C.C.D.C.	affirmed
Hope Insurance Company v. Boardman	57 (1809)	per curiam	none	none	C.C.D.R.I.	reversed
Bank of the United States v. Deveaux	61 (1809)	Marshall	none	none	C.C.D. Ga.	reversed
Matthews v. Zane's Lessee	92 (1809)	Marshall	none	none	Ohio	affirmed
Hodgson v. Marine Insurance Company	100 (1809)	Cushing	Johnson	none	C.C.D.C.	reversed
United States v. Peters	115 (1809)	Marshall	none	none	D. Pa.	mandamus issued
Violett v. Patton	142 (1809)	Marshall	none	none	C.C.D.C.	affirmed
Pierce v. Turner	154 (1809)	Washington	none	Johnson	C.C.D.C.	affirmed
Kempe's Lessee v. Kennedy	173 (1809)	Marshall	none	none	C.C.D.N.J.	affirmed
Marine Insurance Company v. Young	187 (1809)	Cushing	none	none	C.C.D.C.	affirmed
Bodley v. Taylor	191 (1809)	Marshall	none	none	D. Ky.	affirmed
Taylor v. Brown	234 (1809)	Marshall	none	none	D. Ky.	reversed
United States v. Arthur	257 (1809)	Marshall	none	none	D. Ky.	reversed
Hepburn v. Auld	262 (1809)	Marshall	Johnson	Livingston	C.C.D.C.	reversed
United States v. Evans	280 (1809)	Marshall	none	none	D. Ky.	affirmed
Yeaton v. United States	281 (1809)	Marshall	none	none	C.C.D. Md.	reversed
United States v. Potts	284 (1809)	Marshall	none	none	C.C.D. Md.	certification
Rush v. Parker	287 (1809)	per curiam	none	Livingston	C.C.D. Md.	dismissed
Logan v. Patrick	288 (1809)	per curiam	none	none	C.C.D. Ky.	certification
Rodford v. Craig	289 (1809)	per curiam	none	none	C.C.D.S.C.	certification
Harrison v. Sterry	289 (1809)	Marshall	none	none	C.C.D.S.C.	certification
Hodgson v. Bowerbank	303 (1809)	Marshall	none	none	not indicated	not indicated
Browne v. Strode	303 (1809)	per curiam	none	none	not indicated	not indicated
Keene v. United States	304 (1809)	Livingston	none	none	C.C.D.C.	affirmed
United States v. Riddle	311 (1809)	Marshall	none	none	C.C.D.C.	affirmed
Himely v. Rose	313 (1809)	Marshall	none	Johnson	C.C.D.S.C.	reversed
Welsh v. Mandeville	321 (1809)	per curiam	none	none	not indicated	dismissed
Riddle and Company v. Mandeville	322 (1809)	Marshall	none	none	C.C.D.C.	reversed
Dulany v. Hodgkin	333 (1809)	per curiam	none	none	C.C.D.C.	affirmed
Yeaton v. Fry	335 (1809)	Marshall	none	none	C.C.D.C.	affirmed
Owings v. Norwood's Lessee	344 (1809)	Marshall	none	none	Md.	dismissed
Moss v. Riddle and Company	351 (1809)	Marshall	none	none	C.C.D.C.	affirmed
Brent v. Chapman	358 (1809)	Marshall	none	none	C.C.D.C.	affirmed
Auld v. Norwood	361 (1809)	per curiam	none	none	C.C.D.C.	affirmed
Slacum v. Simms	363 (1809)	Marshall	none	none	C.C.D.C.	reversed
United States v. Vowell	368 (1809)	Marshall	none	none	C.C.D.C.	affirmed
The Sloop Sally	372 (1809)	per curiam	none	none	D. Me.	dismissed

== See also ==
- certificate of division
