= Bank of the United States v. Deveaux =

1809 US corporate law case

- Supreme Court of the United States
- Full case name: Bank of the United States v. Deveaux

Bank of the United States v. Deveaux, 9 US 61 (1809) is an early US corporate law case decided by the US Supreme Court. It held that corporations have the capacity to sue in federal court on grounds of diversity under article three, section two of the United States Constitution. It was the first Supreme Court case to examine corporate rights and, while it is rarely featured prominently in US legal history, it set an important precedent for the legal rights of corporations, particularly with regard to corporate personhood.

The court ruled that corporations composed of citizens from one state may sue on behalf of those citizens in circuit court citizens from another state. The court specifies that while corporations may sue on behalf of citizens, corporations cannot be citizens. In other words, the court ruled that while only citizens may sue in court, they may do so under a corporate name.

== Background ==
Georgian Jeffersonian politicians first provoked a court case when, in 1805, they imposed a tax on the Bank of the United States' locally held capital. Many Jeffersonian Democrats strongly opposed the chartering of a national bank as a violation of states rights and wanted to see it dissolved. However, because state governments lack the power to directly legislate federal institutions under the supremacy clause, Jeffersonian Democrats in Georgia chose another route to fight back against the Bank: taxes. The lawmakers hoped that heavy taxes on the bank would drive it out of Georgia.

The Bank decided to ignore the tax in an act of civil disobedience, hoping that a conflict with the state would bring the question of corporate rights in front of the Supreme Court.

After the Bank refused to pay the new taxes, a Georgian tax collector named Peter Deveaux decided to take matters into his own hands, forcibly confiscating two boxes of silver from the Savannah branch of the Bank. The Bank sued Deveaux in Federal court, circumventing the Georgia state court for fear of bias. The case came in front of the Supreme Court, headed by John Marshall, a Federalist and supporter of the bank.

== Syllabus ==
William Cranch, the Reporter of Decision of the Supreme Court, summarized the decision of the court.

A corporation aggregate composed of citizens of one state may sue a citizen of another state in the circuit court of the United States.

Where the jurisdiction of the courts of the United States depends not on the character of the parties, but upon the nature of the case, the circuit courts derive no jurisdiction from the Judiciary Act except in case of a controversy between citizens of the same state claiming lands under grants from different states.

No right is conferred on the bank by its act of incorporation to sue in the federal courts. A corporation aggregate cannot, in its corporate capacity, be a citizen.

The duties of this Court to exercise jurisdiction where it is conferred and not to usurp it where it is not conferred are of equal obligation. The Constitution therefore and the law are to be expounded without a leaning the one way or the other, according to those general principles which usually govern in the construction of fundamental or other laws.

A constitution, from its nature, deals in generals, not in detail. Its framers cannot perceive minute distinctions which arise in the progress of the nation, and therefore confine it to the establishment of broad and general principles.

The Judicial Department was introduced into the American Constitution under impressions and with views which are too apparent not to be perceived by all. However true the fact may be that the tribunals of the states will administer justice as impartially as those of the nation to parties of every description, it is not less true that the Constitution itself either entertains apprehensions on this subject or views with such indulgence the possible fears and apprehensions of suitors that it has established national tribunals for the decision of controversies between aliens and a citizen or between citizens of different states.

== Judgment ==
Chief Justice John Marshall gave the leading decision.

By the Judicial Act, the jurisdiction of the circuit courts is extended to cases where the constitutional right to plead and be impleaded in the courts of the union depends on the character of the parties; but where that right depends on the nature of the case, the circuit courts derive no jurisdiction from that act except in the single case of a controversy between citizens of the same state claiming lands under grants from different states.

Unless, then, jurisdiction over this cause has been given to the circuit court by some other than the Judicial Act, the Bank of the United States had not a right to sue in that court upon the principle that the case arises under a law of the United States...

...

As our ideas of a corporation, its privileges, and its disabilities, are derived entirely from the English books, we resort to them for aid in ascertaining its character. It is defined as a mere creature of the law, invisible, intangible, and incorporeal. Yet when we examine the subject further we find that corporations have been included within terms of description appropriated to real persons.

...

In the case of King v. Gardner, reported by Cowper, a corporation was decided, by the Court of King's Bench, to come within the description of "occupiers or inhabitants." In that case, the poor rates, to which the lands of the corporation were declared to be liable, were not assessed to the actual occupant, for there was none, but to the corporation. And the principle established by the case appears to be that the poor rates on vacant ground belonging to a corporation may be assessed to the corporation as being inhabitants or occupiers of that ground. In this case Lord Mansfield notices and overrules an inconsiderate dictum of Justice Yates that a corporation could not be an inhabitant or occupier.

These opinions are not precisely in point, but they serve to show that for the general purposes and objects of a law, this invisible, incorporeal creature of the law may be considered as having corporeal qualities.

...

There is a case, however, reported in 12 Mod., which is thought precisely in point. The Corporation of London brought a suit against Wood by its corporate name in the mayor's court. The suit was brought by the mayor and commonalty, and was tried before the mayor and aldermen. The judgment rendered in this cause was brought before the Court of King's bench and reversed because the court was deprived of its jurisdiction by the character of the individuals who were members of the corporation.

In that case, the objection, that a corporation was an invisible, intangible thing, a mere incorporeal legal entity in which the characters of the individuals who composed it were completely merged, was urged and was considered. The judges unanimously declared that they could look beyond the corporate name and notice the character of the individual. In the opinions, which were delivered seriatim, several cases are put which serve to illustrate the principle, and fortify the decision.

The case of Mayor and Commonalty v. Wood is the stronger, because it is on the point of jurisdiction. It appears to the Court to be a full authority for the case now under consideration. It seems not possible to distinguish them from each other.

If, then, the Congress of the United States had in terms enacted that incorporated aliens might sue a citizen or that the incorporated citizens of one state might sue a citizen of another state in the federal courts by its corporate name, this Court would not have felt itself justified in declaring that such a law transcended the Constitution.

...

If a corporation may sue in the courts of the union, the Court is of opinion that the averment in this case is sufficient.

Being authorized to sue in it corporate name, it could make the averment, and it must apply to the plaintiffs as individuals, because it could not be true as applied to the corporation.

== See also ==
- US corporate law
