= 1845 State of the Union Address =

Speech by US President James K. Polk

- Date: December 2, 1845
- Venue: House Chamber, United States Capitol
- Location: Washington, D.C.; 38°53′23″N 77°00′32″W
- Type: State of the Union Address
- Participants: James K. Polk; George M. Dallas; John Wesley Davis
- Format: Written
- Previous: 1844 State of the Union Address
- Next: 1846 State of the Union Address

The 1845 State of the Union Address was presented by President James K. Polk to the 29th United States Congress on December 2, 1845.

== Themes ==
In his first annual address, Polk emphasized the country’s prosperity and shared his vision for America's expansion, particularly regarding the annexation of Texas, Manifest Destiny, and the settlement of the Oregon Territory. In attendance were House Speaker John W. Davis and Vice President George M. Dallas.

One of the central themes of Polk's speech was the U.S. annexation of Texas, a move that both united the American people and increased tensions with Mexico. Polk stated, "Texas had declared her independence and maintained it by her arms for more than nine years," defending U.S. involvement against claims that it violated Mexican sovereignty. To uphold Texas's security, he reported ordering the U.S. Army to deploy along the frontier between Texas and Mexico, marking an escalation in U.S.-Mexican tensions that would eventually lead to the Mexican-American War.

Polk’s message also addressed the Oregon Question and the diplomatic negotiations with Great Britain over the territory's northern boundary. He urged Congress to take measures to secure the region, stating, "All attempts at compromise having failed, it becomes the duty of Congress to consider what measures it may be proper to adopt for the security and protection of our citizens now inhabiting or who may hereafter inhabit Oregon."

Additionally, Polk highlighted domestic policy concerns, calling for adjustments to the Tariff of 1842 to reduce protective duties, thus aligning with his Democratic Party’s support for free trade. He suggested that revenue-based duties would better balance national interests and pointed out that tariffs should not impose undue burdens on American consumers.

In conclusion, Polk revisited the Monroe Doctrine, explicitly opposing European intervention in American affairs. He declared that “no future European colony or dominion shall with our consent be planted or established on any part of the North American continent," reaffirming America’s commitment to self-governance across the continent.

== See also ==
- Bibliography of James K. Polk

Preceded by 1844 State of the Union Address	State of the Union addresses 1845	Succeeded by 1846 State of the Union Address
