= 1850 State of the Union Address =

Speech by US President Millard Fillmore

- Date: December 2, 1850
- Venue: House Chamber, United States Capitol
- Location: Washington, D.C.; 38°53′23″N 77°00′32″W
- Type: State of the Union Address
- Participants: Millard Fillmore; William R. King; Howell Cobb
- Format: Written
- Previous: 1849 State of the Union Address
- Next: 1851 State of the Union Address

The 1850 State of the Union address was delivered by the 13th president of the United States Millard Fillmore to the 31st United States Congress on December 2, 1850. This was Fillmore's first address after assuming office following the death of President Zachary Taylor. In this speech, he presented his vision for the nation and the principles that would guide his administration. William R. King, the president pro tempore of the Senate, and Howell Cobb, the speaker of the United States House of Representatives, presided over the session.

== Themes ==
Fillmore opened by acknowledging his sudden elevation to the presidency, calling it "a painful dispensation of Divine Providence," and expressed reverence for the Constitution as his guide in all decisions. He emphasized the equal rights of nations, declaring the U.S. stance of strict neutrality, particularly in European conflicts, and asserted the country's right to pursue peaceful relations with all nations.

Internally, Fillmore supported the recently passed Compromise of 1850, describing it as a necessary settlement to maintain unity amidst sectional tensions. He encouraged adherence to the compromise, which included the Fugitive Slave Act, and urged all Americans to maintain peace and stability.

Fillmore also outlined foreign policy objectives, such as the support of an interoceanic canal in Central America. He highlighted a recent treaty with Great Britain, which promoted cooperation on the canal and the preservation of Nicaraguan sovereignty. Furthermore, he recommended the establishment of a mint in California to support its rapid economic development following the Gold Rush.

The address called for legislation to enhance American infrastructure, including coastal defenses and internal improvements, such as railroads. Fillmore advised that tariffs be carefully adjusted to support domestic industries without excluding foreign competition, reflecting a balanced approach to economic policy.

Fillmore concluded by invoking national unity and gratitude for the country's prosperity, urging citizens to support the Constitution and ensure the country's "peace and quiet." His appeal to unity underscored his desire to alleviate the divisive tensions brewing over slavery and expansion in the United States.

Preceded by 1849 State of the Union Address	State of the Union addresses 1850	Succeeded by 1851 State of the Union Address
