= 1846 State of the Union Address =

Speech by US President James K. Polk

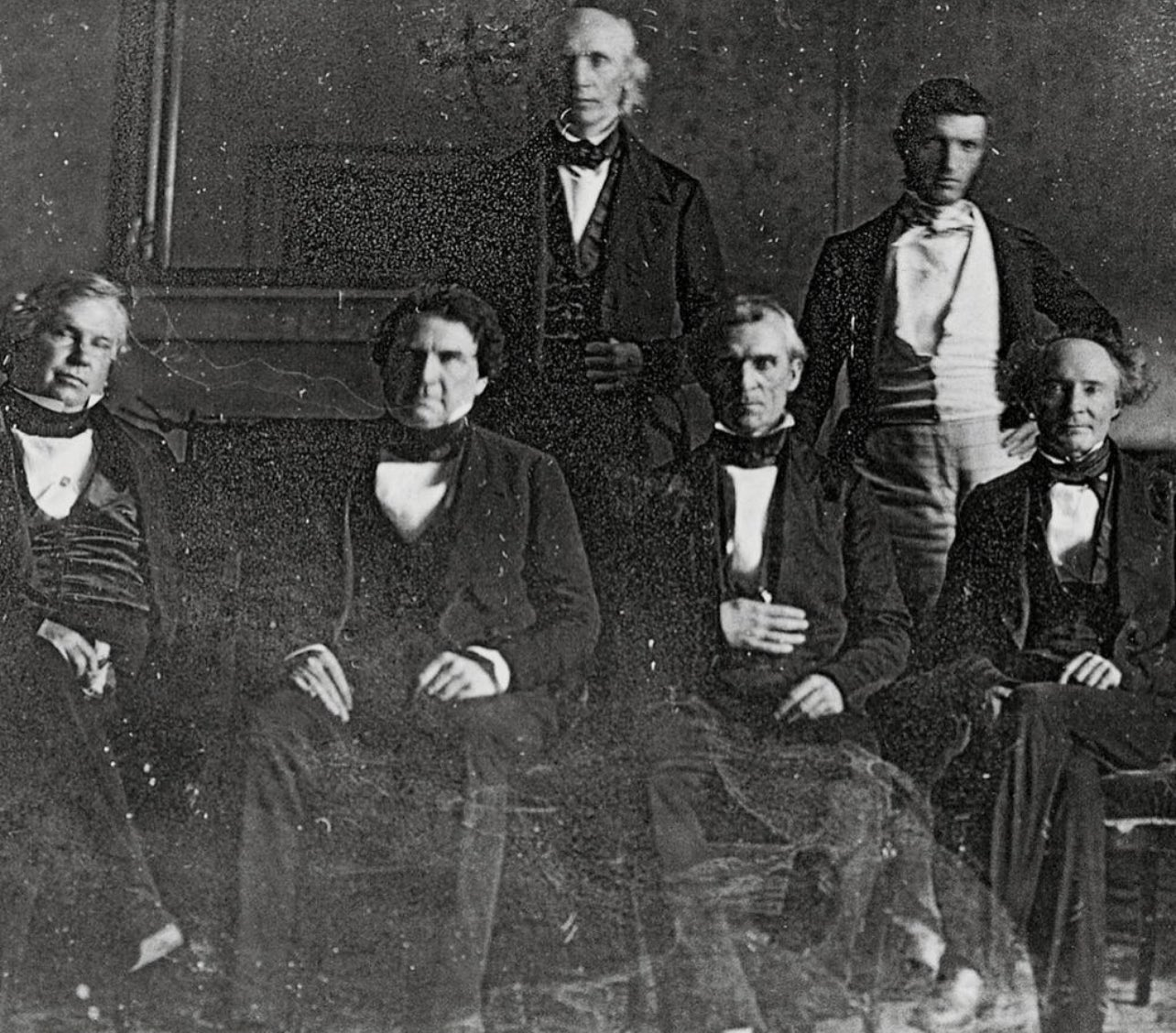
- James K. Polk and his cabinet in the White House Dining Room
- Date: December 8, 1846
- Venue: House Chamber, United States Capitol
- Location: Washington, D.C.; 38°53′23″N 77°00′32″W
- Type: State of the Union Address
- Participants: James K. Polk; George M. Dallas; John Wesley Davis
- Format: Written
- Previous: 1845 State of the Union Address
- Next: 1847 State of the Union Address

The 1846 State of the Union Address was presented to the 29th United States Congress, containing both the United States Senate and United States House of Representatives on Tuesday, December 8, 1846. It was the 56th address given. President James K. Polk, the 11th president, had written it. It was written during the Mexican–American War, and addresses it. "The existing war with Mexico was neither desired nor provoked by the United States."

A large portion of the address concerns the events and views of the President surrounding the Mexican-American War, including the Presidents affirmation that Texas was a free and sovereign state.

On the matter of Native Americans, the President said the following:

Our relations with the various Indian tribes continue to be of a pacific character. The unhappy dissensions which have existed among the Cherokees for many years past have been healed. Since my last annual message important treaties have been negotiated with some of the tribes, by which the Indian title to large tracts of valuable land within the limits of the States and Territories has been extinguished and arrangements made for removing them to the country west of the Mississippi. Between 3,000 and 4,000 of different tribes have been removed to the country provided for them by treaty stipulations, and arrangements have been made for others to follow.

== See also ==
- Bibliography of James K. Polk

Preceded by 1845 State of the Union Address	State of the Union addresses 1846	Succeeded by 1847 State of the Union Address
