= Fred Bowerbank =

Physician and medical officer (1880–1960)

Major-General Sir Fred Thompson Bowerbank KBE
- Born: 30 April 1880; Penrith, Cumberland, England
- Died: 25 August 1960 (aged 80); Wellington, New Zealand
- Education: University of Edinburgh
- Military career
- Allegiance: United Kingdom
- Branch: British Army

Major General Sir Fred Thompson Bowerbank KBE KStJ ED (30 April 1880 – 25 August 1960) was Director-General of Medical Services for the New Zealand Army and Air Force between 1939 and 1947. He served as Honorary Physician to the Governor-General of New Zealand from 1935 to 1939, and as Honorary Physician to King George VI between 1940 and 1948.

Bowerbank was made KBE in 1946, and in the same year a Grand Officer in the Order of Orange-Nassau for his service to the Netherlands during World War II. For his services to first-aid organizations, he was made a Knight of Grace of the Venerable Order of St. John of Jerusalem.

== Life ==
Fred Thompson Bowerbank was born in Penrith, Cumberland, the son of Joseph Bowerbank and his wife Mary (née Farrer). He was educated at Penrith High School and the University of Edinburgh where he graduated M.B. and Ch.B. in 1904. In 1907 he emigrated to New Zealand with his young wife.

At the outbreak of World War I, Bowerbank enlisted in the New Zealand Expeditionary Force. He served in the 1st New Zealand Expeditionary Force and was mentioned five times in dispatches and, for his dedication to service, was made OBE in 1917.

For most of his professional life, Bowerbank was consulting cardiologist to the Wellington Hospital, New Zealand. Bowerbank gained an MD from the University of Edinburgh in 1917, with a thesis on intestinal disease in the New Zealand expeditionary force in Egypt and the Dardanelles. He was elected a Member of the Royal College of Physicians of Edinburgh in 1925 and a Fellow in 1929.

In 1935, he was awarded the King George V Silver Jubilee Medal. He served as Honorary Physician to the Governor-General of New Zealand from 1935 to 1939, and as Honorary Physician to King George VI between 1940 and 1948.

Bowerbank was Chief Medical Officer of the RNZAF from 1937 to 1939 and served as Director-General of Medical Services for the New Zealand Army and Air Force between 1939 and 1947. Bowerbank was made KBE in 1946, and in the same year a Grand Officer in the Order of Orange-Nassau for his service to the Netherlands during World War II. For his services to first-aid organizations, he was made a Knight of Grace of the Venerable Order of St. John of Jerusalem. In 1953, he was awarded the Queen Elizabeth II Coronation Medal.

Bowerbank married Maud Pick in 1907. He died in Wellington, New Zealand, on 25 August 1960. He was the great-uncle of Christopher Bowerbank.

== Publication ==
- A Doctor's Story, by Sir Fred Bowerbank. Published by Harry H. Tombs Limited, The Wingfield Press, Wellington, 1958
