= 1843 State of the Union Address =

Speech by US President John Tyler

- Date: December 5, 1843
- Venue: House Chamber, United States Capitol
- Location: Washington, D.C.; 38°53′23″N 77°00′32″W
- Type: State of the Union Address
- Participants: John Tyler; Willie Person Mangum; John Winston Jones
- Format: Written
- Previous: 1842 State of the Union Address
- Next: 1844 State of the Union Address

The 1843 State of the Union address was delivered by the tenth president of the United States John Tyler to the 28th United States Congress on December 5, 1843. In this address, President Tyler spoke of America's overall prosperity and stability, crediting "the superintendence of an overruling Providence" for guiding the nation through its many trials. Tyler's remarks emphasized the nation's peace, rising trade and commerce, and the abundance of agricultural production in 1843, which together had contributed to economic revival following the financial instability of prior years.

== Foreign relations and Oregon territory dispute ==
A prominent concern was the ongoing dispute with Great Britain over the Oregon Territory. Tyler reiterated that the United States maintained a legitimate claim over the territory up to latitude 54°40′, a claim contested by the British. Tyler urged Congress to establish military outposts along the migration route to the Pacific to ensure protection for American settlers. He affirmed that “new republics” would one day rise on the shores of the Pacific, extending American influence and the principles of civil liberty across the continent.

Tyler also reported progress on maritime disputes involving British seizures of American vessels in African waters, most of which had reached resolution. His administration worked to eliminate such incidents through diplomatic pressure and policy refinements to suppress the atlantic slave trade. Other matters addressed included the United States’ interests in commercial relations with Germany’s Zollverein and the recent relaxation of tobacco and rice duties on American imports, with prospects for further trade negotiations in Europe.

== Texas ==
The address also referenced the controversial annexation of Texas, reflecting growing tensions with Mexico over Texas’s sovereignty. Tyler criticized Mexico’s threats of war over U.S. annexation discussions, asserting that Texas should "be left free to act, especially in regard to her domestic affairs." This foreshadowed the diplomatic conflict that would soon arise as Texas pursued formal union with the United States.

Preceded by 1842 State of the Union Address	State of the Union addresses 1843	Succeeded by 1844 State of the Union Address
