= 1842 State of the Union Address =

Speech by US President John Tyler

- Date: December 6, 1842
- Venue: House Chamber, United States Capitol
- Location: Washington, D.C.; 38°53′23″N 77°00′32″W
- Type: State of the Union Address
- Participants: John Tyler; Willie Person Mangum; John White
- Format: Written
- Previous: 1841 State of the Union Address
- Next: 1843 State of the Union Address

The 1842 State of the Union Address, was written by John Tyler, the tenth president of the United States. It was presented on Tuesday, December 6, 1842, by the Clerk of the United States House of Representatives. He said, "We have continued reason to express our profound gratitude to the Great Creator of All Things for numberless benefits conferred upon us as a people. Blessed with genial seasons, the husbandman has his garners filled with abundance, and the necessaries of life, not to speak of its luxuries, abound in every direction."

Notably, the President mentions the Oregon Territory and that more settlers were being drawn to this land. He urged the settlement of the matter of its ownership at the earliest possible time.

Preceded by 1841 State of the Union Address	State of the Union addresses 1842	Succeeded by 1843 State of the Union Address
