= 1851 State of the Union Address =

Speech by US President Millard Fillmore

- Date: December 2, 1851
- Venue: House Chamber, United States Capitol
- Location: Washington, D.C.; 38°53′23″N 77°00′32″W
- Type: State of the Union Address
- Participants: Millard Fillmore; William R. King; Linn Boyd
- Format: Written
- Previous: 1850 State of the Union Address
- Next: 1852 State of the Union Address

The 1851 State of the Union address was delivered by the 13th president of the United States Millard Fillmore to the United States Congress on December 2, 1851. This address, Fillmore's second annual message to Congress, focused on maintaining neutrality in foreign conflicts, enforcing laws regarding fugitive slaves, and preserving the Union.

== Themes ==
Fillmore opened with a message of national unity and peace, emphasizing that "our country is at peace with all the world," despite recent unrest over sectional issues. He condemned foreign invasions and expeditions organized in the U.S., particularly those targeting Spanish-controlled Cuba. Fillmore reaffirmed that such acts violated U.S. neutrality and the principles of nonintervention, declaring, "No individuals have a right to hazard the peace of the country...to alter governments in other states." He warned that future violations of neutrality would be met with "stern punishment."

Domestically, Fillmore addressed the controversial Fugitive Slave Act of 1850, affirming his commitment to its enforcement, stating, "The act...is as binding as any other" under the Constitution. He condemned mob resistance to fugitive slave arrests, asserting that "the law must be executed," despite growing Northern opposition. Fillmore reminded Congress that the Constitution demanded compliance from all states.

Fillmore also noted progress in infrastructure and territorial development, mentioning efforts to improve the nation's postal system and the construction of a trans-isthmus railroad in Central America. He appealed to Congress to establish consistent agricultural support, including a bureau focused on farming advancements, reflecting his administration's support for agrarian and economic growth.

The 1851 address highlighted Fillmore's dedication to upholding laws, promoting internal improvements, and maintaining peace, both domestically and internationally.

Preceded by 1850 State of the Union Address	State of the Union addresses 1850	Succeeded by 1852 State of the Union Address
