= 1848 State of the Union Address =

Speech by US President James K. Polk

- Date: December 5, 1848
- Venue: House Chamber, United States Capitol
- Location: Washington, D.C.; 38°53′23″N 77°00′32″W
- Type: State of the Union Address
- Participants: James K. Polk; George M. Dallas; Robert C. Winthrop
- Format: Written
- Previous: 1847 State of the Union Address
- Next: 1849 State of the Union Address

The 1848 State of the Union address was delivered by James K. Polk, the 11th president of the United States, to the 30th United States Congress on December 5, 1848. This address highlighted Polk’s vision for America following the recent territorial gains from the Mexican-American War and addressed both domestic policies and international relations in a rapidly expanding nation.

Polk expressed gratitude for “peace, plenty, and contentment” across the nation, affirming the prosperity the United States had achieved while European nations faced instability. Emphasizing the strength of democratic governance, Polk credited the nation's success to “the great republican maxim that the will of the majority, constitutionally expressed, shall prevail.”

The President noted the substantial territorial expansion resulting from the Treaty of Guadalupe Hidalgo, which concluded the Mexican-American War. Polk outlined the economic and strategic value of these new territories, particularly California, with its potential as a major Pacific trade hub. He stated that “Upper California... holds at this day, in point of value and importance, to the rest of the Union the same relation that Louisiana did” when acquired from France, stressing the importance of organizing California and New Mexico under territorial governments.

Another key aspect of Polk’s address was the recent discovery of gold in California. He reported to Congress that recent surveys suggested California’s gold resources “are more extensive and valuable than was anticipated,” foreseeing California’s economic importance and proposing the establishment of a U.S. Mint branch on the Pacific coast to process the gold being mined.

Polk also acknowledged the role of the U.S. military in securing and maintaining these territories, lauding both Army and Navy officers for their service. He emphasized the Navy’s importance, even though it had less engagement during the war, as it secured safe trade routes and supported military efforts along the coasts.

Domestically, Polk reinforced his stance on fiscal prudence and opposed protective tariffs, suggesting that “the revenue duties” under the tariff of 1846 had balanced economic growth and a favorable fiscal position for the United States. Polk urged that government expenditure should be kept “economical” to reduce the public debt and maintain stability.

Polk’s speech, delivered amid a transformative period in U.S. history, reflected his belief in expansionism and manifest destiny, yet warned of the domestic sectional tensions that lay ahead over the future of slavery in these new territories, advocating for non-interference by Congress and leaving the decision to the residents when they formed state constitutions.

== See also ==
- Bibliography of James K. Polk

Preceded by 1847 State of the Union Address	State of the Union addresses 1848	Succeeded by 1849 State of the Union Address
