= 1847 State of the Union Address =

Speech by US President James K. Polk

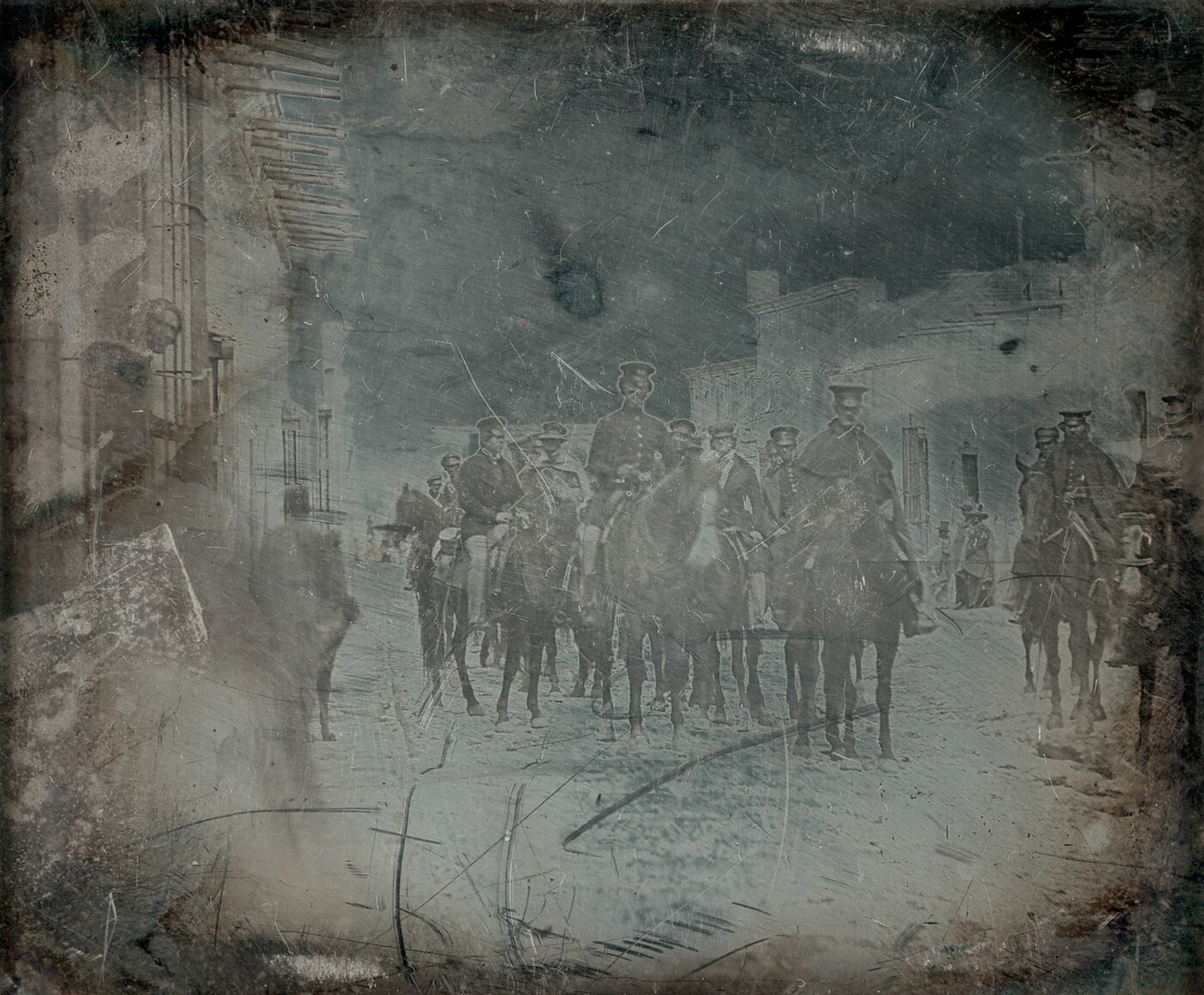
- General John E. Wool and cavalry in Saltillo Mexico (1847), Polk's war was the first to be photographed
- Date: December 7, 1847
- Venue: House Chamber, United States Capitol
- Location: Washington, D.C.; 38°53′23″N 77°00′32″W
- Type: State of the Union Address
- Participants: James K. Polk; George M. Dallas; Robert C. Winthrop
- Format: Written
- Previous: 1846 State of the Union Address
- Next: 1848 State of the Union Address

The 1847 State of the Union Address was delivered by the 11th president of the United States James K. Polk to the 30th United States Congress on December 7, 1847. President Polk addressed issues of national prosperity, the ongoing Mexican-American War, and the growth of American territorial interests.

Highlighting the nation's prosperity, Polk noted, "There has been no period since the Government was founded when all the industrial pursuits of our people have been more successful or when labor...has received a fairer or better reward." He celebrated the nation's strength, linking its industrial success to the increased freedoms and rights upheld by a democratic government, and lauded the self-governance achieved since the nation's founding nearly seventy years earlier.

The Mexican-American War was a central focus of the address. Polk detailed the events leading to war, emphasizing that "the United States were the aggrieved nation" forced into conflict after Mexico's refusal to negotiate. He justified the need for territorial indemnity, stressing that the United States sought compensation for the costs of war and reparations for longstanding grievances with Mexico, as well as the establishment of secure borders along the Rio Grande.

Polk also addressed concerns over territorial expansion, particularly the acquisition of New Mexico and California. He argued that Mexico could neither govern nor defend these distant regions effectively and claimed they were “naturally connected” to the U.S. He anticipated that under American governance, these territories would develop rapidly, providing secure access to the Pacific and offering new commercial opportunities with East Asia.

Citing the need for improved governance in the recently acquired Oregon Territory, Polk proposed the establishment of a territorial government and encouraged settlement, recommending land grants as incentives to pioneers moving westward. He also reaffirmed America's commitment to westward expansion, framing it as vital for both economic growth and national security.

Polk concluded with an appeal to the unity and patriotism of Congress, invoking George Washington’s Farewell Address to remind his audience of the dangers of regional divisions, saying, “It is of infinite moment that you should properly estimate the immense value of your national union to your collective and individual happiness.”

== See also ==
- Bibliography of James K. Polk

Preceded by 1846 State of the Union Address	State of the Union addresses 1847	Succeeded by 1848 State of the Union Address
