= 1844 State of the Union Address =

Speech by US President John Tyler

- Date: December 3, 1844
- Venue: House Chamber, United States Capitol
- Location: Washington, D.C.; 38°53′23″N 77°00′32″W
- Type: State of the Union Address
- Participants: John Tyler; Willie Person Mangum; John W. Jones
- Format: Written
- Previous: 1843 State of the Union Address
- Next: 1845 State of the Union Address

The 1844 State of the Union address was delivered by the tenth president of the United States John Tyler on December 3, 1844, to the 28th United States Congress.

== Themes ==
Tyler used the address to reflect on the growth and stability of the nation, celebrating the recent peaceful presidential election, which demonstrated the power of the American democratic process to settle leadership peacefully and without external intervention. He remarked on the strength of a union composed of diverse states with local independence but united for national interests, a model of "political confederation" that provided enduring stability.

A central issue in Tyler's message was the impending Annexation of Texas. Tyler defended the controversial decision to pursue annexation despite Mexico’s opposition, underscoring the cultural and economic compatibility of Texas with the United States and arguing that it was in Texas’s best interest to consolidate peace and security by joining the Union. Tyler warned against "foreign intrigue" that might seek to exploit divisions in American states, reiterating the need for a unified stance on annexation.

Tyler also urged Congress to address the ongoing dispute with Great Britain over the Oregon Territory. Citing British protections for settlers, he called for military outposts along American emigrant routes to safeguard travelers and settlers against attacks, thus strengthening American presence in Oregon.

Further, he highlighted the improved state of the nation's finances, noting that Treasury receipts exceeded expenses, enabling debt reduction without further loans. He attributed economic recovery to "prudent fiscal management" and asserted that the American financial system, under careful regulation, could sustain national prosperity independently, even during financial crises.

Preceded by 1843 State of the Union Address	State of the Union addresses 1844	Succeeded by 1845 State of the Union Address
