= 1841 State of the Union Address =

Speech by US President John Tyler

- Date: December 7, 1841
- Venue: House Chamber, United States Capitol
- Location: Washington, D.C.; 38°53′23″N 77°00′32″W
- Type: State of the Union Address
- Participants: John Tyler; Samuel L. Southard; John White
- Format: Written
- Previous: 1840 State of the Union Address
- Next: 1842 State of the Union Address

The 1841 State of the Union address was delivered by the tenth president of the United States John Tyler on December 7, 1841, before the 27th United States Congress.

== Themes ==
President Tyler began by expressing gratitude for the nation's prosperity, crediting the “protection and merciful dispensations of Divine Providence.” He highlighted the ongoing peace in the United States and praised advancements in education and social happiness, while also addressing some pressing issues regarding the nation's relationship with Great Britain and internal fiscal policy.

Tyler noted the recent acquittal of Alexander McLeod, a British subject involved in the 1837 Caroline affair who had been arrested for murder after an attack on the steamboat Caroline on American soil. Tyler stated, "The manner in which the issue was tried will satisfy the English Government that the principles of justice will never fail to govern the enlightened decision of an American tribunal," emphasizing the need to balance the integrity of state and federal jurisdictions with international obligations.

Additionally, Tyler addressed the rising tensions from Britain's assertion of its right to search American ships suspected of participating in the slave trade in the African seas. He argued that "American citizens prosecuting a lawful commerce in the African seas under the flag of their country are not responsible for the abuse or unlawful use of that flag by others." Tyler called for congressional action to ensure American vessels were not subjected to search without consent, asserting that American sovereignty and neutral commerce rights must be protected.

Domestic economic policy was another focus, with Tyler noting the national debt and emphasizing a prudent fiscal strategy, stating, “Wealth can only be accumulated by the earnings of industry and the savings of frugality.” He called on Congress to uphold "a rigid standard of economy" while rejecting proposals for further bank incorporations and challenging Congress to protect government funds from dependency on state banking corporations.

Tyler further recommended military upgrades for better frontier defense and proposed a chain of military posts across the western territories to protect settlers and facilitate communications between the Mississippi River and the Pacific Ocean. He also noted advances in the sixth national census, which reported a population of 17,069,453, reflecting a growth rate of over 32% since the previous decade.
