= 1849 State of the Union Address =

Speech by US President Zachary Taylor

- Date: December 4, 1849
- Venue: House Chamber, United States Capitol
- Location: Washington, D.C.; 38°53′23″N 77°00′32″W
- Type: State of the Union Address
- Participants: Zachary Taylor; Millard Fillmore; Howell Cobb
- Format: Written
- Previous: 1848 State of the Union Address
- Next: 1850 State of the Union Address

The 1849 State of the Union Address was delivered by the 12th president of the United States Zachary Taylor to the 31st United States Congress on December 4, 1849. Presiding over this joint session was Howell Cobb, the House Speaker, with Millard Fillmore, the vice president, in his role as President of the Senate.

In this address, Taylor reflected on the United States' stability and growing influence in international relations. He remarked, "The United States of America at this moment present to the world the most stable and permanent Government on earth," crediting the nation's resilience to the foundations laid by preceding generations.

Taylor emphasized peace with foreign nations, noting the United States' commitment to neutrality despite ongoing conflicts in Europe. He declared, "We have been able to maintain amidst all these contests an independent and neutral position," indicating a preference for avoiding entanglement in European affairs.

The address also outlined critical issues at home, including expanding territories and relations with Mexico. Taylor supported California's imminent request for statehood and called for Congress to consider the political futures of California and New Mexico, territories acquired under the Treaty of Guadalupe Hidalgo. He advised against introducing sectional issues that could lead to division, recalling the Founding Fathers' warnings.

Taylor further addressed infrastructure and commerce, advocating for government support in developing transportation routes, including a possible transcontinental railroad. This infrastructure was critical for connecting the growing territories in the West with the rest of the Union.

In his message, Taylor acknowledged the need for vigilance in defending the Union, describing it as "the proudest monument" of the American people and expressing his dedication to its preservation. His appeal was directed at sustaining national unity in a period marked by the divisive issues of expansion and slavery.

Preceded by 1848 State of the Union Address	State of the Union addresses 1849	Succeeded by 1850 State of the Union Address
