= Christopher Bowerbank =

English architect and raconteur (1940–2002)

- Born: 17 November 1940; Biddestone, Wiltshire, England
- Died: 25 April 2002 (aged 61); Notting Hill, London, England
- Education: Sherborne School; Architectural Association School of Architecture
- Relatives: Great uncle: Sir Fred Thompson Bowerbank

Christopher William Bowerbank (17 November 1940 – 25 April 2002) was an English architect and raconteur. Bowerbank's obituary in The Daily Telegraph described him as a ‘celebrated member of West London society and one of the best conversationalists of his generation’. Will Self recalled that Bowerbank had the ability to transition between the "haut, beau and demi-mondes". In his later years Bowerbank was said to resemble Beethoven.

In his early years as an architect, Bowerbank lived in Camden in the same house as Bruce Robinson, the film producer. Bowerbank's Jaguar was said to be the inspiration behind the mode of transport to Penrith in Robinson's cult classic film Withnail and I.

At the time of Bowerbank's death he was engaged to Emma Soames, the editor of The Daily Telegraph magazine and granddaughter of Winston Churchill. According to his obituary in The Daily Telegraph, Bowerbank 'talked to everyone with the same charm and vigorous attack – whether it was Princess Margaret or the locals on his beloved Orkney island of Rousay, where he had a home for more than 25 years’.

== Early life ==
Christopher William Bowerbank was born on 17 November 1940 in Biddestone, Wiltshire. He was the son of a Royal Navy Commander, Geoffrey Bowerbank, and Mary Winifred Bowerbank (née Kirtley), and educated at Sherborne School where he shared a study with Nigel Dempster. Bowerbank matriculated at the Architectural Association School of Architecture, graduating with a first, and afterwards turned down two scholarship offers to study English at Columbia University, New York. Sir Peter Cook was influential on Bowerbank's architectural style.

== Architectural career ==
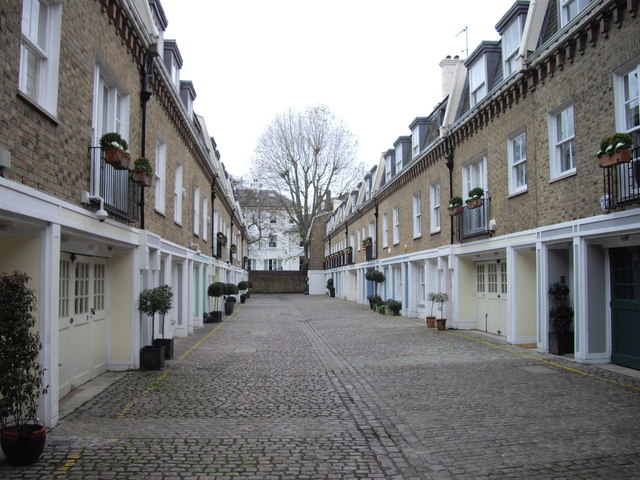
Redcliffe Mews, largely designed by Christopher Bowerbank

After the AA, Bowerbank attempted a series of apprenticeships which were not to his liking. He temporarily and characteristically ended up an escort and driver to Marianne Faithfull through whom he gained a commission to design the headquarters of Impact Records, then the record label of The Rolling Stones. The headquarters were never constructed but the experience set up Bowerbank as an independent architect for the rest of his professional life.

Bowerbank built his practice in London's Fitzrovia, behind Bertorelli's Restaurant on Charlotte Street. He was never a modernist in architectural style: when asked to extend or modify an old building, he would not seek to detract from the original, reflecting his respect for British style and tradition. Bowerbank worked on both residential and commercial buildings and he was noted for his sympathetic restoration of listed buildings, particularly in London. His work often required complex negotiations with English Heritage and council planners.

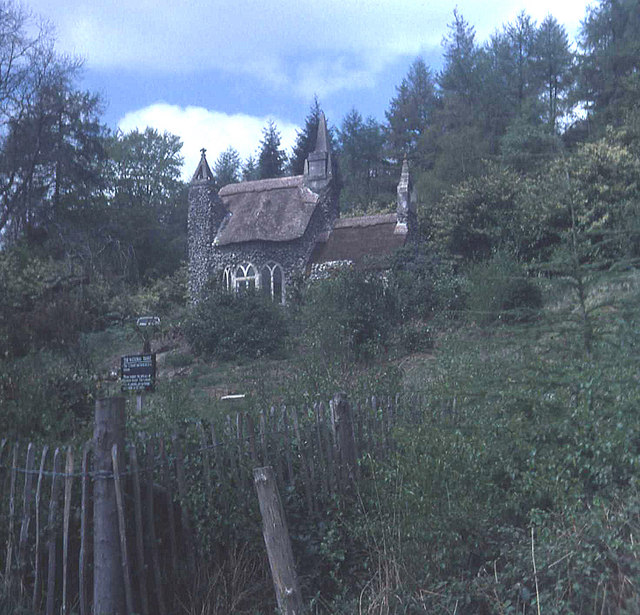
The Convent, Stourhead, before its restoration by Bowerbank

Bowerbank's work included the headquarters for Radiodetection in Bristol, work on Redcliffe Mews in London and Howabreck House on Orkney. In 1990, he won an English Heritage award for his renovation work on The Convent in Stourhead, Wiltshire, which was Grade I listed.

== Personal life ==
From an early age, Bowerbank was an amateur ornithologist. He rarely talked about his professional work, preferring instead to talk about literature, philosophy and the European Union, the latter being a subject on which he was a firm critic. At the time of Bowerbank's death he was engaged to Emma Soames, granddaughter of Winston Churchill and then the editor of The Daily Telegraph magazine.

Bowerbank's great uncle was Sir Fred Thompson Bowerbank, Hon. Physician to King George VI. For 25 years, Bowerbank had a home on the island of Orkney, Viera Lodge, where he entertained friends from London and engaged in his love of ornithology.

Bowerbank died in his sleep in Notting Hill on 25 April 2002, aged 61.
