= Horseshoe Reef Lighthouse =

- Location: United States
- Coordinates: 42.88135°N 78.91512°W

Tower
- Constructed: 1859–1860

Light
- First lit: 1 September 1856
- Deactivated: 1919 or in 1920
- Lens: Fresnel lens

The Horseshoe Reef Lighthouse is a dilapidated lighthouse in Lake Erie between New York State and Canada near Buffalo, New York and at the head of the Niagara River, which empties Lake Erie into Lake Ontario.

The United Kingdom ceded one acre of territory surrounding Horseshoe Reef, an underwater hazard, to the United States on December 9, 1850. As such, the lighthouse played a minor role in the territorial evolution of the United States, as it was an enclave on the Canadian side of the water border. On March 3, 1851 the US Congress allocated funding to build a lighthouse there, a contingency agreed upon for the transfer of the land. Construction was problematic but first light was finally achieved on September 1, 1856 using a Fresnel lens.

Operation ceased on August 1, 1919 or in 1920 and the lighthouse has been so far simply left to the elements and most of the house has rotted away. A 1908 treaty shifted the border in Lake Erie slightly to place the lighthouse on the U.S. side.

The lighthouse is on the "Doomsday List" of the Lighthouse Digest magazine.

At present, the remains of the lighthouse serve as a habitat for cormorants.
