= Hodgson v. Bowerbank =

Hodgson and Thompson v. Bowerbank
- Supreme Court of the United States

Decided February 10, 1810
- Full case name: Hodgson and Thompson v. Bowerbank and Others
- Citations: 9 U.S. 303 (more) 5 Cranch 303; 3 L. Ed. 108; 1809 U.S. LEXIS 437

Court membership
- Chief Justice John Marshall Associate Justices William Cushing · Samuel Chase; Bushrod Washington · William Johnson; H. Brockholst Livingston · Thomas Todd

Case opinion
- Majority: Marshall, joined by unanimous

Hodgson and Thompson v. Bowerbank, 9 U.S. (5 Cranch) 303 (1809), was a United States Supreme Court case that held part of the Judiciary Act of 1789 unconstitutional. The invalidated portion conferred federal courts jurisdiction to try cases between aliens.
