= Inauguration of James K. Polk =

15th United States presidential inauguration

Presidential inauguration of James K. Polk
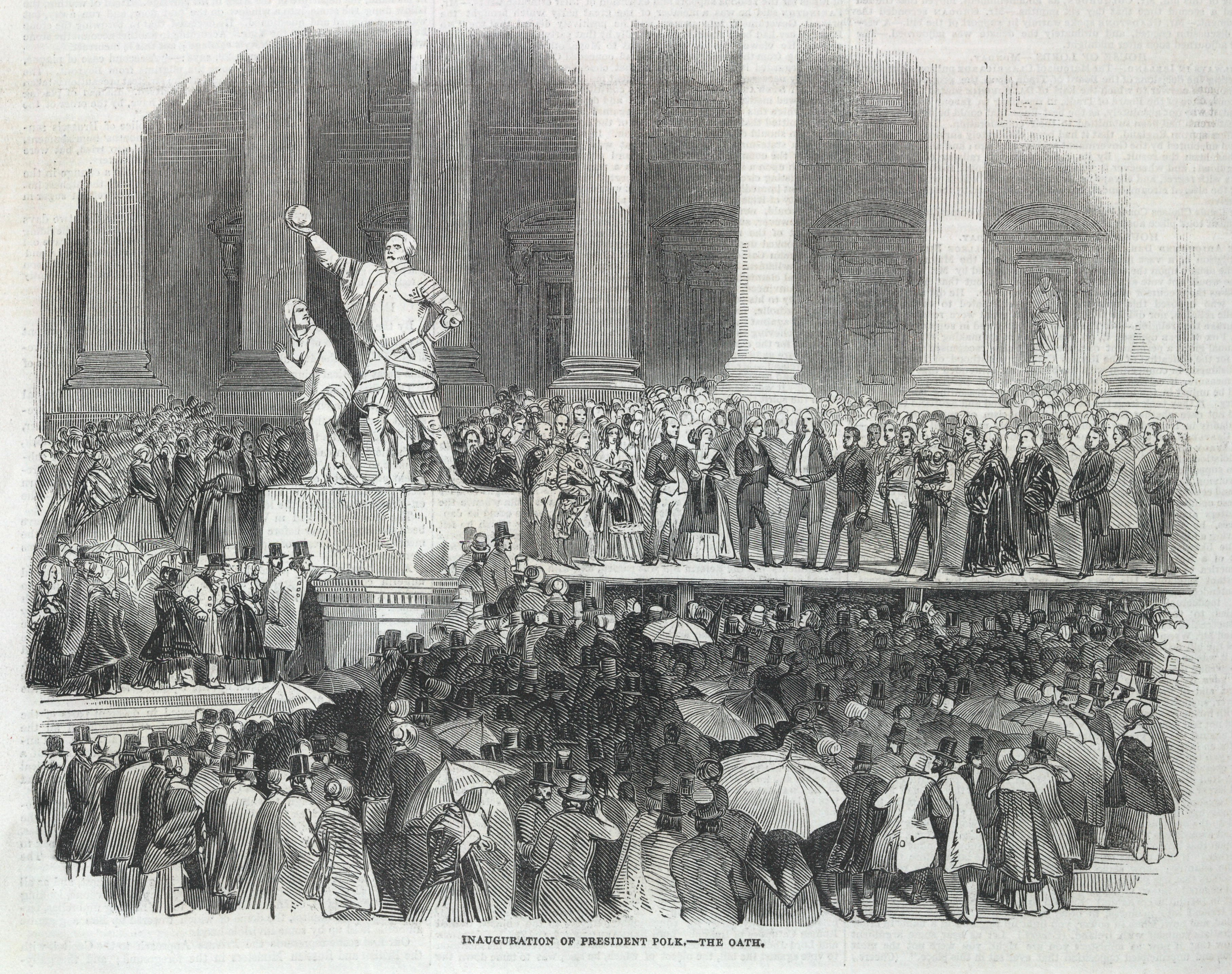
- Sketch of ceremony in The Illustrated London News.
- Date: March 4, 1845; 181 years ago
- Location: United States Capitol, Washington, D.C.
- Participants: James K. Polk; 11th president of the United States — Assuming office Roger Taney; Chief Justice of the United States — Administering oath George M. Dallas; 11th vice president of the United States — Assuming office Willie Person Mangum; President pro tempore of the United States Senate — Administering oath

The inauguration of James K. Polk as the 11th president of the United States took place on Tuesday, March 4, 1845, at the East Portico of the United States Capitol in Washington, D.C.

Polk began his journey to the nation’s capital in late January from his home state of Tennessee. Along the way he stopped at The Hermitage for what was to be the final visit with former President Jackson before he died later that year. No account exists of what was discussed at the meeting, however Polk was widely seen as Jackson’s political heir and was nicknamed “Young Hickory”. His administration would go on to add the most territory for the United States as Polk aggressively pursued the Manifest Destiny policies of the Jacksonian era.

This was the 15th inauguration and marked the commencement of the only four-year term of both James K. Polk as president and George M. Dallas as vice president. Polk was sworn in by Chief Justice Roger B. Taney. This was the first inaugural ceremony to be reported by telegraph and to be shown in a newspaper illustration; it appeared in The Illustrated London News.

Polk Inaugural Address

Our people, increasing to many millions, have filled the eastern valley of the Mississippi, adventurously ascended the Missouri to its headsprings, and are already engaged in establishing the blessings of self-government in valleys of which the rivers flow to the Pacific. The world beholds the peaceful triumphs of the industry of our emigrants. To us belongs the duty of protecting them adequately wherever they may be upon our soil. The jurisdiction of our laws and the benefits of our republican institutions should be extended over them in the distant regions which they have selected for their homes.

— James K. Polk, Inaugural Address (March 4, 1845)

== Gallery ==
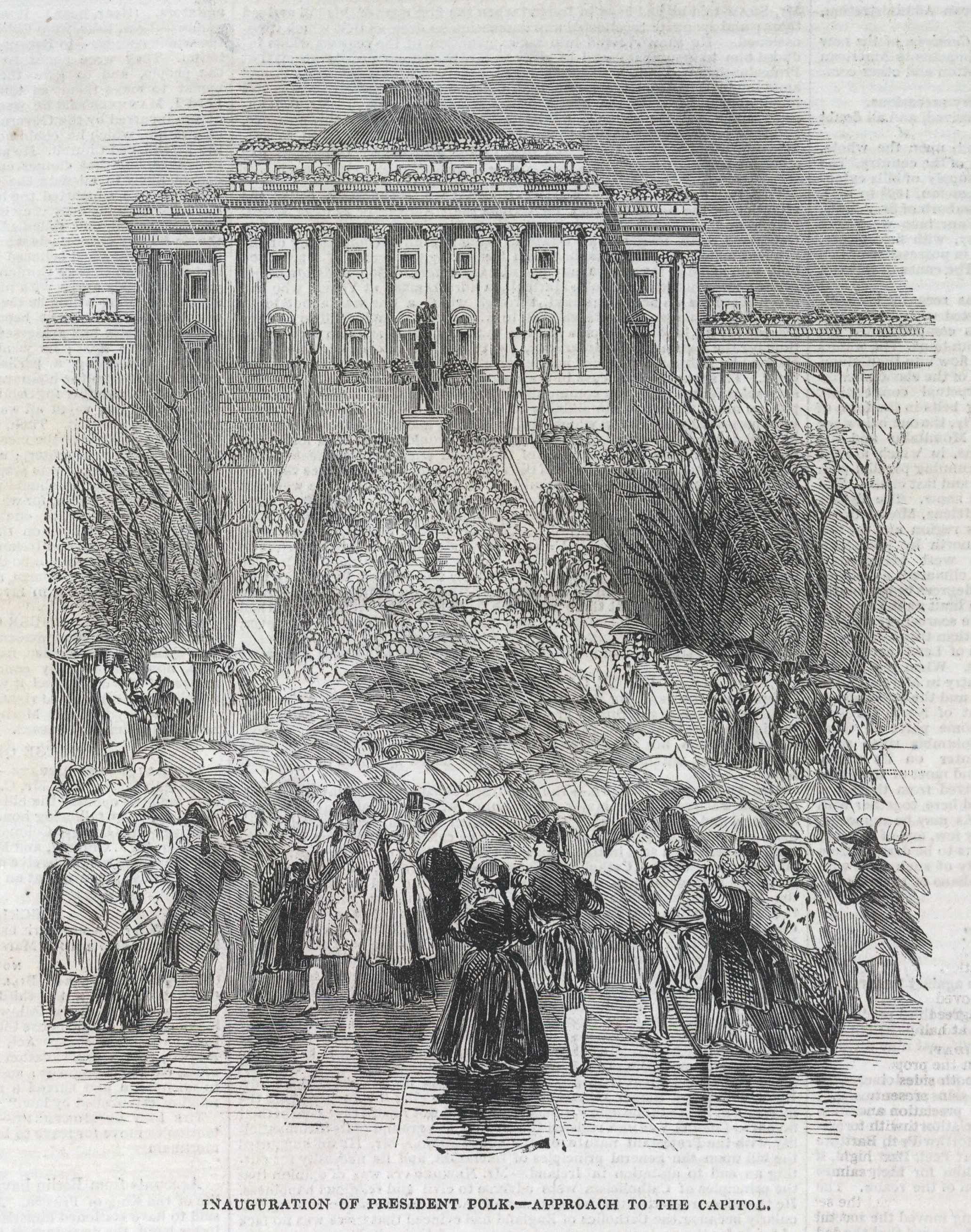
Polk inauguration Approach London News

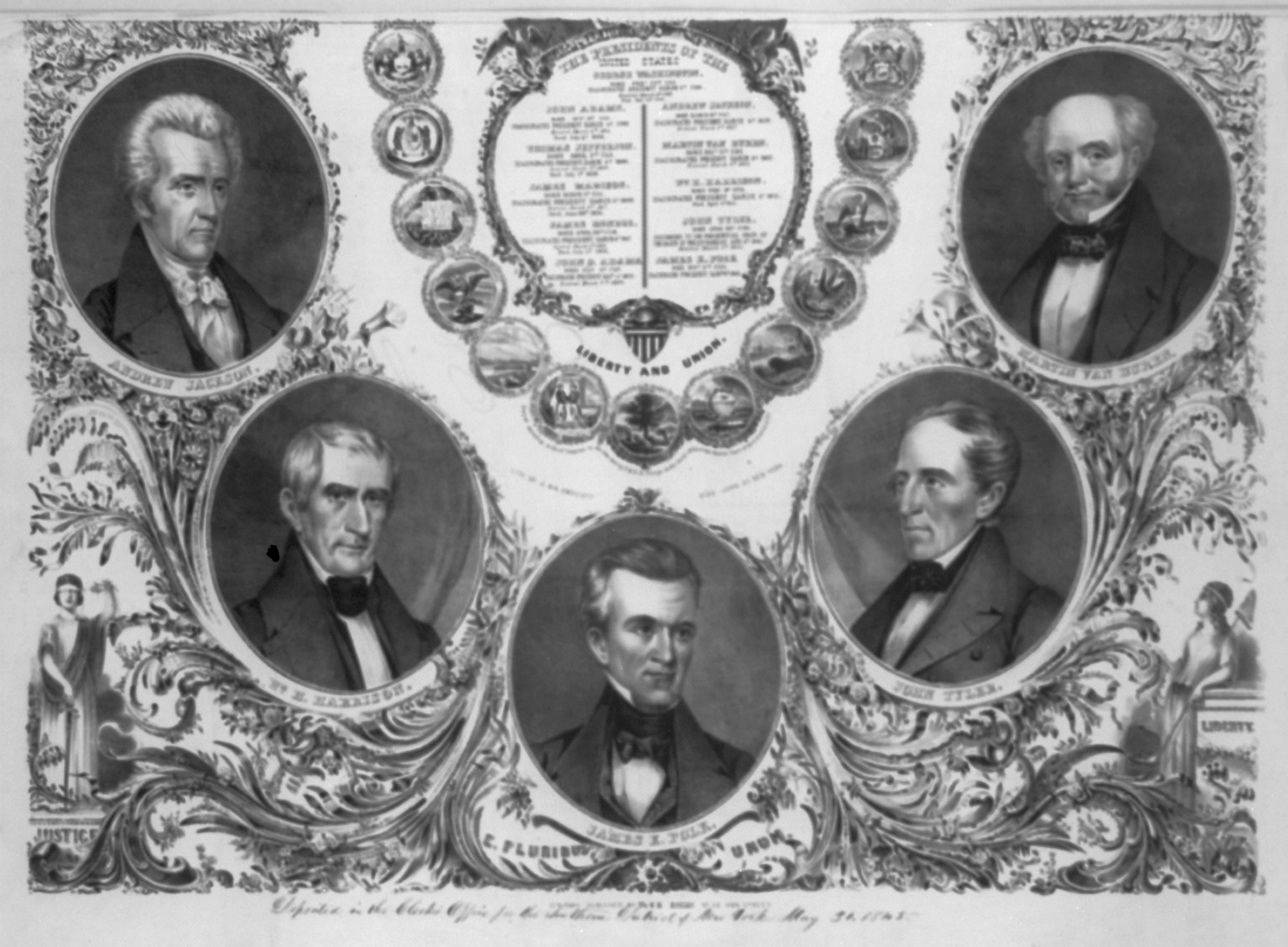
A commemorative print published after the inauguration of President James K. Polk. The design incorporates oval bust portraits of the eleven Presidents arranged in an oval with Washington in the center and Polk at the bottom

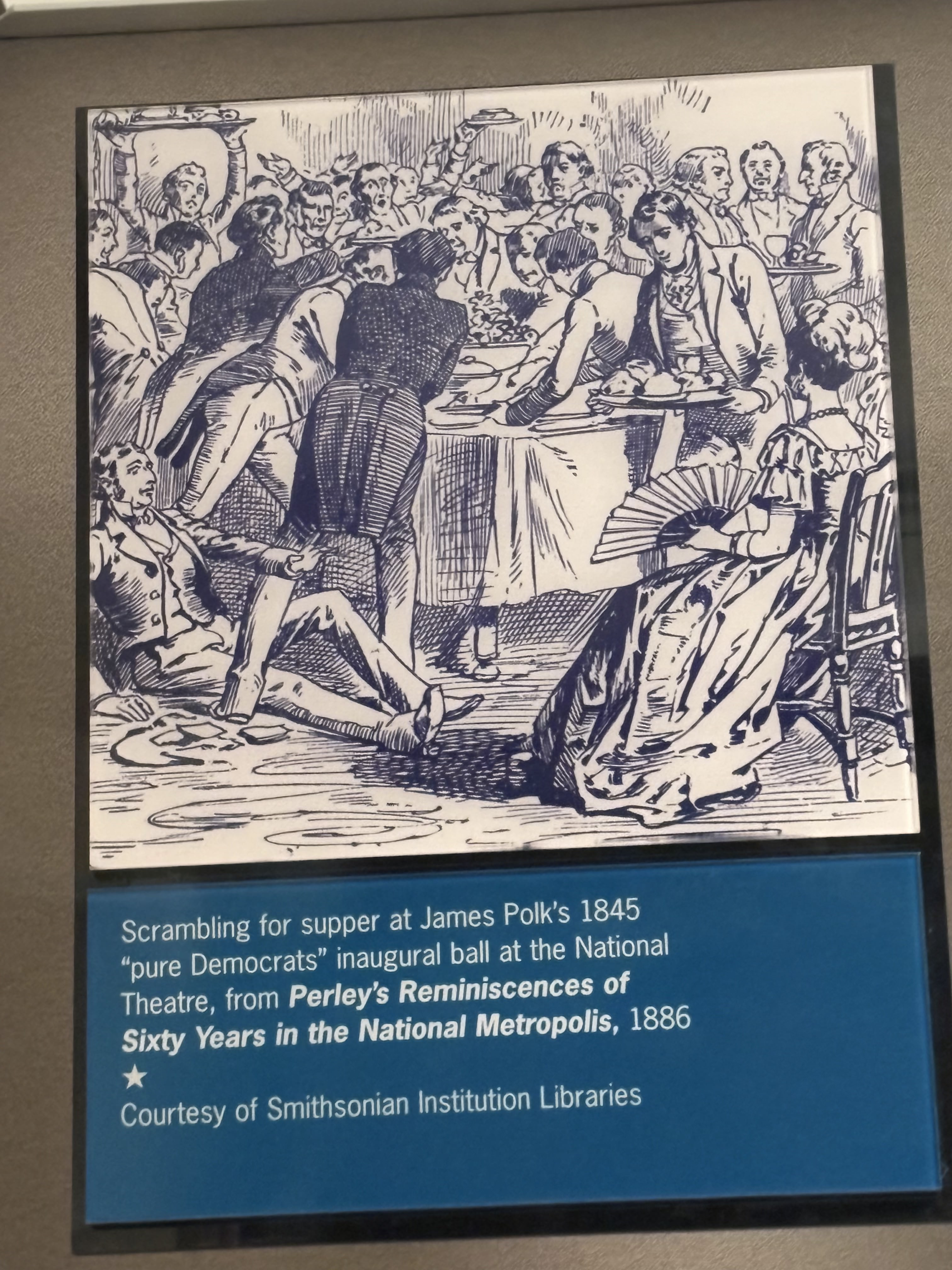
James Polk's 1845 "pure Democrats" inaugural ball at the National Theatre, from Perley's Reminiscences of Sixty Years in the National Metropolis, 1886

== See also ==
- Presidency of James K. Polk
- 1844 United States presidential election
