= Timeline of the James Monroe presidency =

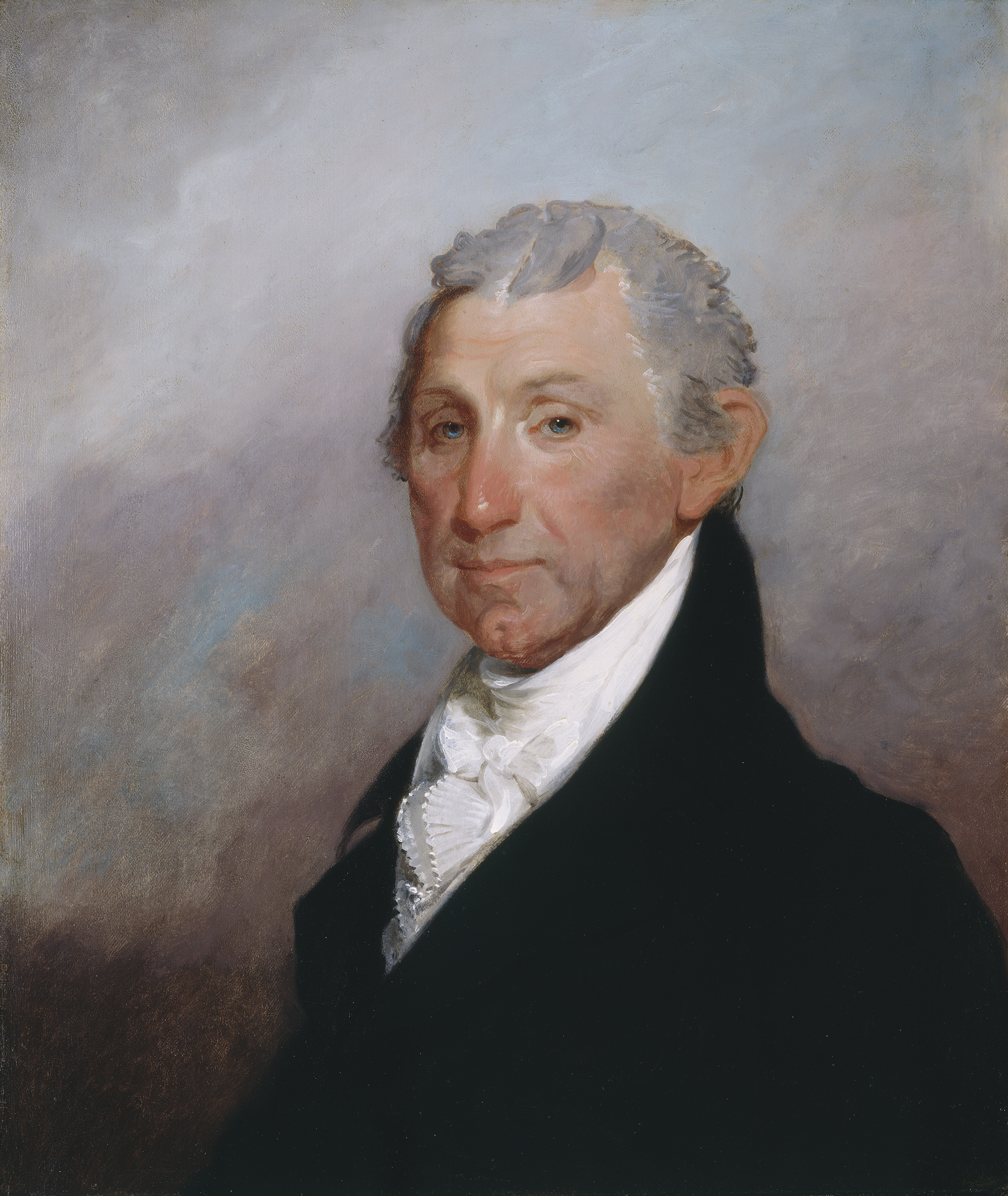
James Monroe c. 1817

The presidency of James Monroe began on March 4, 1817, when James Monroe was inaugurated as the fifth president of the United States, and ended on March 4, 1825, after two terms.

== 1817 ==
=== March 1817 ===
- March 4 – James Monroe is inaugurated as the fifth president of the United States. He retains William H. Crawford as secretary of the treasury, Richard Rush as attorney general, Return J. Meigs Jr. as postmaster general, and Benjamin Williams Crowninshield as secretary of the navy.
- March 5 – Monroe nominates Benjamin Parke to the United States District Court for the District of Indiana.
- March 10 – Attorney general Richard Rush takes the additional role of acting secretary of state.
- March 30 – The United States signs a treaty with the Menominee.

=== April 1817 ===
- April 29
  - Monroe signs the Rush–Bagot Treaty, an agreement with the United Kingdom to disarm in the Great Lakes that was originally negotiated by Monroe was he was secretary of state.
  - Jonathan Russell becomes the first US minister to Sweden.

=== May 1817 ===
- May 14 – John Quincy Adams becomes minister to the United Kingdom.

=== June 1817 ===
- June 1 – Monroe departs for a tour of New England to build relations with local politicians and members of the Federalist Party. This is recognized as the beginning of the Era of Good Feelings, a period of minimal political conflict within the United States.
- June 24 – The United States signs a treaty with the Otoe.
- June 25 – The United States signs a treaty with the Ponca.

=== July 1817 ===
- July 8 – The United States signs a treaty with the Cherokee.

=== August 1817 ===
- August 24 – An American delegation departs for South America.

=== September 1817 ===
- September 17 – Monroe's tour of New England ends.
- September 22 – John Quincy Adams becomes secretary of state.
- September 29 – The United States signs a treaty with the Chippewa, Delaware, Ottawa, Potawatomi, Seneca, and Shawnee.

=== October 1817 ===
- October 30 – Richard Rush ends his tenure as attorney general.

=== November 1817 ===
- November 15 – William Wirt succeeds Richard Rush as attorney general.
- November 21 – The United States initiates a policy of pursuing runaway slaves hiding among the Seminole people. This begins the First Seminole War.

=== December 1817 ===
- December 1
  - The 15th United States Congress opens its first session.
  - Monroe declares that the United States is neutral on the independence movement of Latin American territories.
- December 2 – Monroe delivers the 1817 State of the Union Address.
- December 10
  - Mississippi is admitted to the United States as the twentieth state.
  - John C. Calhoun becomes secretary of war.
- December 23 – Monroe signs a bill repealing the taxes of 1813.
- December 26 – General Andrew Jackson is authorized to combat the Seminole in Florida and Georgia.

== 1818 ==
=== January 1818 ===
- January 13 – Monroe announces the capture of Amelia Island from Spanish Florida, stating that Spain was unable to address a local piracy problem.
- January 22 – The United States signs a treaty with the Creek.
- January 27 – Monroe nominates Albion Parris to the United States District Court for the District of Maine.

=== February 1818 ===
- February 12 – Richard Rush becomes minister to the United Kingdom.
- February 14 – William Pinkney ends his tenure as minister to Russia.

=== March 1818 ===
- March – Andrew Jackson begins launching attacks against Spanish Florida to prevent them from helping the Seminole.
- March 6 – Andrew Jackson captures the fort at St. Marks, Florida.
- March 18 – The Military Pension Act of 1818 grants a military pension for veterans of the American Revolutionary War.
- March 27 – Monroe signs a resolution authorizing the public release of journals and proceedings from the Constitutional Convention.

=== April 1818 ===
- April 4 – The Flag Act of 1818 sets into law that the flag of the United States is to have 13 stripes and one star for each state.
- April 16 – The Senate ratifies the Rush-Bagot Agreement.
- April 18
  - Illinois is authorized to create a constitution in anticipation of statehood.
  - The Navigation Act of 1818 bans the entry of ships from any British territory where American ships are banned.
- April 20
  - Monroe nominates William Bayard Shields to the United States District Court for the District of Mississippi and Jonathan Hoge Walker to the United States District Court for the Western District of Pennsylvania.
  - The 15th United States Congress adjourns its first session.
- April 29 – Andrew Jackson authorizes the execution of two British citizens after they are convicted of assisting the Seminole in the First Seminole War.

=== May 1818 ===
- May 5 – William Eustis ends his tenure as minister to the Netherlands.
- May 24 – Andrew Jackson attacks Pensacola in Spanish Florida. This is recognized as an act of war against Spain.
- May 27 – Monroe signs a treaty of commerce between the United States and Sweden following its ratification in February 1817.
- May 28 – Monroe begins a tour of Maryland, Virginia, and North Carolina.

=== June 1818 ===
- June 18
  - Monroe learns of and condemns Andrew Jackson's attacks against Spanish Florida. He ends his tour of Maryland, Virginia, and North Carolina early.
  - The United States signs the Treaty of St. Louis with the Pawnee. Additional Pawnee groups are added over the following days.

=== July 1818 ===
- July
  - Negotiations begin to sell Spanish Florida to the United States.
  - The delegation to South America returns to the United States.

=== August 1818 ===
- August 24 – The United States signs a treaty with the Quapaw.

=== September 1818 ===
- September 17 – The United States signs the Treaty of St. Mary's with several Native American tribes.
- September 25
  - The treaty of commerce between Sweden and the United States enters into force.
  - The United States signs a treaty with the Illinois Confederation.
  - The United States signs a treaty with the Osage Nation.

=== October 1818 ===
- October 19 – The United States signs a treaty with the Chickasaw.
- October 20
  - The United States and the United Kingdom sign the Treaty of 1818 to resolve disputes that arose from the War of 1812, including the border of the Louisiana Territory and fishing rights off Newfoundland.
  - The Rush-Bagot Treaty is signed.
- October 22 – Jonathan Russell ends his tenure as minister to Sweden.

=== November 1818 ===
- November 9 – Monroe appoints Smith Thompson as secretary of the navy.
- November 16
  - The 15th United States Congress opens its second session.
  - Monroe delivers the 1818 State of the Union Address.

=== December 1818 ===
- December 3 – Illinois is admitted to the United States as the twenty-first state.
- December 21 – A 1818 settlement treaty between Spain and the United States comes into force following Spain's ratification.

== 1819 ==
=== January 1819 ===
- January – The Panic of 1819 begins as inflation grows while real estate and cotton prices decline.
- January 1 – Smith Thompson becomes secretary of the navy, filling the vacancy left by Benjamin Williams Crowninshield.
- January 4 – Alexander Hill Everett becomes chargé d'affaires to the Netherlands.
- January 11 – Monroe nominates William Davies to the United States District Court for the District of Georgia.
- January 21 – Charles Hughes becomes chargé d'affaires to Sweden.
- January 25 – The Senate ratifies the Treaty of 1818 with the United Kingdom.

=== February 1819 ===
- February 7 – George W. Campbell becomes minister to Russia.
- February 15 – Congressman James Tallmadge Jr. introduces an amendment that would forbid the importation of slaves to Missouri should it became a state and move toward the abolition of slavery in the region.
- February 17 – The Supreme Court issues its decision in Sturges v. Crowninshield. It rules that states can have their own bankruptcy laws so long as they do not contradict federal law.
- February 20 – Monroe nominates John G. Jackson to the United States District Court for the Western District of Virginia.
- February 22 – The Adams–Onís Treaty with Spain, which would transfer Spanish territories to the United States, is signed.
- February 27 – The United States signs a treaty with the Cherokee.

=== March 1819 ===
- March 1 – The USS Columbus is launched at Washington Navy Yard.
- March 2
  - The Steerage Act of 1819 is signed, establishing regulations for travel by sea.
  - The Arkansas Territory (then spelled Arkansaw) is formed from the southern land of the Missouri Territory.
  - Alabama is authorized to create a constitution in anticipation of statehood.
- March 3
  - Monroe nominates Nathaniel Pope to the United States District Court for the District of Illinois.
  - An act is signed to promote the assimilation of Native American tribes into American culture.
  - An act is signed to create a government in East Florida and West Florida.
  - An act is signed directing the navy to enforce the prohibition on importing slaves.
  - An act is passed setting out how naval ships are to be named.
  - The 15th United States Congress adjourns its second session.
- March 6 – The Supreme Court issues its decision in McCulloch v. Maryland. It rules that states cannot tax the Second Bank of the United States.
- March 30 – Monroe begins a tour of Virginia, North Carolina, South Carolina, Georgia, Tennessee, Kentucky, and Indiana.

=== May 1819 ===
- May 15 – George W. Erving ends his tenure as minister to Spain.
- May 18 – John Forsyth becomes minister to Spain.

=== June 1819 ===
- June 24 – John Graham becomes minister to Portugal.

=== July 1819 ===
- July 6 – Monroe authorizes an expedition to the mouth of the Yellowstone River.
- July 24 – Thomas Sumter Jr. ends his tenure as minister to Portugal.
- July 30 – The United States signs a treaty with the Kickapoo.

=== August 1819 ===
- August 8 – Monroe concludes his tour of the southern and western states.
- August 30 – The United States signs a treaty with the Kickapoo.

=== September 1819 ===
- September 24 – The United States signs the Treaty of Saginaw with the Chippewa.

=== November 1819 ===
- November 3 – Monroe appoints Theodorick Bland to the United States District Court for the District of Maryland as a recess appointment.
- November 24 – Monroe appoints Roger Skinner to the United States District Court for the Northern District of New York as a recess appointment.

=== December 1819 ===
- December 6 – The 16th United States Congress opens its first session.
- December 7 – Monroe delivers the 1819 State of the Union Address.
- December 14 – Alabama is admitted to the United States as the twenty-second state.

== 1820 ==
=== January 1820 ===
- January 3 – Monroe nominates his recess appointments Theodorick Bland and Roger Skinner to their respective district courts.

=== March 1820 ===
- March 6 – Monroe signs the Missouri Compromise, which preserves the equal ratio of slave states and free states. It allows Missouri to be admitted as a slave state and Maine to be admitted as a free state.
- March 15 – Maine is admitted to the United States as the twenty-third state.
- March 17 – Monroe declares that the federal government had guaranteed to Georgia in 1802 that Native Americans would be expelled from the state.

=== April 1820 ===
- April 24 – The Public Land Act of 1820 adjusts the price and minimum area of land purchases.

=== May 1820 ===
- May 10 – Monroe nominates Charles Tait to the United States District Court for the District of Alabama.
- May 15
  - Monroe signs the Tenure of Office Act, establishing terms of four years for many appointed positions with the option of reappointment.
  - The 16th United States Congress adjourns its first session.
- May 30 – The USS Ohio is launched at New York Navy Yard.

=== June 1820 ===
- June 13 – John Graham ends his tenure as minister to Portugal. John James Appleton becomes chargé d'affaires ad interim.
- June 16 – The United States signs a treaty with the Chippewa.

=== July 1820 ===
- July 6 – The United States signs a treaty with the Chippewa and Ottawa.
- July 8 – George W. Campbell ends his tenure as minister to Russia.
- July 19 – The United States signs a treaty with the Kickapoo.

=== September 1820 ===
- September 7 – The USS North Carolina is launched at the Philadelphia Navy Yard.

=== October 1820 ===
- October 18 – The United States signs a treaty with the Choctaw.
- October 21 – The USS Delaware is launched at Norfolk Navy Yard.

=== November 1820 ===
- November 13 – The 16th United States Congress opens its second session.
- November 14 – Monroe delivers the 1820 State of the Union Address.

=== December 1820 ===
- December 6 – Monroe is reelected as the president of the United States. He receives 231 of 232 electoral votes, with one going to John Quincy Adams. Daniel D. Tompkins is reelected as vice president.

== 1821 ==
=== January 1821 ===
- January 8 – The United States signs a treaty with the Creek.

=== February 1821 ===
- February 19 – The Senate ratifies the Adams–Onís Treaty with Spain.
- February 22 – Monroe approves the Adams–Onís Treaty and it enters into force.

=== March 1821 ===
- March 1 – Monroe nominates John Dick to the United States District Court for the District of Louisiana.
- March 2
  - Monroe signs the Military Establishment Act to reduce the United States Army by 40 percent.
  - In response to the Panic of 1819, Monroe signs the Land Act of 1821 that allows purchasers of land to relinquish portions of their land in exchange for debt relief.
- March 3
  - The Supreme Court issues its decision in Cohens v. Virginia. It rules that the Supreme Court has the final authority over any dispute with a state government if it pertains to federal law.
  - The 16th United States Congress adjourns its second session.
- March 4 – Monroe is inaugurated for his second term as president.

=== May 1821 ===
- May 15 – Monroe attempts to appoint Thomas U. P. Charlton to the United States District Court for the District of Georgia as a recess appointment, but Charlton declines.

=== June 1821 ===
- June 12 – Monroe appoints Jeremiah La Touche Cuyler to the United States District Court for the District of Georgia as a recess appointment.
- June 17 – Henry Middleton becomes minister to Russia.

=== July 1821 ===
- July 12 – John James Appleton ends his tenure as chargé d'affaires ad interim to Portugal.

=== August 1821 ===
- August 10 – Missouri is admitted to the United States as the twenty-fourth state.
- August 29 – The United States signs a treaty with the Chippewa, Ottawa, and Potawatomi.

=== December 1821 ===
- December 3
  - The 17th United States Congress opens its first session.
  - Monroe delivers the 1821 State of the Union Address.
- December 19 – Monroe nominates his recess appointment Jeremiah La Touche Cuyler to the United States District Court for the District of Georgia.

== 1822 ==
=== February 1822 ===
- February 1 – The Senate ratifies ratifies a treaty of peace and amity with Algiers from 1816.
- February 11 – Monroe signs the 1816 peace and amity treaty with Algiers.
- February 15 – Monroe nominates Ashur Ware to the United States District Court for the District of Maine.

=== March 1822 ===
- March – The USS Potomac is launched at Washington Navy Yard.
- March 8 – Monroe proposes that the United States recognize republics in the Western Hemisphere.
- March 26 – Monroe nominates James H. Peck to the United States District Court for the District of Missouri.
- March 30 – The Florida Territory is established.

=== May 1822 ===
- May 4
  - Monroe vetoes the extension of the Cumberland Road to Zanesville, Ohio, challenging its constitutionality.
  - Monroe signs an act authorizing and funding diplomatic missions to Central and South America.
- May 6 – The closure of Indian trading houses is ordered.
- May 7 – Henry Dearborn becomes minister to Portugal.
- May 8 – The 17th United States Congress adjourns its first session.

=== June 1822 ===
- June 24 – France and the United States sign a treaty of navigation and commerce.

=== July 1822 ===
- July 12 – The United Kingdom and the United States sign a treaty to resolve claims.

=== August 1822 ===
- August 31 – The United States signs a treaty with the Osage.

=== September 1822 ===
- September 3 – The United States signs a treaty with the Fox and Sauk.

=== December 1822 ===
- December 2 – The 17th United States Congress opens its second session.
- December 3 – Monroe delivers the 1822 State of the Union Address.

== 1823 ==
=== January 1823 ===
- January 3 – The Senate ratifies the 1822 treaty of claims with the United Kingdom.
- January 31 – The Senate ratifies the treaty of navigation and commerce with France.

=== February 1823 ===
- February 7 – Monroe nominates Thomas Lee to the United States District Court for the District of South Carolina.
- February 12 – The treaty of navigation and commerce between France and the United States comes into force.
- February 28 – The Maumee Road is authorized.

=== March 1823 ===
- March 2 – John Forsyth ends his tenure as minister to Spain.
- March 3
  - A government is created for the Florida Territory.
  - Monroe signs an act to establish a national armory on waterways in the western United States.
  - The 17th United States Congress adjourns its second session.

=== May 1823 ===
- May 6 – Monroe appoints Willard Hall to the United States District Court for the District of Delaware as a recess appointment.
- May 16 – Albert Gallatin ends his tenure as minister to France.

=== June 1823 ===
- June 25 – Monroe appoints Peter Randolph to the United States District Court for the District of Mississippi as a recess appointment.

=== July 1823 ===
- July 1 – John McLean succeeds Return J. Meigs Jr. as postmaster general.

=== September 1823 ===
- September 1 – Monroe appoints secretary of the navy Smith Thompson to the Supreme Court as a recess appointment.
- September 16 – Samuel L. Southard becomes secretary of the navy to fill the vacancy left by Smith Thompson.
- September 18 – The United States signs a treaty with Florida Tribes.

=== December 1823 ===
- December 1 – The 18th United States Congress opens its first session.
- December 2 – Monroe delivers the 1823 State of the Union Address. It includes a description of his foreign policy, including neutrality in European conflicts and an assertion that the Western Hemisphere is under the United States' sphere of influence. This becomes the Monroe Doctrine that defines American foreign policy over the following century.
- December 4 – Hugh Nelson becomes minister to Spain.
- December 5
  - Monroe nominates his recess appointment Smith Thompson to his Supreme Court seat.
  - Monroe nominates his recess appointments Willard Hall and Peter Randolph to their respective district court seats.
- December 16 – Richard C. Anderson Jr. becomes the first US minister to Colombia.
- December 27 – Caesar Augustus Rodney becomes the first US minister to Argentina.

== 1824 ==
=== January 1824 ===
- January 1 – A delegation of Cherokee chiefs arrives in Washington, D.C. to negotiate their residence in Georgia. Despite initial progress, they are ultimately unsuccessful.

=== February 1824 ===
- February 24 – The Treaty with Tunis is signed by Tunis and the United States.

=== March 1824 ===
- March 2 – The Supreme Court issues its decision in Gibbons v. Ogden. It rules that the Commerce Clause of the Constitution allows federal laws to supersede state laws in issues of navigation.
- March 30 – Monroe warns that the United States has not expelled Native Americans from Georgia but discourages the use of force to do so.

=== April 1824 ===
- April 7 – Alexander Hill Everett ends his tenure as chargé d'affaires to the Netherlands.
- April 13 – James Brown becomes minister to France.
- April 17 – The Russo-American Treaty of 1824 is signed.
- April 23 – Heman Allen becomes the first US minister to Chile.
- April 30 – Monroe signs the General Survey Act that authorizes the United States Army Corps of Engineers to plan internal improvements.

=== May 1824 ===
- May 10 – Monroe nominates William Wilkins to the United States District Court for the Western District of Pennsylvania.
- May 22 – Monroe signs the Tariff of 1824 over the objection of southern states.
- May 24
  - Monroe signs the Rivers and Harbors Act to fund the improvement of the Mississippi River and the Ohio River.
  - Monroe nominates Thomas B. Robertson to the district courts for the Eastern District and the Western District of Louisiana.
- May 27 – The 18th United States Congress adjourns its first session.

=== June 1824 ===
- June 10 – Caesar Augustus Rodney ends his tenure as minister to Argentina.
- June 30 – Henry Dearborn ends his tenure as minister to Portugal.

=== August 1824 ===
- August 4
  - Monroe nominates John Pitman to the United States District Court for the District of Rhode Island as a recess appointment.
  - The United States signs treaties with the Fox, Sauk, and Iowa.
- August 13 – Monroe appoints Elias Glenn to the United States District Court for the District of Maryland as a recess appointment.
- August 15 – French philosopher Marquis de Lafayette makes a high-profile visit to the United States.

=== September 1824 ===
- September 6 – Marquis de Lafayette leaves the United States after touring every state.

=== October 1824 ===
- October 3
  - The Anderson–Gual Treaty is signed by Gran Colombia and the United States.
  - The Russo-American Treaty of 1824 is signed by Russia and the United States.

=== December 1824 ===
- December 6 – The 18th United States Congress opens its second session.
- December 7 – Monroe delivers the 1824 State of the Union Address.
- December 16 – Monroe nominates his recess appointments Elias Glenn and John Pitman to their respective district court seats.

== 1825 ==
=== January 1825 ===
- January 1 – Monroe expels the Cherokee from Georgia.
- January 5 – The Senate ratifies the Russo-American Treaty of 1824.
- January 13 – The Senate ratifies the Treaty with Tunis.
- January 20 – The United States signs a treaty with the Choctaw.

=== February 1825 ===
- February 12 – The United States signs a treaty with the Creek.
- February 28 – Monroe submits a treaty with the Creek that transfers their land to the United States. It will be ratified on March 7, three days after Monroe's presidency ends, but later found invalid and replaced in 1826.

=== March 1825 ===
- March 3
  - Monroe signs a bill authorizing the Chesapeake and Ohio Canal to be extended to Washington D.C.
  - The Senate ratifies the Russo-American Treaty of 1824.
  - The 18th United States Congress adjourns its second session.
- March 4 – Monroe's presidency ends and John Quincy Adams is inaugurated as the sixth president of the United States.

== Works cited ==
- Bevans, Charles I. (1968). Treaties and Other International Agreements of the United States of America, 1776-1949. United States Department of State.
- Hall, Kermit L.; Ely, James W., eds. (2009). The Oxford Guide to United States Supreme Court Decisions (2nd ed.). Oxford University Press.
- Stathis, Stephen W. (2014). Landmark Legislation 1774–2012: Major U.S. Acts and Treaties (2nd ed.). CQ Press. ISBN 978-1-4522-9230-4.
