= Timeline of the John Quincy Adams presidency =

The presidency of John Quincy Adams began on March 4, 1825, when John Quincy Adams was inaugurated as the 6th president of the United States, and ended on March 4, 1829, after one term.

== 1825 ==
=== March 1825 ===
- March 4 – John Quincy Adams is inaugurated as the sixth president of the United States. John C. Calhoun becomes vice president. Adams retains William Wirt as attorney general, John McLean as United States Postmaster General, and Samuel L. Southard as secretary of the Navy.
- March 7 – Henry Clay becomes secretary of state and James Barbour becomes secretary of war. Richard Rush becomes secretary of the treasury, but Secretary of the Navy Samuel L. Southard serves as acting secretary until Rush arrives in August.

=== May 1825 ===
- May 6 – Adams appoints Philip C. Pendleton to the District Court for the Western District of Virginia as a recess appointment.
- May 27 – A Convention of Peace, Amity, Navigation, and Commerce with Gran Colombia comes into force.

=== June 1825 ===
- June 1 – Joel Roberts Poinsett becomes the first United States Minister Plenipotentiary to Mexico.
- June 2 – The United States signs the Osage Treaty with the Osage Nation.
- June 3 – The United States signs a treaty with the Kansa people.
- June 9 – The United States signs the Treaty of White Paint Creek with the Ponca people.
- June 16 – The frigate USS Brandywine is launched at Washington Navy Yard.
- June 22 – The United States signs the Treaty of Fort Lookout with the Sioux.
- June 24 – Thomas L. L. Brent becomes Chargé d'Affaires to Portugal.

=== July 1825 ===
- July 5
  - Christopher Hughes ends his tenure as Chargé d'Affaires to Sweden.
  - Adams appoints George Hay to the District Court for the Eastern District of Virginia as a recess appointment.
  - The United States signs the Treaty of Teton River with the Sioux.
- July 6 – The United States signs the Treaty of Teton River with the Cheyenne.
- July 7 – Captain David Porter of the United States Navy is court-martialed for his unauthorized landing in Fajardo, Puerto Rico, the previous November.
- July 10 – Hugh Nelson ends his tenure as Minister Plenipotentiary to Spain.
- July 16 – The United States signs the Treaty of Arikara with the Sioux.
- July 18 – The United States signs the Treaty of Arikara with the Arikara.
- July 30 – The United States signs the Treaty of Mandan with the Hidatsa and the Mandan.

=== August 1825 ===
- August 1 – Secretary of the Treasury Richard Rush begins his duties.
- August 4 – The United States signs the Treaty of Mandan with the Crow people.
- August 10 – The United States signs the Treaty of Council Grove with the Osage.
- August 16 – The United States signs the Treaty of Sora Kansas Creek with the Kansa people.
- August 19 – The United States signs the First Treaty of Prairie du Chien with several tribes.
- August 20 – John Murray Forbes becomes Chargé d'Affaires to Buenos Aires.
- August 27 – Adams appoints Alfred Conkling to the District Court for the Northern District of New York as a recess appointment. He attempts to appoint Daniel Smith to the District Court for the Western District of Virginia, but Smith declines.

=== September 1825 ===
- September 4 – Alexander Hill Everett becomes Minister Plenipotentiary to Spain.
- September 26 – The United States signs the Treaty of Fort Atkinson with the Otoe and Missouria.
- September 30 – The United States signs the Treaty of Fort Atkinson with the Pawnee people.

=== October 1825 ===
- October 1 – The Tennessee General Assembly votes to support Andrew Jackson in the 1928 presidential election.
- October 6 – The United States signs the Treaty of Fort Atkinson with the Makah.
- October 15 – The sloop-of-war USS Boston is launched at Boston Navy Yard.
- October 26 – The Erie Canal is completed, connecting New York City to Lake Erie.
- October 28 – Adams appoints Alexander Caldwell to the District Court for the Western District of Virginia as a recess appointment.

=== November 1825 ===
- November 7 – The United States signs the Treaty of St. Louis with the Shawnee.
- November 11 – Rufus King becomes Minister Plenipotentiary to the United Kingdom.

=== December 1825 ===
- December 5
  - The 19th United States Congress convenes for its first session.
  - The United States signs a Convention of Peace, Amity, Commerce, and Navigation with the Federal Republic of Central America.
- December 6 – Adams delivers the 1825 State of the Union Address.
- December 13 – Adams nominates his recess appointments George Hay, Alfred Conkling, and Alexander Caldwell to their respective seats.
- December 26 – Adams informs Congress he is going to send two delegates to the Congress of Panama.

== 1826 ==
=== January 1826 ===
- January 24 – The United States signs the Treaty of Washington with the Shawnee.

=== February 1826 ===
- February 16 – Adams informs the Senate that he has provided information about the "congress at Panama".
- February 17 – Adams nominates Israel Pickens to the district courts for the Northern District and for the Southern District of Alabama. Pickens is confirmed, but he declines.

=== March 1826 ===
- March 3 – Senator John Randolph rebukes Adams and says his message about the "congress at Panama" was an attack on the Senate.
- March 26 – The United States joins its first multilateral treaty when it is a signatory of the Cemetery in Algiers.

=== April 1826 ===
- April 11 – Adams nominates Robert Trimble to the Supreme Court to fill the vacancy left by Thomas Todd.
- April 26 – The United States signs a Convention of Friendship, Commerce, and Navigation with Denmark.
- April 27 – The sloop-of-war USS Vincennes is launched at New York.

=== May 1826 ===
- May 1 – Standardized training manuals are ordered for military and militia personnel.
- May 3 – John Williams becomes the first United States Chargé d'Affaires to Central America.
- May 4 – Congress approves funding for two delegates to attend the Congress of Panama.
- May 5 – Adams nominates William Crawford to the district courts for the Northern District and for the Southern District of Alabama.
- May 9 – The Senate confirms Adams's nomination of Robert Trimble to the Supreme Court.
- May 15 – Adams nominates William Bristol to the District Court for the District of Connecticut.
- May 22 – The 19th United States Congress adjourns from its first session.

=== June 1826 ===
- June 11 – The sloop-of-war USS Lexington is commissioned at New York navy Yard.
- June 16 – Rufus King ends his tenure as Minister Plenipotentiary to the United Kingdom.

=== July 1826 ===
- July 4
  - Former presidents John Adams and Thomas Jefferson, the former being John Quincy Adams's father, die on the same day.
  - Celebrations are held in Washington for the fiftieth anniversary of the signing of the Declaration of Independence.
- July 10 – Christopher Hughes becomes Chargé d'Affaires to the Netherlands.
- July 24 – Richard C. Anderson Jr. ends his tenure as Minister Plenipotentiary to Gran Colombia.

=== August 1826 ===
- August 2 – The Convention of Peace, Amity, Commerce, and Navigation with Central America comes into force.
- August 3 – The United States acquires the USS Hudson, which had originally been constructed for Greek buyers.
- August 5 – The United States signs the Treaty of Fond du Lac with the Chippewa.
- August 10 – The Convention of Friendship, Commerce, and Navigation with Denmark comes into force.

=== September 1826 ===
- September 1 – Albert Gallatin becomes Minister Plenipotentiary to the United Kingdom.

=== October 1826 ===
- October 16 – The United States signs the Treaty of Mississinewas with the Potawatomi.
- October 20 – Adams appoints John Boyle to the District Court for the District of Kentucky as a recess appointment.
- October 23 – The United States signs the Treaty of Mississinewas with the Miami people.
- October 28 – John James Appleton becomes Chargé d'Affaires to Sweden.

=== November 1826 ===
- November 1 – The United Kingdom and the United States come to an agreement on restitution for the War of 1812.
- November 8 – The 1826 United States elections lead to both chambers of Congress having a majority supporting Andre Jackson.
- November 10 – Adams appoints William Rossell to the District Court for the District of New Jersey as a recess appointment.
- November 13 – A convention is signed between the United States and the United Kingdom to settle unresolved claims.

=== December 1826 ===
- December 1 – John Williams ends his tenure as Chargé d'Affaires to Central America.
- December 4 – The 19th United States Congress convenes for its second session.
- December 5 – Adams delivers the 1826 State of the Union Address.
- December 13 – Adams nominates his recess appointments John Boyle and William Rossell to their respective seats.
- December 19 – Adams nominates Samuel Betts to the District Court for the Southern District of New York.

== 1827 ==
=== January 1827 ===
- January 14 – The sloop-of-war USS Warren is commissioned at Boston Navy Yard.

=== February 1827 ===
- February 5 – Adams speaks to Congress about the rights of the Creek people.
- February 6 – The treaty settling unresolved claims between the United States and the United Kingdom comes into force.
- February 19 – The Supreme Court issues its decision in Ogden v. Saunders. It rules that state bankruptcy laws only apply to contracts formed after the law's passage.

=== March 1827 ===
- March 1 – Adams prohibits trade with the United Kingdom.
- March 3
  - Beaufort Taylor Watts becomes Chargé d'Affaires to Gran Colombia.
  - The 19th United States Congress adjourns from its second session.
- March 12 – The Supreme Court issues its decision in Brown v. Maryland. It rules that states cannot levy taxes on imported goods until the goods are mixed into general property in the state.

=== April 1827 ===
- April 16 – Condy Raguet ends his tenure as Chargé d'Affaires to Brazil.

=== May 1827 ===
- May 21 – James Cooley becomes the first United States Chargé d'Affaires to Peru.

=== July 1827 ===
- July 4 – The United States signs a Treaty of Commerce and Navigation with Sweden and Norway. It replaces the previous Treaty of Friendship and Commerce that had expired the previous September.
- July 26 – The sloop-of-war USS Natchez departs after being launched at Norfolk Navy Yard.
- July 31 – Heman Allen ends his tenure as Minister Plenipotentiary to Chile.

=== August 1827 ===
- August 11 – The United States signs a treaty with the Chippewa, Menominee, and Winnebago peoples.

=== September 1827 ===
- September 19 – The United States signs the Treaty of St. Joseph with the Potawatomi.
- September 20 – Henry Wheaton becomes the first United States Chargé d'Affaires to Denmark.

=== October 1827 ===
- October 4 – Albert Gallatin ends his tenure as Minister Plenipotentiary to the United Kingdom.

=== November 1827 ===
- November 3 – The sloop-of-war USS Falmouth is launched at Boston Navy Yard.
- November 15 – The United States signs the Treaty of Creek Agency with the Creek people.
- November 21 – Beaufort Taylor Watts ends his tenure as Chargé d'Affaires to Gran Colombia.

=== December 1827 ===
- December 3 – The 20th United States Congress convenes for its first session.
- December 4 – Adams delivers the 1827 State of the Union Address.
- December 20 – The United States signs a Convention of Friendship, Commerce, and Navigation with the Hanseatic Republics.

== 1828 ==
=== January 1828 ===
- January 1
  - Nicholas Biddle authorizes the sale of government securities through the First Bank of the United States.
  - American diplomat Joel Roberts Poinsett negotiates a border agreement with Mexico.
- January 12 – The United States signs a treaty with Mexico defining their border, though it will not by ratified by Mexico until 1832.
- January 18 – The Treaty of Commerce and Navigation with Sweden and Norway comes into force.

=== February 1828 ===
- February 1 – Guatemalan diplomat Antonio José Caóaz proposes the construction of a Nicaragua Canal to the United States.
- February 11 – The United States signs the Treaty of Wyandot with the Miami.
- February 24 – James Cooley ends his tenure as Chargé d'Affaires of Peru.

=== May 1828 ===
- May 1 – The United States signs a Treaty of Commerce and Navigation with the Kingdom of Prussia.
- May 6 – The United States signs treaties with the Cherokee.
- May 11 – The Tariff of Abominations is passed, establishing tariffs on raw materials. The tariff benefited New England and was detrimental to the Southern United States.
- May 26
  - Peter B. Porter succeeds James Barbour as secretary of war. Secretary of the Navy Samuel L. Southard serves as acting secretary of war until Porter arrives in June.
  - The 20th United States Congress adjourns from its first session.

=== June 1828 ===
- June 2 – The Convention of Friendship, Commerce, and Navigation with the Hanseatic Republics comes into force.
- June 21 – Secretary of War Peter B. Porter begins his duties.
- June 25 – William Tudor becomes Chargé d'Affaires to Brazil.
- June 28 – The sloop-of-war USS Fairfield is launched at New York Navy Yard.

=== August 1828 ===
- August 18 – The sloop-of-war USS St. Louis is launched at the Washington Navy Yard.
- August 25
  - Supreme Court Justice Robert Trimble dies.
  - The United States signs the Treaty of Green Bay with several tribes.

=== September 1828 ===
- September 20 – The United States signs the Treaty of St. Joseph with the Potawatomi.
- September 24 – The sloop-of-war USS Concord is launched at Portsmouth Navy Yard.

=== October 1828 ===
- October 3 – Adams appoints Joseph Hopkinson to the District Court for the Eastern District of Pennsylvania.

=== November 1828 ===
- November 1
  - Andrew Jackson defeats Adams in the 1828 presidential election. Vice President John C. Calhoun is reelected, having chosen to be Jackson's running mate instead of Adams's.
  - Adams appoints William Creighton Jr. to the District Court for the District of Ohio as a recess appointment.
- November 9 – Samuel Larned becomes Chargé d'Affaires to Chile.
- November 24 – James Barbour becomes Minister Plenipotentiary to the United Kingdom.

=== December 1828 ===
- December 1
  - Vice President Calhoun anonymously writes South Carolina Exposition and Protest, which encourages South Carolina to nullify the Tariff of Abominations.
  - The 20th United States Congress convenes for its second session.
- December 2 – Adams delivers the 1828 State of the Union Address.
- December 11 – Adams nominates his recess appointments Joseph Hopkinson and William Creighton Jr. to their respective seats. No vote is held for Creighton's nomination.
- December 12 – The United States signs a Convention of Peace, Friendship, Commerce, and Navigation with the Empire of Brazil.
- December 17 – Adams nominates John J. Crittenden to the Supreme Court, but no vote is held to confirm him. The Senate rejects the nomination so Andrew Jackson will be able to make his own nomination for the seat.

== 1829 ==
=== January 1829 ===
- January 6 – Adams nominates Henry H. Gurley to the district courts for the Eastern District and for the Western District of Louisiana. The Senate never votes to confirm the nominations.

=== February 1829 ===
- February 13 – William Henry Harrison becomes Chargé d'Affaires to Gran Colombia.

=== March 1829 ===
- March 3 – The 20th United States Congress adjourns from its second session.
- March 4 – Adams's presidency ends and Andrew Jackson is inaugurated as the seventh president of the United States.

== Works cited ==
- Bevans, Charles I. (1968). Treaties and Other International Agreements of the United States of America, 1776-1949. United States Department of State.
- Hall, Kermit L.; Ely, James W., eds. (2009). The Oxford Guide to United States Supreme Court Decisions (2nd ed.). Oxford University Press.
- Stathis, Stephen W. (2014). Landmark Legislation 1774–2012: Major U.S. Acts and Treaties (2nd ed.). CQ Press. ISBN 978-1-4522-9230-4.
