= Inauguration of James Monroe =

Inauguration of James Monroe may refer to:

- First inauguration of James Monroe, 1817
- Second inauguration of James Monroe, 1821

== See also ==
- The full text of James Monroe's First Inaugural Address at Wikisource
- The full text of James Monroe's Second Inaugural Address at Wikisource
