= List of United States Supreme Court cases, volume 15 =

Supreme Court of the United States
- Interactive map of Supreme Court of the United States
- 38°53′26″N 77°00′16″W
- Established: March 4, 1789; 237 years ago
- Location: Washington, D.C.
- Coordinates: 38°53′26″N 77°00′16″W
- Composition method: Presidential nomination with Senate confirmation
- Authorised by: Constitution of the United States, Art. III, § 1
- Judge term length: life tenure, subject to impeachment and removal
- Number of positions: 9 (by statute)
- Website: supremecourt.gov

This is a list of cases reported in volume 15 (2 Wheat.) of United States Reports, decided by the Supreme Court of the United States in 1817.

== Nominative reports ==
In 1874, the U.S. government created the United States Reports, and retroactively numbered older privately published case reports as part of the new series. As a result, cases appearing in volumes 1–90 of U.S. Reports have dual citation forms; one for the volume number of U.S. Reports, and one for the volume number of the reports named for the relevant reporter of decisions (these are called "nominative reports").

=== Henry Wheaton ===
Starting with the 14th volume of U.S. Reports, the Reporter of Decisions of the Supreme Court of the United States was Henry Wheaton. Wheaton was Reporter of Decisions from 1816 to 1827, covering volumes 14 through 25 of United States Reports which correspond to volumes 1 through 12 of his Wheaton's Reports. As such, the dual form of citation to, for example, Beverly v. Brooke is 15 U.S. (2 Wheat.) 100 (1817).

== Justices of the Supreme Court at the time of 15 U.S. (2 Wheat.) ==
The Supreme Court is established by Article III, Section 1 of the Constitution of the United States, which says: "The judicial Power of the United States, shall be vested in one supreme Court . . .". The size of the Court is not specified; the Constitution leaves it to Congress to set the number of justices. Under the Judiciary Act of 1789 Congress originally fixed the number of justices at six (one chief justice and five associate justices). Since 1789 Congress has varied the size of the Court from six to seven, nine, ten, and back to nine justices (always including one chief justice).

When the cases in 15 U.S. (2 Wheat.) were decided, the Court comprised these seven justices:

Portrait	Justice	Office	Home State	Succeeded	Date confirmed by the Senate (Vote)	Tenure on Supreme Court
	John Marshall	Chief Justice	Virginia	Oliver Ellsworth	January 27, 1801 (Acclamation)	February 4, 1801 – July 6, 1835 (Died)
	Bushrod Washington	Associate Justice	Virginia	James Wilson	December 20, 1798 (Acclamation)	November 9, 1798 (Recess Appointment) – November 26, 1829 (Died)
	William Johnson	Associate Justice	South Carolina	Alfred Moore	March 24, 1804 (Acclamation)	May 7, 1804 – August 4, 1834 (Died)
	Henry Brockholst Livingston	Associate Justice	New York	William Paterson	December 17, 1806 (Acclamation)	January 20, 1807 – March 18, 1823 (Died)
	Thomas Todd	Associate Justice	Kentucky	new seat	March 2, 1807 (Acclamation)	March 3, 1807 – February 7, 1826 (Died)
	Gabriel Duvall	Associate Justice	Maryland	Samuel Chase	November 18, 1811 (Acclamation)	November 23, 1811 – January 12, 1835 (Resigned)
	Joseph Story	Associate Justice	Massachusetts	William Cushing	November 18, 1811 (Acclamation)	February 3, 1812 – September 10, 1845 (Died)

== Notable Case in 15 U.S. (2 Wheat.) ==
=== Laidlaw v. Organ ===
Laidlaw v. Organ, 15 U.S. (2 Wheat.) 178 (1817), established the rule of caveat emptor in the United States. The Supreme Court's opinion can be interpreted to mean that withholding information calculated to deceive the other party can cause a contract to be void on equitable grounds. Laidlaw has been recognized by US legal scholars as a central case in the history of US contract law. It was the first case in which the Supreme Court adopted the rule of caveat emptor and "was one of the first cases to come before the [Supreme] Court involving a contract for future delivery of a commodity." It is also the first case to start to articulate a doctrine of forbidding active concealment.

== Citation style ==
Under the Judiciary Act of 1789 the federal court structure at the time comprised District Courts, which had general trial jurisdiction; Circuit Courts, which had mixed trial and appellate (from the US District Courts) jurisdiction; and the United States Supreme Court, which had appellate jurisdiction over the federal District and Circuit courts—and for certain issues over state courts. The Supreme Court also had limited original jurisdiction (i.e., in which cases could be filed directly with the Supreme Court without first having been heard by a lower federal or state court). There were one or more federal District Courts and/or Circuit Courts in each state, territory, or other geographical region.

Bluebook citation style is used for case names, citations, and jurisdictions.

- "C.C.D." = United States Circuit Court for the District of . . .
  - e.g.,"C.C.D.N.J." = United States Circuit Court for the District of New Jersey
- "D." = United States District Court for the District of . . .
  - e.g.,"D. Mass." = United States District Court for the District of Massachusetts
- "E." = Eastern; "M." = Middle; "N." = Northern; "S." = Southern; "W." = Western
  - e.g.,"C.C.S.D.N.Y." = United States Circuit Court for the Southern District of New York
  - e.g.,"M.D. Ala." = United States District Court for the Middle District of Alabama
- "Ct. Cl." = United States Court of Claims
- The abbreviation of a state's name alone indicates the highest appellate court in that state's judiciary at the time.
  - e.g.,"Pa." = Supreme Court of Pennsylvania
  - e.g.,"Me." = Supreme Judicial Court of Maine

== List of cases in 15 U.S. (2 Wheat.) ==
Case Name	Page and year	Opinion of the Court	Concurring opinion(s)	Dissenting opinion(s)	Lower court	Disposition
Slocum v. Mayberry	1 (1817)	Marshall	none	none	R.I.	affirmed
Greenleaf v. Cook	13 (1817)	Marshall	none	none	C.C.D.C.	reversed
Otis v. Walter	18 (1817)	Johnson	none	none	Mass.	reversed
M'Iver v. Ragan	25 (1817)	Marshall	none	none	C.C.D.W. Tenn.	affirmed
Hunter v. Bryant	32 (1817)	Johnson	none	none	C.C.D. Pa.	reversed
Duvall v. Craig	45 (1817)	Story	none	none	C.C.D. Ky.	reversed
Coolidge v. Payson	66 (1817)	Marshall	none	none	not indicated	affirmed
The Dos Hermanos	76 (1817)	Story	none	none	D. La.	affirmed
Beverly v. Brooke	100 (1817)	Marshall	none	none	C.C.D.C.	affirmed
McCoul v. Lekamp's Administratrix	111 (1817)	Marshall	none	none	C.C.D. Va.	affirmed
United States v. Sheldon	119 (1817)	Washington	none	none	C.C.D. Vt.	certification
The Mary	123 (1817)	Johnson	none	none	C.C.D. Mass.	reversed
The San Pedro	132 (1817)	Washington	none	none	Super. Ct. Terr. Miss.	dismissed
The Ariadne	143 (1817)	Washington	none	none	C.C.D. Pa.	affirmed
The William King	148 (1817)	Johnson	none	none	C.C.D.N.Y.	affirmed
The Fortuna	161 (1817)	Johnson	none	none	C.C.D.N.C.	certification
The Bothnea	169 (1817)	Johnson	none	none	C.C.D. Mass.	reversed
Laidlaw v. Organ	178 (1817)	Marshall	none	none	D. La.	reversed
Rutherford v. Greene's Heirs	196 (1817)	Marshall	none	none	C.C.D. Tenn.	affirmed
Johnson v. Pannel's Heirs	206 (1817)	Marshall	none	none	C.C.D. Ky.	affirmed
Patterson v. United States	221 (1817)	Washington	none	none	C.C.D. Md.	reversed
The Pizarro	227 (1817)	Story	none	none	C.C.D. Ga.	affirmed
United States v. Tenbroek	248 (1817)	Duvall	none	none	C.C.D. Pa.	dismissed
Chirac v. Chirac's Lessee	259 (1817)	Marshall	none	none	C.C.D. Md.	affirmed
The George	278 (1817)	Johnson	none	none	C.C.D. Mass.	affirmed
The Argo	287 (1817)	Marshall	none	none	C.C.D. Mass.	continued
Morgan's Heirs v. Morgan	290 (1817)	Marshall	none	none	C.C.D. Ky.	reversed
Liter v. Green	306 (1817)	Story	none	none	C.C.D. Ky.	affirmed
Shipp v. Miller's Heirs	316 (1817)	Story	Marshall	Marshall	C.C.D. Ky.	affirmed
The Anna Maria	327 (1817)	Marshall	none	none	C.C.D. Md.	reversed
Colson v. Thompson	336 (1817)	Washington	none	none	C.C.D. Ky.	reversed
The Eleanor	345 (1817)	Johnson	none	none	C.C.D. Mass.	dismissed
Inglee v. Coolidge	363 (1817)	Story	none	none	Mass.	dismissed
M'Cluny v. Silliman	369 (1817)	per curiam	none	none	Ohio	mandamus denied
The London Packet	371 (1817)	Marshall	none	none	not indicated	continued
Lenox v. Roberts	373 (1817)	Marshall	none	none	C.C.D.C.	reversed
Colson v. Lewis	377 (1817)	Washington	none	none	C.C.D. Ky.	certification
Leeds v. Marine Insurance Company	380 (1817)	Washington	none	none	C.C.D.C.	reversed
Raborg v. Peyton	385 (1817)	Story	none	none	C.C.D.C.	certification
Union Bank v. Laird	390 (1817)	Story	none	none	C.C.D.C.	reversed
United States v. Barker	395 (1817)	Marshall	none	none	C.C.D.N.Y.	dismissed
Thelusson v. Smith	396 (1817)	Washington	none	none	C.C.D. Pa.	affirmed

== See also ==
- certificate of division
