= 1816 State of the Union Address =

Speech by US President James Madison

- Date: December 3, 1816
- Venue: House Chamber, United States Capitol
- Location: Washington, D.C.; 38°53′23″N 77°00′32″W
- Type: State of the Union Address
- Participants: James Madison; John Gaillard; Henry Clay
- Format: Written
- Previous: 1815 State of the Union Address
- Next: 1817 State of the Union Address

The 1816 State of the Union Address was the last annual address given by President James Madison, the fourth president of the United States.

== History ==
It was given on Tuesday, December 3, 1816. It was read in Washington, D.C, addressed to both houses of Congress. It was the 26th address given, given to the 14th United States Congress. The United States House of Representatives and Senate were addressed.

== Description ==
To open the speech, Madison acknowledges the recent agricultural shortfall brought on by the Year Without a Summer:

In reviewing the present state of our country, our attention cannot be withheld from the effect produced by peculiar seasons; which have very generally impaired the annual gifts of the Earth, and threaten scarcity in particular districts.

=== International affairs ===
Madison then sets the stage with the recent conclusion of two wars, and the attendant "invigoration of industry." First, the "peace in Europe," referring to the downfall of Napoleon in 1815 and the beginning of what would be called the Pax Britannica. Second, the conclusion of the War of 1812, ushering in the period in the United States that would be called the Era of Good Feelings.

Despite the peaceful era, Madison regrets the weakness of American industry and international trade, noting that a "depression is experienced by particular branches of our manufactures, and by a portion of our navigation."

Nevertheless, Madison asserts that "we remain in amity with foreign powers," albeit with the qualification that an American ship was attacked by a Spanish one in the Gulf of Mexico, and that the state of affairs with Algiers is "not known." (But the relations with the other Barbary states have "undergone no change.")

As to the North American continent, Madison sees overall "tranquillity" in the affairs with Indians, happily promoting "civilization."

I am happy to add, that the tranquillity which has been restored among the Tribes themselves, as well as between them and our own population, favor the resumption of the work of civilization, which had made an encouraging progress among some Tribes; and that the facility is encreasing, for extending that divided and individual ownership, which exists now in moveable property only, to the soil itself, and of thus establishing in the culture and improvement of it; the true foundation for a transit from the habits of the Savage; to the arts and comforts of social life.

=== Domestic affairs ===
Madison then recommends reorganization of the militia, and urges progress on other domestic matters, including a standardization of weights and measures, establishing a university in Washington, DC, reform of the criminal justice system, enforcement against importing slaves, and reform of the executive branch bureaucracy.

Madison next addresses finances, noting a surplus of some nine million dollars in the treasury for 1816—that is, the difference between $47 million in revenue, and $38 million in expenditure. (The national nevertheless had over $100 million in debt.) Madison encourages reform of the monetary system to smooth the handling of the government's finances:

for the interests of the community at large, as well as for the purposes of the Treasury, it is essential that the nation should possess a currency of equal value, credit, and use, wherever it may circulate.

=== Peroration ===
Finally, Madison takes the opportunity to reflect on his years of service in government, thanking the citizens for their "support" and asserting that he is leaving the nation in a prosperous and peaceful state.

I can indulge the proud reflection, that the American people have reached in safety and success their fortieth year, as an independent nation; that for nearly an entire generation, they have had experience of their present constitution, the offspring of their undisturbed deliberations and of their free choice; that they have found it to bear the trials of adverse as well as prosperous circumstances; to contain in its combination of the federate and elective principles, a reconcilement of public strength with individual liberty, of national power for the defence of national rights, with a security against wars of injustice, of ambition or of vain glory, in the fundamental provision which subjects all questions of war to the will of the nation itself, which is to pay its costs, and feel its calamities.

Furthermore, Madison notes that the young nation has room to grow across the continent.

At the end of the speech, focusing on world peace, Madison hopes for a government that:

seeks, by appeals to reason, and by its liberal examples, to infuse into the law which governs the civilised world, a spirit which may diminish the frequency or circumscribe the calamities of war, and meliorate the social and beneficent relations of peace: A Government, in a word, whose conduct within and without, may bespeak the most noble of all ambitions, that of promoting peace on Earth, and good will to man.

== See also ==
- Barbary Wars
- 1816 United States presidential election

Preceded by 1815 State of the Union Address	State of the Union addresses 1816	Succeeded by 1817 State of the Union Address
