= List of United States Supreme Court cases, volume 25 =

Supreme Court of the United States
- Interactive map of Supreme Court of the United States
- 38°53′26″N 77°00′16″W
- Established: March 4, 1789; 237 years ago
- Location: Washington, D.C.
- Coordinates: 38°53′26″N 77°00′16″W
- Composition method: Presidential nomination with Senate confirmation
- Authorised by: Constitution of the United States, Art. III, § 1
- Judge term length: life tenure, subject to impeachment and removal
- Number of positions: 9 (by statute)
- Website: supremecourt.gov

This is a list of cases reported in volume 25 (12 Wheat.) of United States Reports, decided by the Supreme Court of the United States in 1827.

== Nominative report ==
In 1874, the U.S. government created the United States Reports, and retroactively numbered older privately published case reports as part of the new series. As a result, cases appearing in volumes 1–90 of U.S. Reports have dual citation forms; one for the volume number of U.S. Reports, and one for the volume number of the reports named for the relevant reporter of decisions (these are called "nominative reports").

=== Henry Wheaton ===
Starting with the 14th volume of U.S. Reports, the Reporter of Decisions of the Supreme Court of the United States was Henry Wheaton. Wheaton was Reporter of Decisions from 1816 to 1827, covering volumes 14 through 25 of United States Reports which correspond to volumes 1 through 12 of his Wheaton's Reports. As such, the dual form of citation to, for example, Brown v. Maryland is 25 U.S. (12 Wheat.) 419 (1827).

== Justices of the Supreme Court at the time of 25 U.S. (12 Wheat.) ==
The Supreme Court is established by Article III, Section 1 of the Constitution of the United States, which says: "The judicial Power of the United States, shall be vested in one supreme Court . . .". The size of the Court is not specified; the Constitution leaves it to Congress to set the number of justices. Under the Judiciary Act of 1789 Congress originally fixed the number of justices at six (one chief justice and five associate justices). Since 1789 Congress has varied the size of the Court from six to seven, nine, ten, and back to nine justices (always including one chief justice).

When the cases in 25 U.S. (12 Wheat.) were decided, the Court comprised these seven justices:

Portrait	Justice	Office	Home State	Succeeded	Date confirmed by the Senate (Vote)	Tenure on Supreme Court
	John Marshall	Chief Justice	Virginia	Oliver Ellsworth	January 27, 1801 (Acclamation)	February 4, 1801 – July 6, 1835 (Died)
	Bushrod Washington	Associate Justice	Virginia	James Wilson	December 20, 1798 (Acclamation)	November 9, 1798 (Recess Appointment) – November 26, 1829 (Died)
	William Johnson	Associate Justice	South Carolina	Alfred Moore	March 24, 1804 (Acclamation)	May 7, 1804 – August 4, 1834 (Died)
	Gabriel Duvall	Associate Justice	Maryland	Samuel Chase	November 18, 1811 (Acclamation)	November 23, 1811 – January 12, 1835 (Resigned)
	Joseph Story	Associate Justice	Massachusetts	William Cushing	November 18, 1811 (Acclamation)	February 3, 1812 – September 10, 1845 (Died)
	Smith Thompson	Associate Justice	New York	Henry Brockholst Livingston	December 9, 1823 (Acclamation)	September 1, 1823 – December 18, 1843 (Died)
	Robert Trimble	Associate Justice	Kentucky	Thomas Todd	May 9, 1826 (25–5)	June 16, 1826 – August 25, 1828 (Died)

== Notable Case in 25 U.S. (12 Wheat.) ==
=== Ogden v. Saunders ===
In Ogden v. Saunders, 25 U.S. (12 Wheat.) 213 (1827), the Supreme Court determined the scope of a bankruptcy law in relation to a clause of the Constitution of the United States. It is notable for its era in producing multiple opinions from the justices, either writing for the Court, concurring, or dissenting.

== Citation style ==
Under the Judiciary Act of 1789 the federal court structure at the time comprised District Courts, which had general trial jurisdiction; Circuit Courts, which had mixed trial and appellate (from the US District Courts) jurisdiction; and the United States Supreme Court, which had appellate jurisdiction over the federal District and Circuit courts—and for certain issues over state courts. The Supreme Court also had limited original jurisdiction (i.e., in which cases could be filed directly with the Supreme Court without first having been heard by a lower federal or state court). There were one or more federal District Courts and/or Circuit Courts in each state, territory, or other geographical region.

Bluebook citation style is used for case names, citations, and jurisdictions.

- "C.C.D." = United States Circuit Court for the District of . . .
  - e.g.,"C.C.D.N.J." = United States Circuit Court for the District of New Jersey
- "D." = United States District Court for the District of . . .
  - e.g.,"D. Mass." = United States District Court for the District of Massachusetts
- "E." = Eastern; "M." = Middle; "N." = Northern; "S." = Southern; "W." = Western
  - e.g.,"C.C.S.D.N.Y." = United States Circuit Court for the Southern District of New York
  - e.g.,"M.D. Ala." = United States District Court for the Middle District of Alabama
- "Ct. Cl." = United States Court of Claims
- The abbreviation of a state's name alone indicates the highest appellate court in that state's judiciary at the time.
  - e.g.,"Pa." = Supreme Court of Pennsylvania
  - e.g.,"Me." = Supreme Judicial Court of Maine

== List of cases in 25 U.S. (12 Wheat.) ==
Case Name	Page and year	Opinion of the Court	Concurring opinion(s)	Dissenting opinion(s)	Lower court	Disposition
The Palmyra	1 (1827)	Story	none	none	C.C.D.S.C.	multiple
Martin v. Mott	19 (1827)	Story	none	none	N.Y.	reversed
Clark v. City of Washington	40 (1827)	Marshall	none	none	C.C.D.C.	reversed
Second Bank of the United States v. Dandridge	64 (1827)	Story	none	Marshall	C.C.D. Va.	reversed
Williams v. Norris	117 (1827)	Marshall	none	none	Tenn.	dismissed
Montgomery v. Hernandez	129 (1827)	Trimble	none	none	La.	affirmed
Winn's Heirs v. Jackson	135 (1827)	per curiam	none	none	Ky.	dismissed
Postmaster General v. Early	136 (1827)	Marshall	none	none	C.C.D. Ga.	certification
Jackson v. Chew	153 (1827)	Thompson	none	none	C.C.S.D.N.Y.	affirmed
Armstrong v. Lear	169 (1827)	Story	none	none	C.C.D.C.	affirmed
Rankin v. Scott	177 (1827)	Marshall	none	none	D. Mo.	reversed
United States v. Tillotson	180 (1827)	Story	none	none	C.C.S.D.N.Y.	reversed
Thornton v. Wynn	183 (1827)	Washington	none	none	C.C.D.C.	reversed
Mallow v. Hinde	193 (1827)	Trimble	none	none	C.C.D. Ohio	multiple
Connor v. Featherstone	199 (1827)	Trimble	none	none	C.C.D.W. Tenn.	reversed
Edwards' Lessee v. Darby	206 (1827)	Trimble	none	none	C.C.D.W. Tenn.	reversed
Devereaux v. Marr	212 (1827)	per curiam	none	none	C.C.D.W. Tenn.	dismissed
Ogden v. Saunders	213 (1827)	Johnson	several	several	D. La.	affirmed
Mason v. Haile	370 (1827)	Thompson	none	Washington	C.C.D.R.I.	certification
Columbian Insurance Company v. Catlett	383 (1827)	Story	none	Johnson	C.C.D.C.	multiple
General Insurance Insurance Company v. Ruggles	408 (1827)	Thompson	none	none	C.C.D. Mass.	affirmed
Brown v. Maryland	419 (1827)	Marshall	none	Thompson	C.C.D. Md.	reversed
United States v. Gooding	460 (1827)	Story	none	none	C.C.D. Md.	certification
United States v. Marchant	480 (1827)	Story	none	none	C.C.D. Mass.	certification
United States v. 350 Chests of Tea	486 (1827)	Washington	none	none	C.C.S.D.N.Y.	affirmed
Potter v. Gardner	498 (1827)	Marshall	none	none	C.C.D.R.I.	multiple
United States v. Nicholl	505 (1827)	Trimble	none	none	not indicated	reversed
McGill v. Second Bank of the United States	511 (1827)	Johnson	none	none	C.C.D. Conn.	affirmed
Drummond v. Prestman's Executors	515 (1827)	Johnson	none	none	not indicated	reversed
Harcourt v. Gaillard	523 (1827)	Johnson	none	none	not indicated	affirmed
Henderson v. Poindexter's Lessee	530 (1827)	Marshall	none	none	D. Miss.	affirmed
The Antelope	546 (1827)	Trimble	none	none	C.C.D. Ga.	affirmed
McLemore v. Powell	554 (1827)	Story	none	none	C.C.D.W. Tenn.	affirmed
United States v. Barker	559 (1827)	Marshall	none	none	C.C.E.D. Pa.	affirmed
Parker v. Judges of the Circuit Court of Maryland	561 (1827)	Marshall	none	none	C.C.D. Md.	mandamus denied
Thompson v. Peter	565 (1827)	Marshall	none	none	C.C.D.C.	affirmed
Williams v. Daniel	568 (1827)	Marshall	none	none	C.C.D. Ga.	affirmed
Newman v. Jackson	570 (1827)	Trimble	none	none	C.C.D.C.	affirmed
Dunlap v. Dunlap	574 (1827)	Marshall	none	none	C.C.D. Ohio	affirmed
McConnell v. Town of Lexington	582 (1827)	Marshall	none	none	C.C.D. Ky.	affirmed
Chotard v. Pope	586 (1827)	Johnson	none	none	not indicated	affirmed
Mason v. Matilda	590 (1827)	Johnson	none	none	C.C.D.C.	reversed
Lidderdale's Executors v. Robinson's Executor	594 (1827)	Johnson	none	none	C.C.D. Va.	certification
De la Croix v. Chamberlain	599 (1827)	Trimble	none	none	D. Ala.	affirmed
Davidson v. Taylor	604 (1827)	Marshall	none	none	not indicated	affirmed
Scott v. Shreeve	605 (1827)	Thompson	none	none	C.C.D.C.	affirmed
Ramsay v. Allegre	611 (1827)	Marshall	Johnson	none	C.C.D. Md.	affirmed

== See also ==
- certificate of division
