= Laidlaw v. Organ =

- Supreme Court of the United States

Decided March 15, 1817
- Full case name: Peter Laidlaw and Company v. Hector M. Organ
- Citations: 15 U.S. 178 (more) 2 Wheat. 178; 4 L. Ed. 214; 1817 U.S. LEXIS 396

Case history
- Prior: Error to the District Court for the Louisiana District

Holding
- A party is not obligated to disclose all of the information within its possession with regard to a certain transaction when the other party asks a general question about the party's awareness of issues that might affect the transaction's value.

Court membership
- Chief Justice John Marshall Associate Justices Bushrod Washington · William Johnson; H. Brockholst Livingston · Thomas Todd; Gabriel Duvall · Joseph Story

Case opinion
- Majority: Marshall, joined by unanimous

Laidlaw v. Organ, 15 U.S. (2 Wheat.) 178 (1817), is a case decided by the Supreme Court of the United States that established the rule that buyers need not disclose advantageous information to sellers. This rule should not be confused with either caveat emptor—a rule placing the burden of due diligence on the purchaser of goods—or caveat venditor—the rule that vendor sales come with an implied warranty.

== Facts ==
On December 24, 1814, delegations from the United States and United Kingdom signed the Treaty of Ghent, presumptively ending the War of 1812. At the war's outset, U.K. forces had blockaded major U.S. ports, including New Orleans. In consequence of the blockade, tobacco crops coming down the Mississippi River intended for export amassed in New Orleans, thereby depressing their price by 23 to 33 percent.

On the evening of February 18, 1815, three Americans—Livingston, White, and Shepherd—received news from the British fleet of the war's end. White arranged for the publication of a handbill the following morning beginning at 8 a.m. detailing the news of the treaty. In the meantime, Shepherd informed his brother of the peace, who in turn informed Hector Organ.

Organ had been in negotiations with Francis Girault, a tobacco broker at Laidlaw's firm. Within the hour after publication of the handbill on February 19, Organ finalized a contract with Girault to purchase 111 hogsheads of tobacco (120,000 pounds). When making the contract, Girault had asked Organ if he knew of information that might tend to increase the price of the tobacco. Organ did not disclose any news of the treaty.

With the war's end and the lifting of the blockade, the pent-up tobacco supply in the city would fetch higher global prices and consequently increased in price 30 to 50 percent after news of the treaty broke within the city. The subsequent increase in price represented a substantial loss to Laidlaw and a lucrative windfall for Organ. When Organ appeared on February 20 to take possession of the tobacco, Laidlaw refused delivery.

== Procedural history ==
By February 21, Organ had filed a petition in the United States District Court for the District of Louisiana on grounds of breach of contract. The judge issued a writ of sequestration and ordered Laidlaw to surrender the tobacco into the marshal's possession. The judge also later ordered Organ to post a bond payable to Laidlaw for its expenses should the case go in their favor.

The court tried the petition before a jury on April 20, 1815, resulting in a verdict for the plaintiff, awarding him the sequestered tobacco. During the trial, the judge refused to admit Girault to testify on grounds of incompetency.^{a} Counsel for Laidlaw objected to this. Based on the evidence admitted, the judge charged the jury to find for the plaintiff. Counsel for Laidlaw then entered a bill of exceptions.

== Holding ==
Writing for a unanimous court, Chief Justice Marshall held in a short opinion of 120 words that Organ had no duty to disclose information known exclusively to him about circumstances affecting the price of the commodity he was purchasing. The Court viewed a rule requiring purchasers to disclose such information when it was readily discoverable to the seller as judicially unmanageable. The rule instead was only that neither party imposed upon the other through any statements actively made.

However, the Court also thought the judge erred in directing the jury to find for the plaintiff. The question of whether Organ had imposed upon Girault to Laidlaw's detriment was a question of fact to be decided by the jury. For that reason, the Court vacated the verdict and directed retrial before a new jury—venire facias de novo.

== Significance ==
Laidlaw has been recognized by U.S. legal scholars as a central case in the history of U.S. contract law. It was "one of the first cases to come before the [Supreme] Court involving a contract for future delivery of a commodity." It is also the first case to start to articulate a doctrine of forbidding active concealment.

Laidlaw has been cited by 110 different cases and maintains great importance in U.S. legal scholarship and education (including law school contracts courses). It has also appeared over 100 times in law review articles, appellate court briefs, and other academic materials.

Laidlaw has also faced criticism from an economic perspective on the idea that nondisclosure of information that will shortly become public does not encourage overall efficiency because it merely affects distribution. Earlier disclosure could have resulted in more efficient planting decisions by farmers, and nondisclosure served only to enrich Organ.

== Trivia ==
Organ, the vendee, was represented by Francis Scott Key.

== Quote ==
"[E]ach party must take care not to say or do anything tending to impose upon [i.e. take advantage of] the other" -Marshall

== See also ==
- List of United States Supreme Court cases, volume 15
