= Venire facias =

Legal writ to summon a jury

In law, venire facias (Latin for "may you cause to come"), also venire facias juratores, and often shortened to venire, is a writ directing a sheriff to assemble a jury. Various types are:

- venire facias ad respondendum – "a writ requiring a sheriff to summon a person against whom an indictment for a misdemeanor has been issued," now superseded by the use of warrants.
- venire facias de novo, often shortened to venire de novo – a writ for summoning a new jury panel, or venire, "because of some impropriety or irregularity in the original jury return or verdict such that a judgment cannot be entered on it." This results in a trial de novo. "In substance, the writ is a motion for a new trial, but when the party objects to the verdict because of a procedural error (and not an error on the merits), the form of motion was traditionally for a venire facias de novo." For example, see the 1817 decision of the U.S. Supreme Court in Laidlaw v. Organ (15 U.S. 178): "...the judgment must be reversed, and the cause remanded to the district court of Louisiana, with direction to award a venire facire de novo" (John Marshall).
- venire facias tot matronas – "a writ requiring a sheriff to summon a jury of matrons to execute a writ de ventre inspiciendo."
