= 1824 State of the Union Address =

Speech by US President James Monroe

- Date: December 7, 1824
- Venue: House Chamber, United States Capitol
- Location: Washington, D.C.; 38°53′23″N 77°00′32″W
- Type: State of the Union Address
- Participants: James Monroe; Daniel D. Tompkins; Henry Clay
- Format: Written
- Previous: 1823 State of the Union Address
- Next: 1825 State of the Union Address

The 1824 State of the Union Address was written by James Monroe, the fifth president of the United States. Delivered to the 18th United States Congress on Tuesday, December 7, 1824. James Monroe presided over the Era of Good Feelings. He began with, "The view which I have now to present to you of our affairs, foreign and domestic, realizes the most sanguine anticipations which have been entertained of the public prosperity. If we look to the whole, our growth as a nation continues to be rapid beyond example;" He ended with, "From the present prosperous and happy state I derive a gratification which I can not express. That these blessings may be preserved and perpetuated will be the object of my fervent and unceasing prayers to the Supreme Ruler of the Universe." In the middle of the address, Mr. Monroe said, "There is no object which as a people we can desire which we do not possess or which is not within our reach. Blessed with governments the happiest which the world ever knew, with no distinct orders in society or divided interests in any portion of the vast territory over which their dominion extends, we have every motive to cling together which can animate a virtuous and enlightened people." James Monroe, a founder of his country, predicts that his country will become a world power, and must animate with virtue and enlightenment.

Notably, the President's address contains mention of the Treaty of Ghent and the deliberations around the land boundaries discussed in it. When discussing the expansion of the military, the President noted that Fort Washington, Fort Delaware, and Fort Rigolets would be completed. Additionally, the President announced $5,000 for the exploration of the western frontier by Colonel McRee, Colonel Lee, and Captain Talcott to find a suitable location for a Western armory. At the westernmost fort of the time (Fort Atkinson), the President reported that Colonel Leavenworth put down Arikara tribe incursions against traders in the area.

| Preceded by 1823 State of the Union Address | State of the Union addresses 1824 | Succeeded by 1825 State of the Union Address |
