= 1828 State of the Union Address =

Speech by US President John Quincy Adams

- Date: December 2, 1828
- Venue: House Chamber, United States Capitol
- Location: Washington, D.C.; 38°53′23″N 77°00′32″W
- Type: State of the Union Address
- Participants: John Quincy Adams; John C. Calhoun; Andrew Stevenson
- Format: Written
- Previous: 1827 State of the Union Address
- Next: 1829 State of the Union Address

The 1828 State of the Union Address was written by John Quincy Adams, on Tuesday, December 2, 1828. It was read to both houses of the 20th United States Congress by a clerk on that day.

The president said of the navy:

Arrangements have been made for the preservation of the live oak timber growing on the lands of the United States, and for its reproduction, to supply at future and distant days the waste of that most valuable material for ship building by the great consumption of it yearly for the commercial as well as for the military marine of our country.

Preceded by 1827 State of the Union Address	State of the Union addresses 1828	Succeeded by 1829 State of the Union Address
