= 1825 State of the Union Address =

Speech by US President John Quincy Adams

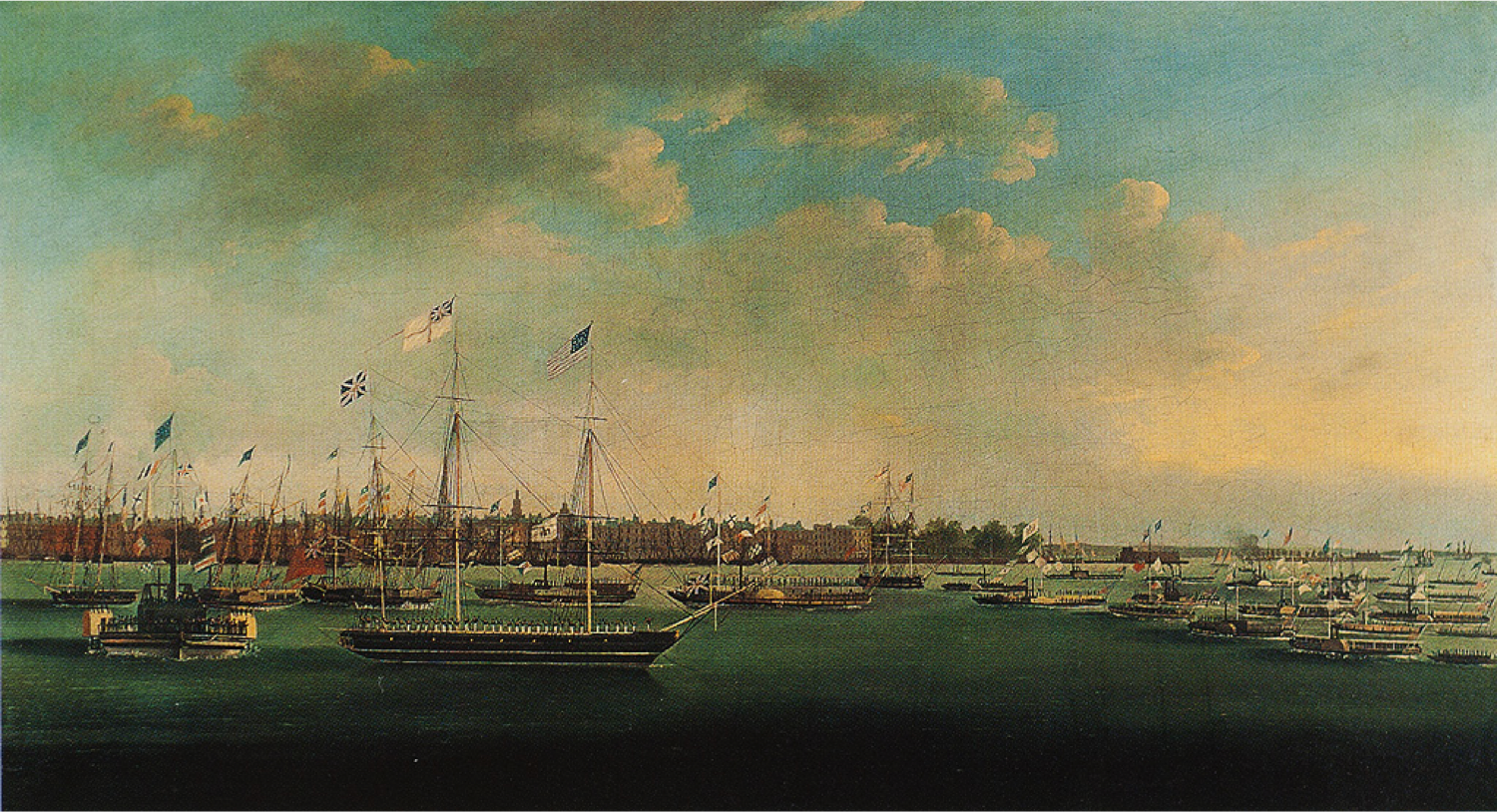
- New York, official celebrations for the opening of the Erie Canal 1825
- Date: December 6, 1825
- Venue: House Chamber, United States Capitol
- Location: Washington, D.C.; 38°53′23″N 77°00′32″W
- Type: State of the Union Address
- Participants: John Quincy Adams; John C. Calhoun; John W. Taylor
- Format: Written
- Previous: 1824 State of the Union Address
- Next: 1826 State of the Union Address

The 1825 State of the Union Address was given by John Quincy Adams, the sixth president of the United States. It was given to the 19th United States Congress, on Tuesday, December 6, 1825. He said, "In taking a general survey of the concerns of our beloved country, with reference to subjects interesting to the common welfare, the first sentiment which impresses itself upon the mind is of gratitude to the Omnipotent Disposer of All Good for the continuance of the signal blessings of His providence, and especially for that health which to an unusual extent has prevailed within our borders, and for that abundance which in the vicissitudes of the seasons has been scattered with profusion over our land." He ended with, "And may He who searches the hearts of the children of men prosper your exertions to secure the blessings of peace and promote the highest welfare of your country."

Notably, the President commented on the work of the West India Squadron of the Navy that was tasked with suppression of piracy and the African slave trade. About this he said, "Captain Warrington and of the officers and men under his command on that trying and perilous service have been crowned with signal success, and are entitled to the approbation of their country."

Preceded by 1824 State of the Union Address	State of the Union addresses 1825	Succeeded by 1826 State of the Union Address
