= 1827 State of the Union Address =

Speech by US President John Quincy Adams

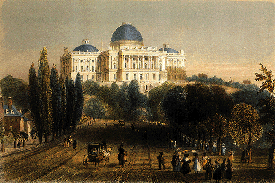
- Date: December 4, 1827
- Venue: House Chamber, United States Capitol
- Location: Washington, D.C.; 38°53′23″N 77°00′32″W
- Type: State of the Union Address
- Participants: John Quincy Adams; John C. Calhoun; Andrew Stevenson
- Format: Written
- Previous: 1826 State of the Union Address
- Next: 1828 State of the Union Address

The 1827 State of the Union Address was written by John Quincy Adams, the sixth president of the United States. It was given on Tuesday, December 4, 1827, to the United States House of Representatives and United States Senate. Adams said, "A revolution of the seasons has nearly been completed since the representatives of the people and States of this Union were last assembled at this place to deliberate and to act upon the common important interests of their constituents." It was given to the 20th United States Congress.

Notably, the President mentions in the address the authorization of various surveys including a canal to connect the bays of Mobile and Pensacola in Florida, a canal to connect the James and Great Kenhawa Rivers, and continuation of the construction of the National Road.

Preceded by 1826 State of the Union Address	State of the Union addresses 1827	Succeeded by 1828 State of the Union Address
