= 1817 State of the Union Address =

Speech by US President James Monroe

- Date: December 2, 1817
- Venue: House Chamber, United States Capitol
- Location: Washington, D.C.; 38°53′23″N 77°00′32″W
- Type: State of the Union Address
- Participants: James Monroe; Daniel D. Tompkins; Henry Clay
- Format: Written
- Previous: 1816 State of the Union Address
- Next: 1818 State of the Union Address

The 1817 State of the Union Address was delivered by the fifth president of the United States, James Monroe, on December 2, 1817. This was Monroe's first annual message to the 15th United States Congress and reflected on the nation's prosperity following the War of 1812.

== Content of speech ==
=== Agriculture and peace ===
Monroe began by celebrating the country's agricultural abundance, expanding commerce, and strong public credit. He emphasized the benefits of peace and economic recovery, noting that local rivalries were subsiding in favor of a broader, unified national perspective. Monroe called for gratitude to Providence for the nation's blessings and for strength to preserve its freedoms.

=== Foreign affairs and smuggling ===
Monroe discussed foreign relations, highlighting a naval disarmament agreement between the U.S. and Great Britain on the Great Lakes, which reduced the risk of conflict in the region. He also mentioned the ongoing negotiations with Spain regarding territorial disputes and compensation for American spoliation claims, expressing hope for a peaceful resolution.

Monroe addressed the issue of independence movements in Spanish America, reaffirming U.S. neutrality in the conflict between Spain and its colonies while acknowledging that American citizens had suffered during the turmoil. He mentioned concerns about illegal activities, such as slave smuggling and privateering, arising from unauthorized foreign expeditions in Florida and Texas, emphasizing the need to protect U.S. interests.

=== Domestic matters ===
Monroe expressed optimism about domestic progress, noting that public revenue was exceeding expectations, allowing for the repayment of the national debt and investment in national defense. He also emphasized the importance of internal improvements, such as roads and canals, to connect the country and promote economic growth.

=== Closing ===
In closing, Monroe called for attention to the needs of veterans from the American Revolutionary War, urging Congress to provide for any surviving veterans who were in distress. He also recommended the repeal of internal taxes, as the government's revenue from tariffs and land sales was sufficient to cover its expenses.

Preceded by 1816 State of the Union Address	State of the Union addresses 1817	Succeeded by 1818 State of the Union Address
