= 1820 State of the Union Address =

Speech by US President James Monroe

- Date: November 14, 1820
- Venue: House Chamber, United States Capitol
- Location: Washington, D.C.; 38°53′23″N 77°00′32″W
- Type: State of the Union Address
- Participants: James Monroe; Daniel D. Tompkins
- Format: Written
- Previous: 1819 State of the Union Address
- Next: 1821 State of the Union Address

The 1820 State of the Union Address was delivered by the fifth president of the United States James Monroe to the 16th United States Congress on November 14, 1820.

== Description ==
In his address, Monroe reflected on the nation's overall prosperity despite some economic pressures and difficulties. He acknowledged the impact of international events, particularly the upheavals in Europe and the transition from war to peace, which had affected American commerce and industry. Monroe urged vigilance and continued effort to preserve the nation's stability and prosperity, noting the importance of lessons learned from these challenges.

Monroe highlighted ongoing tensions with Spain over the ratification of the Adams–Onís Treaty, which had yet to be finalized. He expressed concerns about efforts to use parts of Florida for smuggling goods into the United States but remained hopeful that an amicable resolution would be reached.

Monroe also discussed relations with Great Britain and France, particularly trade issues. He noted that negotiations with France had encountered difficulties, and a French minister was expected to visit Washington to continue discussions. In the meantime, he proposed extending relief to French ships that had entered U.S. ports before the implementation of new tonnage duties.

On the domestic front, Monroe emphasized the nation's strong financial standing, with a significant reduction of the national debt. The public debt had been reduced by over $66 million since 1815, and despite economic difficulties, the government had maintained its expenditures and made progress on important infrastructure projects, such as fortifications along the coast.

Monroe also reported on efforts to promote the civilization of Native American tribes through trade and settlement programs, noting the importance of maintaining peace with the tribes while encouraging their gradual integration into American society. Additionally, he addressed naval operations, including the suppression of piracy and the slave trade, particularly along the Barbary Coast and in the Atlantic.

In conclusion, Monroe celebrated the nation's progress and urged continued vigilance in both foreign and domestic affairs to preserve the Union's prosperity and security.

Preceded by 1819 State of the Union Address	State of the Union addresses 1820	Succeeded by 1821 State of the Union Address
