= Brown v. Maryland =

- Supreme Court of the United States

Decided March, 1827
- Full case name: Brown v. State of Maryland
- Citations: 25 U.S. 419 (more) 12 Wheat. 419; 6 L. Ed. 678

Holding
- Maryland’s tax on imports interferes with the federal government's control of commerce with foreign nations.

Court membership
- Chief Justice John Marshall Associate Justices Bushrod Washington · William Johnson; Gabriel Duvall · Joseph Story; Smith Thompson · Robert Trimble

Case opinions
- Majority: Marshall, joined by Washington, Duvall, Story, Johnson, Trimble
- Dissent: Thompson

Laws applied
- Import-Export Clause, Commerce Clause

Brown v. Maryland, 25 U.S. (12 Wheat.) 419 (1827), was a significant United States Supreme Court case which interpreted the Import-Export and Commerce Clauses of the U.S. Constitution to prohibit discriminatory taxation by states against imported items after importation, rather than only at the time of importation. The state of Maryland passed a law requiring importers of foreign goods to obtain a license for selling their products. Brown was charged under this law and appealed. It was the first case in which the U.S. Supreme Court construed the Import-Export Clause. Chief Justice John Marshall delivered the opinion of the court, ruling that Maryland's statute violated the Import-Export and Commerce Clauses and the federal law was supreme. He alleged that the power of a state to tax goods did not apply if they remained in their "original package". A license tax on the importer was essentially the same as a tax on an import itself. Despite arguing the case for Maryland, future chief justice Roger Taney admitted that the case was correctly decided.

== Background ==
In 1821, the Maryland legislature passed a law which required anyone who sold imported items to obtain a license, costing fifty dollars (approximately $1076 in 2016 dollars), before the imported goods could be legally sold in the state. The plaintiff was charged with importing one package of dry goods and selling it without a license. Counsel for the plaintiff contended that this violated two clauses of the U.S. Constitution: the Import-Export Clause and the Commerce Clause.

The Import Export Clause (Article I, Section 10, Clause 2) states that:

No State shall, without the Consent of the Congress, lay any Imposts or Duties on Imports or Exports, except what may be absolutely necessary for executing it's [sic] inspection Laws: and the net Produce of all Duties and Imposts, laid by any State on Imports or Exports, shall be for the Use of the Treasury of the United States; and all such Laws shall be subject to the Revision and Controul of the Congress.

The Commerce Clause (Article I, Section 8, Clause 3) states that:

The Congress shall have Power [...] To regulate Commerce with foreign Nations, and among the several States, and with the Indian Tribes[.]

Both the City Court of Baltimore and, on appeal, the Court of Appeals of Maryland upheld the charges against Brown for violating an act of the Maryland legislature. The U.S. Supreme Court accepted the case to determine "whether the legislature of a state can constitutionally require the importer of foreign articles to take out a license from the state before he shall be permitted to sell a bale or package so imported."

== Court's opinion ==
Chief Justice John Marshall, who wrote the Court's opinion

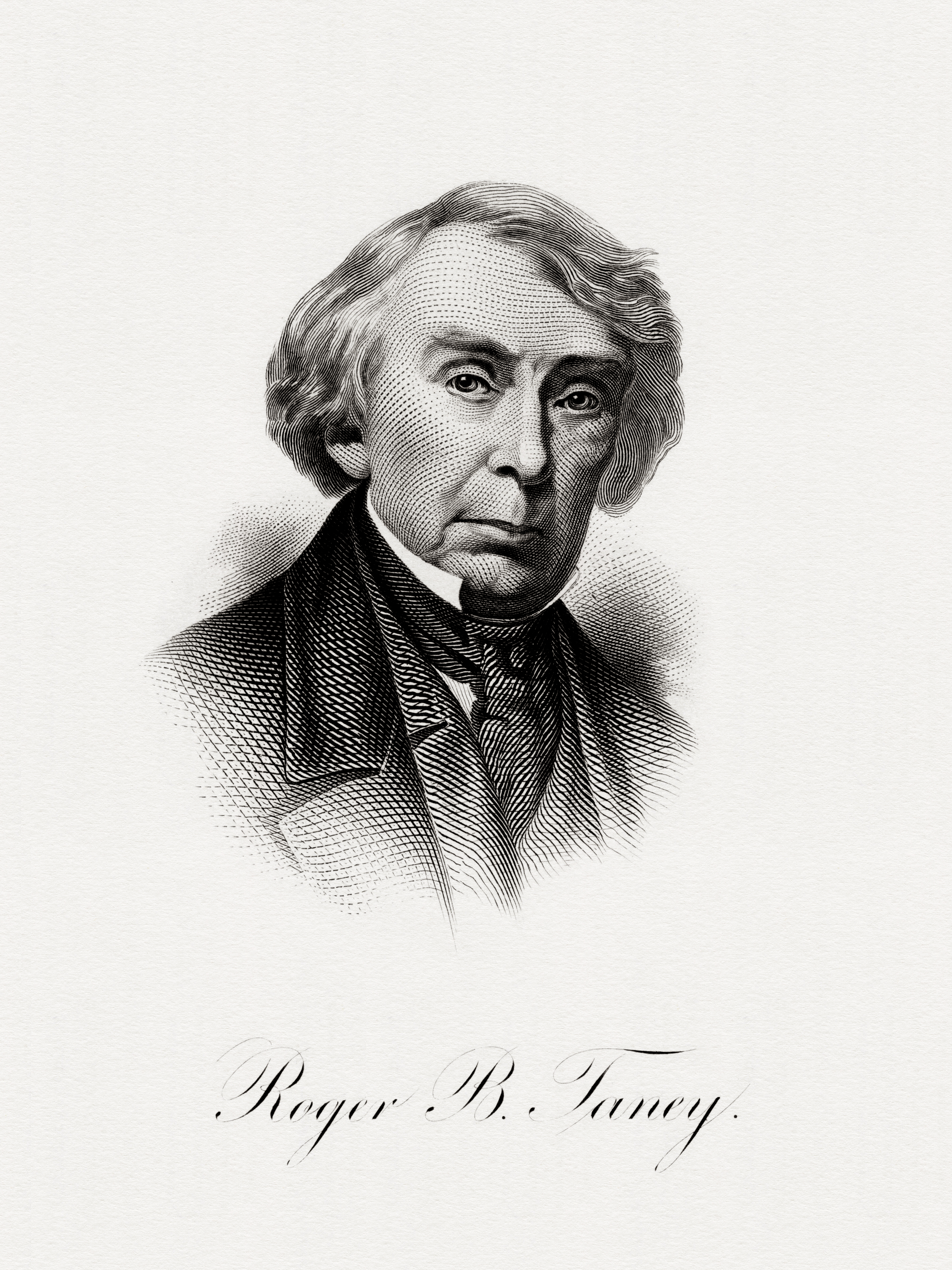
Maryland's attorney Roger Taney, who would later become Marshall's successor as Chief Justice in 1835

Chief Justice John Marshall delivered the majority opinion. He summarized the question at issue by stating that the case "depends entirely on the question whether the legislature of a state can constitutionally require the importer of foreign articles to take out a license from the state before he shall be permitted to sell a bale or package so imported."

=== Import-Export Clause ===
The Import-Export Clause had not previously been construed by the U.S. Supreme Court. Marshall began with a lexicographical analysis of the Import-Export Clause:

An impost, or duty on imports is a custom or a tax levied on articles brought into a country, and is most usually secured before the importer is allowed to exercise his rights of ownership over them, because evasions of the law can be prevented more certainly by executing it while the articles are in its custody. It would not, however, be less an impost or duty on the articles, if it were to be levied on them after they were landed. ... What, then, are "imports?" The lexicons inform us they are "things imported." If we appeal to usage for the meaning of the word, we shall receive the same answer. They are the articles themselves which are brought into the country. "A duty on imports," then, is not merely a duty on the act of importation, but is a duty on the thing imported. It is not, taken in its literal sense, confined to a duty levied while the article is entering the country, but extends to a duty levied after it has entered the country.

The Import-Export Clause has an exception for state inspection laws. Since state inspections were carried out on land, for both imports and exports, a "tax or duty of inspection" was "frequently, if not always, paid for service performed on land" once the imported item was within the country. Marshall thus concluded that "th[e] exception in favor of duties for the support of inspection laws goes far in proving that the framers of the Constitution classed taxes of a similar character with those imposed for the purposes of inspection, with duties on imports and exports, and supposed them to be prohibited." However, he found that this narrow view of the subject was not enough to strike down the Maryland tax on importers and proceeded to examine the motivation of the Founders in including the Import-Export tax and its role in the federal framework of the Constitution.

Imposts and duties on imports and exports was a subject given solely to Congress, "plainly because, in the general opinion, the interest of all would be best promoted by placing that whole subject under the control of Congress." Regardless of whether that power was to prevent state taxation from disrupting harmony between the states, prevent states from hindering uniform trade relations between the US and foreign nations, or reserve this source of revenue solely to the government, "it is plain that the object would be as completely defeated by a power to tax the article in the hands of the importer the instant it was landed as by a power to tax it while entering the port. There is no difference in effect between a power to prohibit the sale of an article and a power to prohibit its introduction into the country. ... No goods would be imported if none could be sold." It was not relevant how small or large the tax was or whether states would act in a manner injurious to their commercial interests, as "it cannot be conceded that each [state] would respect the interests of others." Furthermore, if the major importing states levied taxes on imports that were then transported to other states, the latter would likely impose countervailing measures.

Marshall then addresses an issue that Maryland had argued "with great reason": that prohibiting taxation of imports would greatly interfere in the power of taxation that is "essential" to the states. Maryland insisted that the point when the prohibition on taxation ends should be the time of importation, to which Marshall responded:

It may be conceded that the words of the prohibition ought not to be pressed to their utmost extent; that in our complex system, the object of the powers conferred on the government of the Union, and the nature of the often conflicting powers which remain in the states, must always be taken into view, and may aid in expounding the words of any particular clause. But while we admit that sound principles of construction ought to restrain all courts from carrying the words of the prohibition beyond the object the Constitution is intended to secure, that there must be a point of time when the prohibition ceases and the power of the state to tax commences, we cannot admit that this point of time is the instant that the articles enter the country. It is, we think, obvious that this construction would defeat the prohibition. The constitutional prohibition on the states to lay a duty on imports, a prohibition which a vast majority of them must feel an interest in preserving, may certainly come in conflict with their acknowledged power to tax persons and property within their territory. The power and the restriction on it, though quite distinguishable when they do not approach each other, may yet, like the intervening colors between white and black, approach so nearly as to perplex the understanding, as colors perplex the vision in marking the distinction between them. Yet the distinction exists and must be marked as the cases arise. Till they do arise, it might be premature to state any rule as being universal in its application. It is sufficient for the present to say generally that when the importer has so acted upon the thing imported that it has become incorporated and mixed up with the mass of property in the country, it has perhaps lost its distinctive character as an import and has become subject to the taxing power of the state; but while remaining the property of the importer in his warehouse in the original form or package in which it was imported, a tax upon it is too plainly a duty on imports to escape the prohibition in the Constitution.

The plaintiffs' attorney argued that the payment of import duties to the federal government necessarily conferred on importers the right to sell the imports. Maryland argued that such a reading would allow importers to "exert that right when, where, and as [they] please[]" or allow them to use the imported items for personal use and thus obtain valuable items not subject to household excise taxes.

=== Commerce Clause ===
Marshall began this analysis by noting that "[t]he oppressed and degraded state of commerce previous to the adoption of the Constitution can scarcely be forgotten." Although Congress could make treaties with foreign nations, prior to the adoption of the federal Constitution, the states regulated foreign commerce in their own interests and Congress could not effectively enforce treaty obligations on the states. Therefore, it is unsurprising that Congress' power under the Commerce Clause "should be as extensive as the mischief and should comprehend all foreign commerce and all commerce among the states." The extent of Congress' Commerce Clause power was resolved in Gibbons v. Ogden, 22 U.S. (9 Wheat.) 1 (1824), which determined that it does not end at a state's border but extends to commerce within a state "must be capable of authorizing the sale of those articles which it introduces." "Sale is the object of importation", therefore, "Congress has a right not only to authorize importation, but to authorize the importer to sell." Although Maryland's tax was on the importer rather than the imports, it was "too obvious for controversy" that such a tax interferes with Congress' ability to regulate commerce.

The opinion concluded by noting: "It may be proper to add that we suppose the principles laid down in this case to apply equally to importations from a sister state. We do not mean to give any opinion on a tax discriminating between foreign and domestic articles."

== Legacy ==
Twenty years after the Brown decision, Roger Taney, who had succeeded Marshall as Chief Justice of the United States in 1836, remarked on the case and the wisdom of Marshall's decision:

I argued the case in behalf of the state, and endeavored to maintain that the law of Maryland, which required the importer as well as other dealers to take out a license before he could sell, and for which he was to pay a certain sum to the state, was valid and constitutional, and certainly I at that time persuaded myself that I was right, and thought the decision of the Court restricted the powers of the state more than a sound construction of the Constitution of the United States would warrant. But further and more mature reflection has convinced me that the rule laid down by the Supreme Court is a just and safe one, and perhaps the best that could have been adopted for preserving the right of the United States on the one hand, and of the states on the other, and preventing collision between them. The question, I have already said, was a very difficult one for the judicial mind. In the nature of things, the line of division is in some degree vague and indefinite, and I do not see how it could be drawn more accurately and correctly, or more in harmony with the obvious intention and objected of this provision in the Constitution.

In Brown v. Maryland, Chief Justice Marshall remarked on the applicability of the Import-Export Clause to interstate commerce, remarking that "we suppose the principles laid down in this case, to apply equally to importations from a sister State." In 1860, Chief Justice Taney, wrote the Supreme Court's opinion in Almy v. California, which found a tax on a bill of lading for gold dust exported from California to New York violated the Import Export Clause. "We think this case cannot be distinguished from that of Brown v. Maryland," he wrote, concluding that "the state tax in question is a duty upon the export of gold and silver, and consequently repugnant to the [Import-Export Clause]." In 1869, however, the Supreme Court determined that the Import-Export Clause applied only to foreign trade and not trade between the states.

In Low v. Austin, 80 U.S. 29 (1872), the Supreme Court was given the question of "whether imported merchandise, upon which the duties and charges at the custom-house have been paid, is subject to State taxation, whilst remaining in the original cases, unbroken and unsold, in the hands of the importer." The court, drawing on Brown and the opinion of Chief Justice Taney in the License Cases, 46 U.S. 504 (1847), decided that:

[T]he goods imported do not lose their character as imports, and become incorporated into the mass of property of the State, until they have passed from the control of the importer or been broken up by him from their original cases. Whilst retaining their character as imports, a tax upon them, in any shape, is within the constitutional prohibition. The question is not as to the extent of the tax, or its equality with respect to taxes on other property, but as to the power of the State to levy any tax.

This doctrine, which became known as the "original package doctrine", would define the interpretation of the Import-Export Clause for over a century until the U.S. Supreme Court redefined its analysis of the Import-Export Clause in Michelin Tire Corp. v. Wages, 423 U.S. 276 (1976). In Michelin, the U.S. Supreme Court launched a sua sponte investigation of the meaning and purpose of the Import-Export Clause, summarizing it thusly:

The Framers of the Constitution thus sought to alleviate three main concerns by committing sole power to lay imposts and duties on imports in the Federal Government, with no concurrent state power: the Federal Government must speak with one voice when regulating commercial relations with foreign governments, and tariffs, which might affect foreign relations, could not be implemented by the States consistently with that exclusive power; import revenues were to be the major source of revenue of the Federal Government, and should not be diverted to the States; and harmony among the States might be disturbed unless seaboard States, with their crucial ports of entry, were prohibited from levying taxes on citizens of other States by taxing goods merely flowing through their ports to the other States not situated as favorably geographically.

— Michelin Tire Corp. v. Wages, 423 U.S. at 285–286

The Michelin Court made a lengthy and thorough analysis of the Brown opinion and how it was misread in Low v. Austin, which "[held] that the Court in Brown included nondiscriminatory ad valorem property taxes among prohibited 'imposts' or 'duties.'"

== See also ==
- List of United States Supreme Court cases, volume 25
- Peterswald v Bartley - seminal case of the High Court of Australia that analyzed Brown v. Maryland when interpreting "duties of excise" in a provision of Australia's Constitution similar to the Import-Export Clause
