= 1822 State of the Union Address =

Speech by US President James Monroe

- Date: December 3, 1822
- Venue: House Chamber, United States Capitol
- Location: Washington, D.C.; 38°53′23″N 77°00′32″W
- Type: State of the Union Address
- Participants: James Monroe; Daniel D. Tompkins; Philip P. Barbour
- Format: Written
- Previous: 1821 State of the Union Address
- Next: 1823 State of the Union Address

The 1822 State of the Union Address was delivered by the fifth president of the United States James Monroe to the 17th United States Congress on December 3, 1822.

== Description ==
In his 1822 State of the Union message, American President James Monroe focused on key issues of commerce, foreign relations, and internal improvements, with a general tone of satisfaction over the progress of the nation. He noted that the United States maintained peaceful relations with all nations, and recent treaties and conventions, including one with France and negotiations with Great Britain, were improving commercial ties.

Monroe announced a convention of navigation and commerce between the U.S. and France that had been concluded in June, as well as the removal of restrictions on trade with British colonies in the West Indies. Both developments were viewed as steps toward more equitable and mutually beneficial trade relationships. Monroe sought the Senate's ratification of the convention and stressed the importance of continuing negotiations to resolve lingering disputes with these major powers.

Monroe discussed the fiscal health of the country, reporting that the Treasury was in a strong position with receipts exceeding expenditures, and detailed the progress made in paying down public debt. He highlighted the military and naval establishments, emphasizing the need for their continued efficiency and readiness, especially in combating piracy in the West Indies and maintaining squadrons in the Mediterranean and Pacific to protect U.S. interests.

In addition to foreign policy and military matters, Monroe addressed domestic concerns, including the ongoing need for internal improvements such as roads and canals. He reaffirmed his belief that Congress did not have constitutional authority to undertake such projects without an amendment, though he expressed support for maintaining existing infrastructure like the Cumberland Road.

Monroe expressed hope for a resolution to the war between Spain and its former colonies in Latin America, maintaining the U.S. policy of neutrality while offering sympathy for their independence movements. He also touched on broader international issues, including unrest in Europe and the ongoing struggle for Greek independence, noting the widespread sympathy for the Greeks among the American public.

In concluding, Monroe reiterated the need for the United States to remain vigilant in its defense preparations, arguing that while the nation desired peace, it must always be prepared to defend itself against potential threats.

Preceded by 1821 State of the Union Address	State of the Union addresses 1822	Succeeded by 1823 State of the Union Address
