= 1821 State of the Union Address =

Speech by US President James Monroe

- Date: December 3, 1821
- Venue: House Chamber, United States Capitol
- Location: Washington, D.C.; 38°53′23″N 77°00′32″W
- Type: State of the Union Address
- Participants: James Monroe; Daniel D. Tompkins
- Format: Written
- Previous: 1820 State of the Union Address
- Next: 1822 State of the Union Address

The 1821 State of the Union Address was delivered by the fifth president of the United States James Monroe to the 17th United States Congress on December 3, 1821.

== Description ==
=== Economic issues ===
In his 1821 State of the Union message, American President James Monroe reported that the country was in a state of general prosperity, with peace maintained in foreign relations and domestic laws operating effectively. He noted the nation's steady progress under a government directed by the will of the people, expressing satisfaction with the results of U.S. policy both internally and in foreign affairs. In domestic affairs, Monroe highlighted the nation's financial health, reporting that public revenue had improved after a decline in earlier years. He noted that the public debt had increased slightly but remained manageable, and he anticipated continued economic recovery. Monroe also discussed the importance of domestic manufacturing and its role in making the U.S. less dependent on foreign imports, suggesting that additional tariffs might be necessary to protect these growing industries.

One key focus of the address was the nation's commercial policies, particularly the ongoing challenges in negotiating trade agreements with foreign powers. Monroe emphasized the 1815 act that repealed discriminatory duties on foreign vessels, which had been proposed to foster reciprocal trade arrangements with other nations.

=== Foreign affairs ===
He expressed disappointment that negotiations with France had not yielded favorable results, especially regarding the interpretation of the 1803 Louisiana Purchase treaty and recent trade disputes.

Monroe also addressed the progress in the implementation of the Adams–Onís Treaty with Spain, which had ceded Florida to the United States. He noted that while possession of Florida had been transferred, Spain had not yet fully complied with some stipulations, particularly the delivery of important documents related to land and property claims.

=== Defense ===
Monroe detailed the nation's defense efforts, including fortification construction along the coasts and the continued expansion of the Navy. He emphasized the need to maintain naval forces in the Mediterranean and Pacific to protect American commerce from piracy and other threats. Additionally, he addressed the ongoing suppression of the slave trade, reporting success in preventing American citizens from engaging in the trade under U.S. flags.

=== Conclusion ===
In conclusion, Monroe expressed gratitude for the nation's blessings and called for continued vigilance in safeguarding its prosperity and independence.

| Preceded by 1820 State of the Union Address | State of the Union addresses 1821 | Succeeded by 1822 State of the Union Address |
