= 1826 State of the Union Address =

Speech by US President John Quincy Adams

- Date: December 5, 1826
- Venue: House Chamber, United States Capitol
- Location: Washington, D.C.; 38°53′23″N 77°00′32″W
- Type: State of the Union Address
- Participants: John Quincy Adams; John C. Calhoun; John W. Taylor
- Format: Written
- Previous: 1825 State of the Union Address
- Next: 1827 State of the Union Address

The 1826 State of the Union Address was delivered by the sixth president of the United States, John Quincy Adams, on December 5, 1826, to the 19th United States Congress. Adams began by noting the prosperity and peace that the nation enjoyed, emphasizing the increase in population, wealth, and national resources. He expressed gratitude for the nation’s overall well-being, stating that "we continue to be highly favored in all the elements which contribute to individual comfort and national prosperity."

Adams highlighted several key foreign policy issues, including the United States' relationship with Russia following the death of Emperor Alexander I. He reassured Congress that the new Emperor, Nicholas I of Russia, maintained the same friendly relations toward the U.S. Adams also discussed trade relations with France, particularly improvements in the commerce and navigation agreement with France, while expressing disappointment in the lack of progress regarding compensation claims by U.S. citizens against the French government.

One of the most critical topics Adams addressed was the ongoing trade dispute with Great Britain regarding the American colonies. He lamented the failure of negotiations over the commercial intercourse between the United States and British colonies, and explained that British colonial ports had been reopened under new conditions that did not align with U.S. interests. He recommended that Congress regulate or even restrict trade in response, while reaffirming a desire for amicable relations.

Domestically, Adams discussed the national debt, reporting that $50 million of the debt had been reduced since 1817. He emphasized fiscal responsibility, advocating for vigilance in the management of revenue and public expenditures. Adams also noted the continued progress in infrastructure, including military fortifications, canals, and roads. He underscored the importance of internal improvements and the construction of roads and canals as essential for national growth and defense.

Adams concluded with a reflection on the significance of the nation’s 50th anniversary of independence, particularly noting the deaths of Thomas Jefferson and John Adams on July 4, 1826. He praised their contributions to the nation and their legacies, highlighting the remarkable progress the United States had made since its founding. This celebration of American ideals and achievements was a fitting tribute to the country's continued evolution.

| Preceded by 1825 State of the Union Address | State of the Union addresses 1826 | Succeeded by 1827 State of the Union Address |
