= 1819 State of the Union Address =

Speech by US President James Monroe

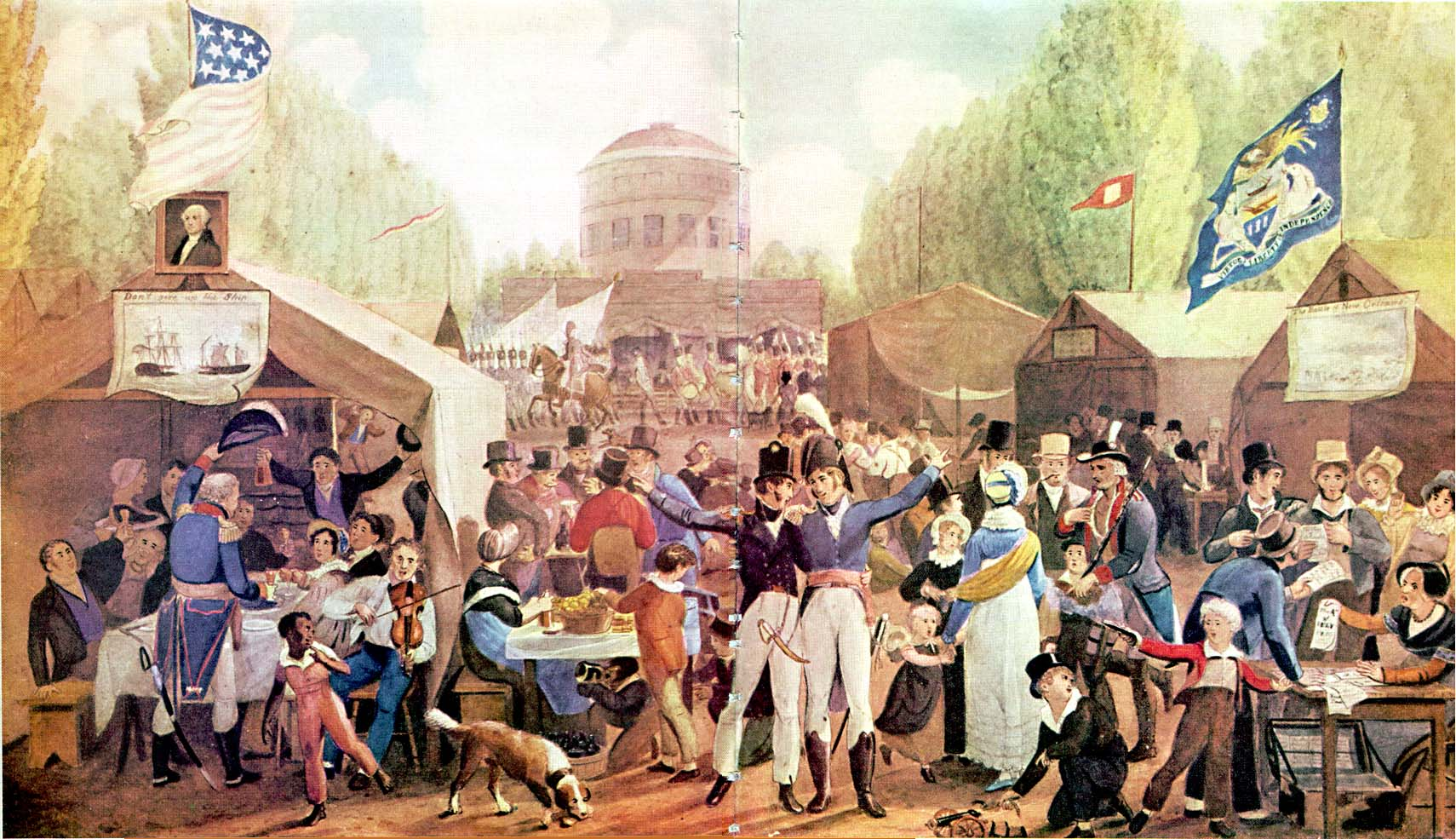
- A Depiction of The Celebrations of July 4th 1819
- Date: December 7, 1819
- Venue: House Chamber, United States Capitol
- Location: Washington, D.C.; 38°53′23″N 77°00′32″W
- Type: State of the Union Address
- Participants: James Monroe; Daniel D. Tompkins; Henry Clay
- Format: Written
- Previous: 1818 State of the Union Address
- Next: 1820 State of the Union Address

The 1819 State of the Union Address was delivered by the fifth president of the United States James Monroe to the 16th United States Congress on December 7, 1819.

== Description ==
In this address, Monroe began by congratulating Congress on the progress of public building projects that allowed the body to meet once again in the Capitol. He also acknowledged the challenges the country had faced during the year, including outbreaks of illness in major cities, a severe drought in the Middle and Western States, and financial difficulties that affected several banks. Nonetheless, he expressed optimism, noting that the health crisis had subsided, and the agricultural yield, though lower than usual, was sufficient for both domestic consumption and export.

Monroe also discussed the troubled relationship with Spain regarding the ratification of the Adams–Onís Treaty, which had been delayed by Spain. This treaty, signed in 1819, was intended to resolve territorial disputes and included Spain's cession of Florida to the United States. Monroe expressed frustration that despite expectations of prompt ratification, Spain had withheld it, citing concerns over land grants and an alleged expedition from the U.S. against Texas. Monroe categorically denied these allegations, emphasizing the United States' commitment to neutrality and its efforts to suppress unlawful expeditions.

On the domestic front, Monroe noted the economic hardships caused by a decline in the value of agricultural goods and banking failures, which affected both commerce and manufacturing. Despite these challenges, the Treasury had a surplus of more than $2.5 million by September, and the national revenue from customs was expected to exceed $23 million for the year.

In terms of national defense, Monroe reported progress in fortifying coastal defenses and constructing naval ships. He also mentioned efforts to maintain peace with Native American tribes and to protect American commerce from piracy, especially in the Mediterranean and the Pacific. Additionally, Monroe addressed the ongoing suppression of the slave trade, praising recent legislation and naval efforts to enforce the ban.

Monroe concluded by reflecting on the independence movements in South America, noting that nations like Buenos Aires and Chile had made significant progress in their struggles for independence from Spain. While maintaining a stance of neutrality, Monroe hinted at the United States' sympathetic view of these movements.

Preceded by 1818 State of the Union Address	State of the Union addresses 1819	Succeeded by 1820 State of the Union Address
