= 1818 State of the Union Address =

Speech by US President James Monroe

- Date: November 16, 1818
- Venue: House Chamber, United States Capitol
- Location: Washington, D.C.; 38°53′23″N 77°00′32″W
- Type: State of the Union Address
- Participants: James Monroe; Daniel D. Tompkins; Henry Clay
- Format: Written
- Previous: 1817 State of the Union Address
- Next: 1819 State of the Union Address

The 1818 State of the Union Address was delivered by the fifth president of the United States James Monroe to the 15th United States Congress on November 16, 1818. In this address, Monroe highlighted the prosperity the United States was experiencing, noting abundant harvests, flourishing commerce, and a surplus in revenue. He attributed these benefits to providence, stating: "For these inestimable blessings we can not but be grateful to that Providence which watches over the destiny of nations."

== Foreign relations ==
A central theme of the address was foreign relations, particularly with Great Britain and Spain. Monroe explained ongoing negotiations with Britain concerning a commercial convention, which aimed to regulate trade between the two nations. He also addressed lingering tensions with Spain, especially regarding the unrest in Florida. Monroe emphasized that Spain's weak governance in Florida had allowed the region to become a haven for "adventurers" and hostile Seminole tribes, contributing to the outbreak of the First Seminole War.

Monroe justified the U.S. military's incursion into Florida, led by General Andrew Jackson, by stating: "The right of self-defense never ceases," and clarified that the United States was not engaging in hostilities against Spain itself. Rather, the intervention was necessary to suppress lawlessness in the region and protect American citizens.

== Domestic issues ==
On domestic issues, Monroe praised the economic strength of the nation, noting that government revenues had exceeded expectations, and public land sales were at record highs. He also discussed the need to continue fortifying coastal defenses and expanding infrastructure in the western territories. Moreover, Monroe advocated for policies aimed at the "civilization" of Native American tribes, suggesting that their integration into American society was essential for their survival.

In closing, Monroe expressed gratitude for the nation's blessings and urged Congress to offer "our most grateful acknowledgments to the Divine Author of All Good."

Preceded by 1817 State of the Union Address	State of the Union addresses 1818	Succeeded by 1819 State of the Union Address
