= 1823 State of the Union Address =

Speech by US president James Monroe

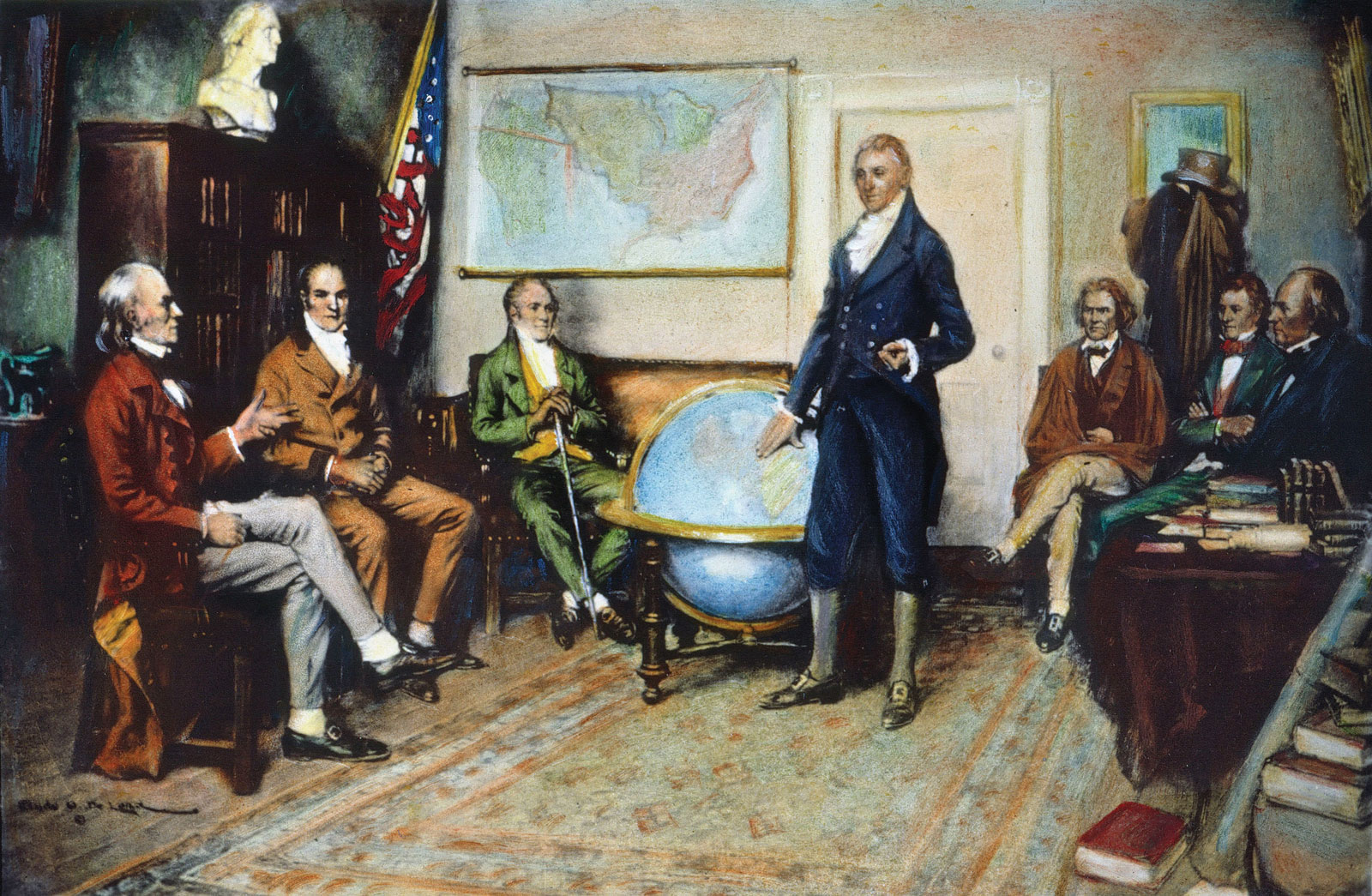
- U.S. president James Monroe presides over a cabinet meeting in 1823
- Date: December 2, 1823; 202 years ago
- Venue: House Chamber, United States Capitol
- Location: Washington, D.C.; 38°53′23″N 77°00′32″W
- Type: State of the Union Address
- Participants: James Monroe; Daniel D. Tompkins; Henry Clay
- Format: Written
- Previous: 1822 State of the Union Address
- Next: 1824 State of the Union Address

The 1823 State of the Union Address was delivered by the fifth president of the United States James Monroe to the 18th United States Congress on December 2, 1823.

== Description ==
In his 1823 State of the Union message, United States president James Monroe addressed several important domestic and foreign policy matters, but the most notable aspect of this address was the articulation of what became known as the Monroe Doctrine. In this doctrine, Monroe warned European powers against further colonization in the Americas, stating, "the American continents... are henceforth not to be considered as subjects for future colonization by any European powers."

Monroe's message emphasized the need for neutrality and non-interference in European wars, but he stressed that any European intervention in the affairs of newly independent nations in the Americas would be seen as a threat to the peace and safety of the United States. This policy was framed in response to concerns about European powers, particularly Spain and the Holy Alliance, attempting to reassert control over Latin American countries that had recently declared their independence.

In addition to foreign policy, Monroe discussed domestic issues such as the nation's strong financial position. He reported that the national debt was steadily decreasing and that the Treasury had a surplus of nearly $9 million. He also addressed the military, noting that the Army was in good condition and progress was being made on the construction of fortifications.

Monroe reaffirmed the U.S. commitment to suppressing the slave trade and combating piracy, particularly in the Caribbean. He also expressed support for internal improvements, such as the construction of roads and canals, which he believed were essential for national development. He specifically mentioned the potential for a canal connecting the Chesapeake Bay and the Ohio River.

Monroe's address marked a pivotal moment in U.S. foreign policy, with the Monroe Doctrine becoming a cornerstone of American diplomacy in the Western Hemisphere for generations.

Preceded by 1822 State of the Union Address	State of the Union addresses 1823	Succeeded by 1824 State of the Union Address
