= Ogden v. Saunders =

- Supreme Court of the United States

Argued January 18–21; March 10, 1827 Decided March 13, 1827
- Full case name: Ogden, Plaintiff in Error v. Saunders, Defendant in Error
- Citations: 25 U.S. 213 (more) 12 Wheat. 213; 6 L. Ed. 606; 1827 U.S. LEXIS 394

Case history
- Prior: Court rules for Ogden; brought before Supreme Court on writ of error

Holding
- New York law on bankruptcy did not violate the Obligation of Contracts Clause of the United States Constitution.

Court membership
- Chief Justice John Marshall Associate Justices Bushrod Washington · William Johnson; Gabriel Duvall · Joseph Story; Smith Thompson · Robert Trimble

Case opinions
- Majority: Johnson
- Concur/dissent: Washington
- Concur/dissent: Thompson
- Concur/dissent: Trimble
- Concur/dissent: Marshall, joined by Duvall, Story

Laws applied
- Obligation of Contracts Clause

Ogden v. Saunders, 25 U.S. 213 (1827), was a United States Supreme Court case that determined the scope of a bankruptcy law in relation to a clause of the Constitution of the United States. It is notable for its era in producing multiple opinions from the justices. Justice William Johnson delivered the majority opinion. Chief Justice John Marshall, Justice Gabriel Duvall, and Justice Joseph Story concurred in part and dissented in part to the Court's judgment, while Justices Bushrod Washington, Smith Thompson, and Robert Trimble dissented.

== Parties ==
Saunders was a citizen of Kentucky demanding payment in accordance with a contract. Ogden was a citizen of Louisiana who lived in New York at the signing of the contract and claimed bankruptcy as a defense under a New York bankruptcy law passed in 1801.

Saunders was represented by Daniel Webster, among others. Webster argued to the Court that the clause of the Constitution barring states from impairing the obligations of contracts is applicable not just to past contracts, but also to future contracts. Ogden's attorneys included Henry Clay. The case was initially argued in 1824, and then again in 1827.

== Ruling ==
The main issue of the case was whether or not the New York law violated the Obligation of Contracts Clause of the Constitution. It hinged on whether Congress had exclusive power to pass bankruptcy laws, which itself depended on what was meant by the clause prohibiting states from passing laws impairing the "obligations of contracts". The court's decision found that the clause prevented states from passing only laws affecting contracts already signed; laws that affected future contracts were construed to become part of the contracts themselves. Since the statute was part of the conditions of any prospective contract, the parties to the contract were presumed to have considered the law in signing the contract; the obligation, then, incorporated the possibility of bankruptcy rather than being impaired by it.

== John Marshall ==
Chief Justice John Marshall authored a separate opinion "assenting" to the judgment in part, and dissenting in part. He maintained that the Contract Clause gave the federal legislature the exclusive power over bankruptcy laws, rejecting the argument that state laws became part of contracts signed within the state thereafter. Marshall was joined in his dissent by Associate Justices Gabriel Duvall and Joseph Story. Near the end of his opinion the Chief Justice recapitulates what is perhaps the central contention of his opinion: "contracts derive their obligation from the act of the parties, not from the grant of government". The Chief Justice in the course of his opinion uses the "will theory of contract". The fact that the state may define how contracts can be formed, how defaults can be remedied, and even exclude from the outset certain types of contract, usurious ones for example, does not make contract a creature of the state. The obligation of any particular contract is what the parties determine it to be. Thus, if Ogden owes Saunders a certain amount in legal tender coin, it is not within the authority of the state, under the US Constitution, to alter that obligation so that, for example, Ogden may simply hand over his property to Saunders in settlement of the debt.

Marshall took this opportunity to set forth his general principles of constitutional interpretation:

To say that the intention of the instrument must prevail; that this intention must be collected from its words; that its words are to be understood in that sense in which they are generally used by those for whom the instrument was intended; that its provisions are neither to be restricted into insignificance, nor extended to objects not comprehended in them, nor contemplated by its framers; — is to repeat what has been already said more at large, and is all that can be necessary.

In his Ogden dissent, Marshall also adopted a definition of the word "law" that would later be denounced by the individualist anarchist Lysander Spooner.

== See also ==
- List of United States Supreme Court cases, volume 25
- Cessio bonorum
