= First inauguration of James Monroe =

8th United States presidential inauguration

First presidential inauguration of James Monroe
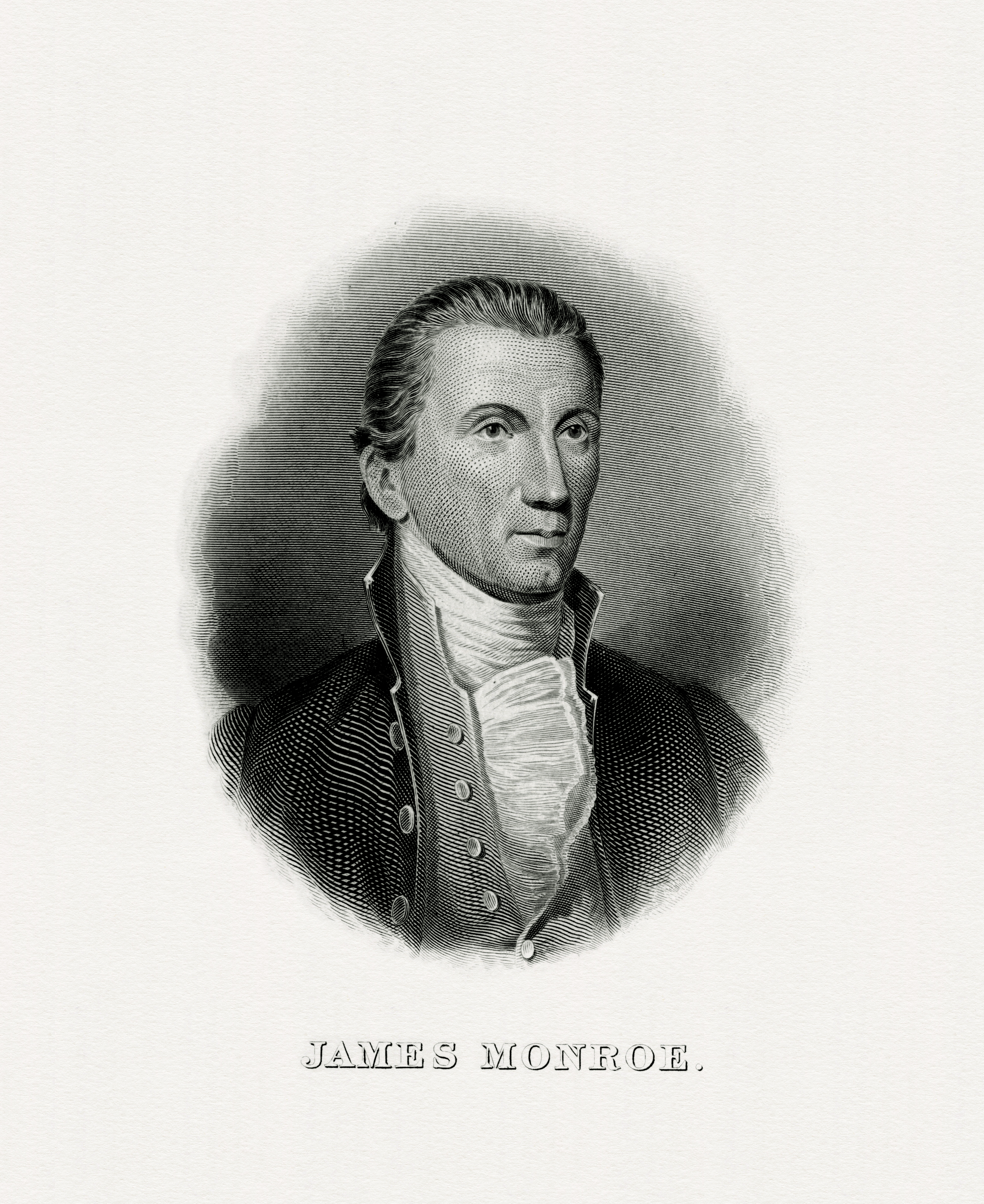
- BEP engraved portrait of Monroe as president.
- Date: March 4, 1817; 209 years ago
- Location: Washington, D.C. Old Brick Capitol
- Participants: James Monroe; 5th president of the United States — Assuming office John Marshall; Chief Justice of the United States — Administering oath Daniel D. Tompkins; 6th vice president of the United States — Assuming office John Gaillard; President pro tempore of the United States Senate — Administering oath

The first inauguration of James Monroe as president of the United States was held on Tuesday, March 4, 1817, in front of the Old Brick Capitol, where the Supreme Court building now stands. The inauguration marked the commencement of the first four-year term of James Monroe as president and Daniel D. Tompkins as vice president. The Chief Justice, John Marshall administered the oath of office.

== Ceremony ==
On March 4, 1817, Monroe arrived at the Capitol at noon in front of a large crowd of around 8000 people, the largest crowd to gather in the city to that point. The ceremony, unlike previous inaugurations, took place outside on a platform because Congress could not agree on protocols for an indoor occasion. Henry Clay, unhappy that Monroe did not appoint him Secretary of State, had opposed an event in the House chamber and did not attend the inauguration. The weather was mild and sunny. The Marine Corps and some militia regiments were the first to greet Monroe on his arrival.

After vice president Tompkins spoke briefly, Monroe, never a good public speaker, gave his inaugural address but was difficult for the audience to hear. He called for increased military buildup after the recent War of 1812 as well as unity between Republicans and Federalists to bring an end to factionalism.

== See also ==
- Presidency of James Monroe
- Second inauguration of James Monroe
- 1816 United States presidential election
