= Second inauguration of James Monroe =

9th United States presidential inauguration

Second presidential inauguration of James Monroe
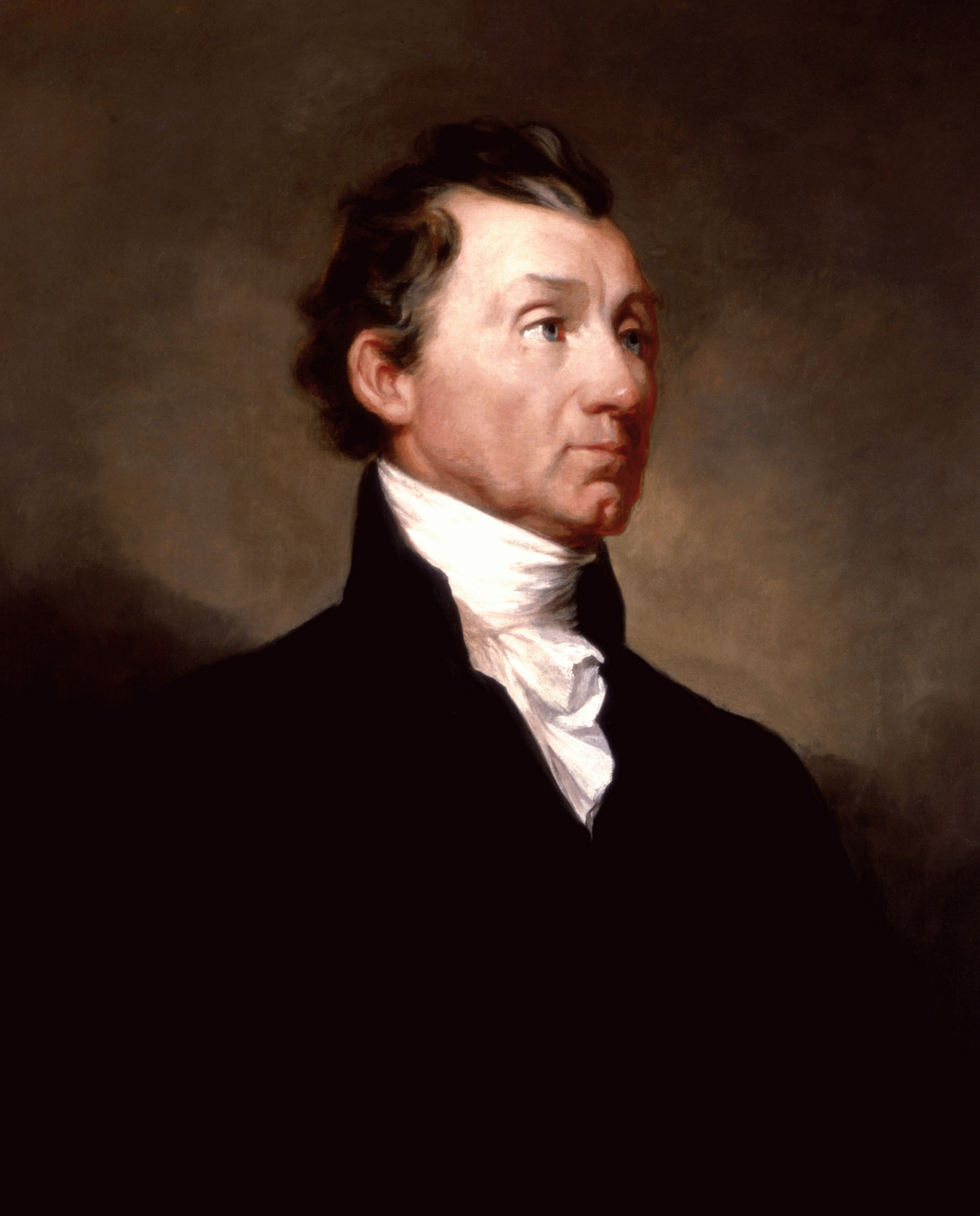
- James Monroe
- Date: March 5, 1821; 205 years ago
- Location: Washington, D.C. United States Capitol
- Participants: James Monroe; 5th president of the United States — Assuming office John Marshall; Chief Justice of the United States — Administering oath Daniel D. Tompkins; 6th vice president of the United States — Assuming office William P. Van Ness; United States District Judge — Administering oath

The second inauguration of James Monroe as president of the United States was held on Monday, March 5, 1821, in the House chamber of the U.S. Capitol. The inauguration marked the commencement of the second four-year term of James Monroe as president and Daniel D. Tompkins as vice president. Monroe had almost unanimously won the election of 1820 for a second term. He was sworn in by John Marshall, the Chief Justice of the United States.

Because of a snowstorm, the inauguration was held indoors; also, because March 4, 1821, was a Sunday, Monroe moved the inauguration to the following day after talking with justices of the Supreme Court.

== Ceremony ==
The inauguration took place indoors in the newly refurbished House chamber, unlike Monroe's first inauguration which happened in front of the Capitol. Around 3000 people crammed into the chamber for the occasion. Monroe arrived at noon in a plain carriage with his cabinet members behind him. Vice President Tompkins did not attend the occasion and instead took the oath of office in New York.

In his inaugural address, Monroe addressed recent achievements in negotiating the acquisition of Florida from Spain, loosely endorsed a higher tariff, and called for efforts to civilize Native Americans after recent attacks. He generally avoided discussing the ongoing Panic of 1819 and the Missouri Compromise situation.

After the speech, Monroe hosted an inaugural ball at Brown's Hotel.

== See also ==
- Presidency of James Monroe
- First inauguration of James Monroe
- 1820 United States presidential election
