= Timeline of the James Madison presidency =

The presidency of James Madison began on March 4, 1809, when James Madison was inaugurated as the fourth president of the United States, and ended on March 4, 1817, after two terms.

== 1809 ==
=== March 1809 ===
- March 4
  - James Madison is inaugurated as the fourth president of the United States. George Clinton becomes vice president.
  - Madison retains Albert Gallatin as secretary of the treasury, Caesar Rodney as attorney general, Gideon Granger as postmaster general, and Robert Smith as secretary of the navy.
- March 6 – Robert Smith becomes secretary of state.
- March 7 – William Eustis becomes secretary of war. Paul Hamilton succeeds Robert Smith as secretary of the navy.
- March 15 – The Supreme Court issues its decision in Bank of the United States v. Deveaux. It rules that corporations can file or receive lawsuits in federal court in cases of diversity jurisdiction.
- March 25 – The American delegation to the United Kingdom learns that, despite the Erskine Agreement, the UK has decided not to revoke the 1807 Orders in Council. This news will not reach the United States for another six weeks.

=== April 1809 ===
- April 19 – Madison proclaims the Erskine Agreement that will end the American embargo on the United Kingdom.

=== May 1809 ===
- May 22 – The 11th United States Congress opens its first session.
- May 23 – Madison informs Congress that following the Erskine Agreement, trade with the United Kingdom can resume on June 10.

=== June 1809 ===
- The 11th United States Congress adjourns its first session.

=== July 1809 ===
- July 31 – The 1801 friendship and commerce treaty between France and the United States expires.

=== August 1809 ===
- August 1 – Albert Gallatin considers resigning as secretary of the treasury amid his unpopularity among Congress and the cabinet, but Madison persuades him not to.
- August 9 – Madison restores the embargo on the United Kingdom.

=== September 1809 ===
- September 30 – The United Signs the Treaty of Fort Wayne with the Delaware, Eel River, Miami, and Potawatomi peoples.

=== October 1809 ===
- October 26 – The United States signs a treaty with the Wea.

=== November 1809 ===
- November 5 – John Quincy Adams becomes the first United States minister plenipotentiary to Russia.
- The 11th United States Congress opens its second session.
- November 29 – Madison delivers the 1809 State of the Union Address.

=== December 1809 ===
- December 9 – The United States signs a treaty with the Kickapoo.
- December 12 – Madison nominates Buckner Thruston to the Circuit Court of the District of Columbia.

== 1810 ==
=== January 1810 ===
- January 3 – In response to disagreements with Spain over West Florida, Madison requests from Congress the power to raise 100,000 militiamen.

=== March 1810 ===
- March 16 – The Supreme Court issues its decision in Fletcher v. Peck. It rules that the state government of Georgia could not revoke the deeds sold to speculators during the Yazoo land scandal despite the seller acquiring them illegally.

=== April 1810 ===
- April 16 – The Supreme Court rules in Fletcher v. Peck that Georgia's resolutions to the Yazoo land scandal violated contract rights. This is the first time that the Supreme Court has struck down a state law as unconstitutional. Madison responds by stating his intent to appoint members of his own party to the court.

=== May 1810 ===
- May 1
  - Macon's Bill Number 2 replaces the Non-Intercourse Act, restoring American trade with France and the United Kingdom. It provides for the ability to restore either embargo depending on the countries' responses.
  - The 11th United States Congress adjourns its second session.

=== June 1810 ===
- June 7 – Thomas Sumter Jr. becomes minister plenipotentiary to Portugal, filling the vacancy left by William Loughton Smith in 1801.
- June 22 – The 1800 treaty of amity and commerce between Prussia and the United States expires. Portions will be revived in 1828.

=== August 1810 ===
- August 5 – The Cadore Letter is delivered to the American minister in France. It says France will end the trade restrictions imposed by the Berlin Decree and the Milan Decree if the United Kingdom ends its restrictions, or if the United States restores its restrictions against the United Kingdom.
- August 6 – The 1810 United States census begins.

=== September 1810 ===
- September 14 – John Armstrong Jr. ends his tenure as minister plenipotentiary to France.

=== October 1810 ===
- October 27 – Madison authorizes the occupation and annexation of Spanish West Florida after Americans seize land and establish the Republic of West Florida. He declares it to be part of the land sold to the United States during the Louisiana Purchase.

=== November 1810 ===
- November 2 – France and the United States agree to normalize trade under the terms of Macon's Bill Number 2.
- November 5 – Jonathan Russell becomes chargé d'Affaires to France while the position of minister plenipotentiary is vacant.

=== December 1810 ===
- December 3 – The 11th United States Congress opens its third session.
- December 5 – Madison delivers the 1810 State of the Union Address.

== 1811 ==
=== January 1811 ===
- January 2 – Madison nominates Levi Lincoln Sr. to the Supreme Court, but he declines. He nominates John Tyler Sr. to the District Court for the District of Virginia.
- January 11 – The No-Transfer Resolution of 1811 decrees that the United States will oppose the acquisition of Florida (then part of the Spanish Empire) by other countries.
- January 15 – The president is authorized to occupy West Florida.

=== February 1811 ===
- February 2 – Madison restores the American embargo on the United Kingdom. France had agreed to normalize trade with the United States, but it continues seizing American ships.
- February 4 – Madison nominates Alexander Wolcott to the Supreme Court.
- February 13 – The Senate rejects Wolcott's Supreme Court nomination.
- February 20 – The Territory of Orleans is authorized to form a state government.
- February 21
  - Madison nominates John Quincy Adams to the Supreme Court, but he declines.
  - Madison vetoes the incorporation of an Episcopal church in Washington, D.C., arguing that it would violate the Establishment Clause.
- February 28 – Madison vetoes an offer of land in the Mississippi Territory to a Baptist congregation, arguing that it would violate the Establishment Clause.

=== March 1811 ===
- March 2
  - The Non-Importation Act of 1811 restores a ban on British good or ships in American ports.
  - The Indian Trading House Act of 1811 reauthorizes the president to appoint a superintendent of Indian trade to oversee trade with Native American tribes.
- March 3
  - The First Bank of the United States closes after Congress declines to extend its charter, fearing potential British influence.
  - The 11th United States Congress adjourns its third session.

=== April 1811 ===
- April 2 – James Monroe succeeds Robert Smith as secretary of state.

=== May 1811 ===
- May 7 – William Pinkney's tenure as minister plenipotentiary to the United Kingdom ends.
- May 16 – A battle takes place between the American frigate USS President and the British frigate HMS Little Belt.

=== July 1811 ===
- July 2 – Robert Smith, Madison's former secretary of state, publishes Address to the People of the United States, in which he criticizes Madison's cabinet.
- July 6 – British minister to the United States Augustus Foster arrives in Washington, D.C. and threatens action against American commerce if Madison maintains an embargo against the United Kingdom.
- July 24 – Madison schedules a special session of Congress for November 4 in regard to the conflict with the United Kingdom.

=== November 1811 ===
- November 4 – The 12th United States Congress opens its first session.
- November 5 – Madison delivers the 1811 State of the Union Address. He uses it to prepare for war with the United Kingdom.
- November 7 – The Battle of Tippecanoe takes place. A militia led by William Henry Harrison, an army general and the incumbent governor of Indiana Territory, defeats Tecumseh and the Shawnee. The battle was a preemptive strike in response to Tecumseh's efforts to confederate the Native American tribes.
- November 15
  - Madison nominates Gabriel Duvall and Joseph Story to the Supreme Court to fill the vacancies left by Samuel Chase and William Cushing, respectively.
  - Jonathan Russell becomes chargé d'Affaires to the United Kingdom while the position of minister plenipotentiary is vacant.
- November 18 – Joel Barlow becomes minister plenipotentiary to France, filling the vacancy left by John Armstrong in 1810.
- November 25 – James Monroe becomes secretary of state.

=== December 1811 ===
- December 5 – Caesar Rodney resigns as attorney general.
- December 11 – William Pinkney succeeds Caesar Rodney as attorney general.
- December 18 – Madison briefs Congress on the Battle of Tippecanoe.

== 1812 ==
=== January 1812 ===
- January 11 – The cap on enlistment for the United States Army is increased by 25,000 men.
- January 14 – Funding of $1.5 million is authorized for army equipment and $400,000 for naval equipment.
- January 27 – Congress considers a law expanding the navy, but it fails in the House of Representatives.

=== February 1812 ===
- February 7 – Madison issues pardons to military deserters who return to duty.

=== March 1812 ===
- March 3 – The Supreme Court delivers its decision in New Jersey v. Wilson that Indian territory retains any rights granted to it when sold to non-Indians.
- March 9 – Madison reports on the Henry letters of the spy John Henry, which implicate James Henry Craig, the governor general of Canada, of subversive activity in New England.
- March 13 – Madison nominates Thomas Parker to the District Court for the District of South Carolina, but he declines.
- March 14 – The president is authorized to borrow up to $11 million for military funding.
- March 21 – Augustus Foster informs the United States that the United Kingdom will not end its hostile action against American ships.
- March 23 – News reaches the United States that France has sunk American ships that had been delivering flour to the British army. Support for war against France grows in Congress.
- March 29 – The first White House wedding occurs when Thomas Todd, a justice of the Supreme Court, marries Lucy Washington, the sister of first lady Dolley Madison, at the White House.

=== April 1812 ===
- April 1 – Madison asks Congress to impose an embargo on all vessels in port. This is a response to the French sinking of American ships.
- April 3 – Madison vetoes a bill that would allow Supreme Court justices to fill vacancies in other judicial positions, determining that it is a violation of the separation of powers.
- April 4 – An embargo on all American ships in port is enacted.
- April 8 – A bill is passed allowing the Orleans Territory to be admitted as a U.S. state named Louisiana.
- April 10 – The president is authorized to raise up to 100,000 militiamen.
- April 14 – The planned borders of Louisiana are expanded to include the Florida Parishes of West Florida.
- April 20 – Vice President George Clinton dies, leaving the office of vice president vacant.
- April 22 – Madison nominates John Fisher to the District Court for the District of Delaware.
- April 25 – Louisiana is admitted as the eighteenth state of the United States.

=== May 1812 ===
- May 4 – Madison nominates John Drayton to the District Court for the District of South Carolina.
- May 6 – Surveys are authorized for six million acres of land to be divided and distributed to soldiers following the completion of their service.
- May 18 – The Democratic-Republican Party renominates Madison to be its candidate for the presidency.
- May 23 – Madison prepares to make a case for war after reading a letter from Lord Castlereigh to Augustus Foster confirming that the United Kingdom would continue its actions against shipping.
- May 25 – Madison nominates William P. Van Ness to the District Court for the District of New York.
- May 27 – Madison nominates Dominic Augustin Hall to the District Court for the District of Louisiana. He had been on the District Court for the District of Orleans until its abolition.

=== June 1812 ===
- June 1 – Madison requests that Congress declare war against the United Kingdom.
- June 4
  - The House of Representatives votes to declare war against the United Kingdom, with 79 in favor and 49 opposed.
  - The Missouri Territory is created from the land of the Louisiana Purchase that remained after Louisiana was admitted as a state.
- June 16 – To prevent war, the United Kingdom revokes the Orders in Council to end its naval action against American ships.
- June 17 – The Senate votes to declare war on the United Kingdom, with 19 in favor and 13 opposed.
- June 18
  - Madison declares war against the United Kingdom. This begins the War of 1812.
  - Jonathan Russell's tenure as chargé d'Affaires to the United Kingdom ends.
- June 22 – General Henry Dearborn asks the states of New England to cap the number of militiamen guarding their borders, but Connecticut, Massachusetts, and Rhode Island do not implement a cap.
- June 23 – The end of the Orders in Council is announced by Lord Castlereigh.
- June 30 – Treasury notes totaling $5 million are authorized to fund the war.

=== July 1812 ===
- July 1 – Duties on foreign goods are doubled.
- July 6
  - The United States bans trade with foreign enemies or transporting goods into enemy territories.
  - The 12th United States Congress adjourns its first session.
- July 9 – Madison proclaims a national day of prayer for the war.

=== August 1812 ===
- August 8 – General Dearborn negotiates an armistice with Lower Canada.
- August 11 – General William Hull, the governor of Michigan, ends the American attack on Fort Malden.
- August 16 – British soldiers capture Detroit when General Hull surrenders before combat begins.
- August 25 – General Dearborn ends the armistice with Lower Canada following Madison's opposition.

=== October 1812 ===
- October 8 – Madison issues pardons to military deserters who return to duty.
- October 25 – The HMS Macedonian is captured by the USS United States.

=== November 1812 ===
- November 1 – The 1812 presidential election takes place. Madison defeats DeWitt Clinton of the Federalist Party with 128 electoral votes against Clinton's 89.
- November 2 – The 12th United States Congress opens its second session.
- November 4 – Madison delivers the 1812 State of the Union Address.
- November 5 – Madison pocket vetoes a naturalization bill after warning that it could be abused.
- November 12 – Madison nominates David Howell to the District Court for the District of Rhode Island.

=== December 1812 ===
- December 26 – Joel Barlow's tenure as minister plenipotentiary to France ends.
- December 31 – William Eustis and Paul Hamilton end their tenures as secretary of war and secretary of the navy, respectively.

== 1813 ==
=== January 1813 ===
- January 2 – The Navy is authorized to construct four seventy-four gun ships and six forty-four gun first-class frigates.
- January 12 – William Jones succeeds Paul Hamilton as secretary of the navy.
- January 13 – John Armstrong Jr. succeeds William Eustis as secretary of war.
- January 18
  - The Battle of Frenchtown takes place. American General James Winchester surrenders, effectively ending the involvement of the northwestern states in the war.
  - Madison nominates St. George Tucker to the District Court for the District of Virginia.
- January 29 – The president is authorized to raise another twenty regiments for the army.

=== February 1813 ===
- February 10 – Congress counts the presidential electoral votes.

=== March 1813 ===
- March 3
  - The United States government authorizes anyone to destroy British ships and offers a bounty for each ship.
  - The president is empowered to carry out "full and ample retaliation" in response to any Native American tribe that attacks the United States on behalf of the United Kingdom.
  - The Department of War is expanded with the creation of three departments: the adjutant general, the inspector general, and the quartermaster general.
  - The 12th United States Congress adjourns its second session.
- March 4 – Madison is inaugurated for his second term as president. Elbridge Gerry becomes vice president.
- March 15 – The Supreme Court issues its decision in Fairfax's Devisee v. Hunter's Lessee. It rules that the state of Virginia was incorrect when it seized land owned by Loyalists.

=== April 1813 ===
- April 13 – Madison selects Theodore G. Hunt as a recess appointment to the District Court for the District of Louisiana, but Hunt declines.
- April 21 – James A. Bayard and Albert Gallatin depart from the United States to Saint Petersburg. They will form a delegation with John Quincy Adams to negotiate peace talks with the United Kingdom, hosted by Russia.

=== May 1813 ===
- May 24
  - The 13th United States Congress opens its first session.
  - The brig USS Lawrence is launched at Presque Isle, Pennsylvania.
- May 25 – Madison reports to Congress on the delegation to negotiate peace with the United Kingdom.
- May 29 – Madison nominates Dominic Augustin Hall to the District Court for the District of Louisiana to restore him to the seat he had vacated in February.
- May 31 – Madison nominates Adams, Bayard, and Gallatin as peace negotiators.

=== June 1813 ===
- June 12 – The corvette USS General Pike is launched at Sackets Harbor, New York.

=== July 1813 ===
- July 19 – The Senate rejects Gallatin's nomination as a peace negotiator. The nomination is later approved on the condition that Gallatin is removed as Secretary of the Treasury.
- July 22 – The office of Commissioner of Revenue is created within the Department of the Treasury. Districts are established in each state for the collection of duties and direct taxes.
- July 24 – The Revenue Acts of 1813 impose taxes on refined sugar, carriages, liquor distilleries, and ship auctions.

=== August 1813 ===
- August 1 – The brig USS Niagara leaves Erie, having been launched earlier in the summer but held under blockade by the British.
- August 2
  - The president is authorized to borrow $7.5 million to fund the war.
  - Direct taxes totaling $3 million are imposed on states and counties.
  - Direct taxes are imposed on those selling liquor or imported goods.
  - Duties are imposed on banks and banknotes.
  - The 13th United States Congress adjourns its first session.
- August 6 – The sloop-of-war USS Preble is commissioned for the Navy following its purchase.

=== September 1813 ===
- September 10 – The Battle of Lake Erie takes place. American Captain Oliver Hazard Perry of the USS Lawrence takes control of Lake Erie after losing most of his sailors and rowing to another ship.
- September 11 – The sloop-of-war USS Frolic is launched at Charlestown, Boston, Massachusetts.
- September 19 – The sloop-of-war USS Peacock is launched at the New York Navy Yard.

=== October 1813 ===
- October 5 – The Battle of the Thames takes place. General William Henry Harrison expels British and Indian forces from the northwest and from Upper Canada. The Shawnee leader Tecumseh is killed and the pan–Indian alliances of the northwest collapse.

=== November 1813 ===
- November 3 – The sloop-of-war USS Erie is launched at Baltimore.

=== December 1813 ===
- December 6 – The 13th United States Congress opens its second session.
- December 7 – Madison delivers the 1813 State of the Union Address.
- December 9 – Madison requests a ban on trade with the United Kingdom or for any British-made goods. Congress approves the ban days later.
- December 14 – William H. Crawford becomes minister plenipotentiary to France, filling the vacancy left by Joel Barlow in 1812.
- December 17 – An embargo is imposed on all vessels docked in American ports and harbors.
- December 27 – Documents and records of Congress are made available to the national library, state governments, universities, and historical societies.

== 1814 ==
=== January 1814 ===
- January 3 – A British invitation to peace negotiations reaches the United States.
- January 6 – Madison reports to Congress on the British invitation to peace negotiations.
- January 27 – The payment for military service is increased.

=== February 1814 ===
- February 1 – Madison selects John Quincy Adams, James Bayard, Henry Clay, Albert Gallatin, and Jonathan Russell to participate in peace talks in Gothenburg, hosted by Sweden.
- February 8 – Albert Gallatin resigns as Secretary of the Treasury.
- February 9 – George W. Campbell succeeds Albert Gallatin as secretary of the treasury.
- February 10
  - Richard Rush succeeds William Pinkney as attorney general.
  - The first of four February bills to expand the military is signed.

=== March 1814 ===
- March 7 – The corvette USS Saratoga is launched.
- March 17 – Return J. Meigs Jr. succeeds Gideon Granger as postmaster general.
- March 24 – The president is authorized to borrow $25 million to fund the war.
- March 27 – The Battle of Horseshoe Bend takes place. General Andrew Jackson, the Cherokee people, and the Lower Creek people defeat the Upper Creek Red Sticks. The killing of the Red Sticks invites settlers to occupy the land.
- March 31 – Madison asks Congress to end the embargo on France following the collapse of the French Empire as led by Napoleon Bonaparte.

=== April 1814 ===
- April 7 – The brig USS Jefferson is launched at Sackets Harbor, New York.
- April 10 – The brig USS Jones is launched at Sackets Harbor, New York.
- April 11 – The corvette USS Saratoga is launched.
- April 14 – The United States ends its trade embargo following the change of leadership in France.
- April 18 – The 13th United States Congress adjourns its second session.
- April 28 – John Quincy Adams' tenure as minister plenipotentiary to Russia ends.

=== May 1814 ===
- May 2 – The frigate USS Superior is launched at Sackets Harbor, New York.
- May 11 – General William Henry Harrison resigns. Despite Madison's objection, Andrew Jackson succeeds Harrison as major general.

=== June 1814 ===
- June 11 – The frigate USS Mohawk is launched at Sackets Harbor, New York.
- June 20 – The frigate USS Guerriere is launched at the Philadelphia Naval Shipyard.
- June 22 – The ship-of-the-line USS Independence is launched at the Boston Navy Yard.

=== July 1814 ===
- July 1 – Madison orders a military district to be created around Baltimore and Washington, D.C. Brigadier General William H. Winder is given command.
- July 22 – The United States signs the Treaty of Greenville with the Delaware, Miami, Seneca, Shawnee, and Wyandot peoples.
- July 27 – The Battle of Burnt Corn takes place in the Mississippi Territory. This prompts the Creek to join the war against the United States.

=== August 1814 ===
- August 9 – The United States signs the Treaty of Fort Jackson with the Creek people. The treaty is the result of the Battle of Horseshoe Bend, and it cedes two thirds of the Creeks' territory to the United States.
- August 11 – The USS Surprise, later renamed the USS Eagle, is launched at Vergennes, Vermont.
- August 24 – The British launch an attack on Washington, D.C., commencing the Burning of Washington in retaliation for American burning of Canadian government buildings. The government retreats from the city. First lady Dolley Madison oversees the safe removal of the Lansdowne Portrait of George Washington and various government documents. The White House will finish reconstruction in 1817.
- August 25 – The ship-of-the-line USS Franklin is launched at the Philadelphia Naval Shipyard.

=== September 1814 ===
- September 1
  - Madison issues a proclamation asking American citizens to protect Washington D.C.
  - The Battle of Plattsburgh ends with an American victory against the British.
- September 14 – The Battle of Baltimore takes place. General Samuel Smith repels a British invasion. Francis Scott Key writes "The Star-Spangled Banner" following the American victory.
- September 19 – The 13th United States Congress opens its third session.
- September 20 – Madison delivers the 1814 State of the Union Address.
- September 27 – Secretary of State James Monroe succeeds John Armstrong as secretary of war.

=== October 1814 ===
- October 1 – The ship-of-the-line USS Washington is launched at the Portsmouth Naval Shipyard.
- October 4 – George W. Campbell resigns as secretary of the treasury.
- October 5 – Madison appoints Alexander J. Dallas as secretary of the treasury to fill the vacancy left by George W. Campbell.
- October 6 – Alexander J. Dallas succeeds Albert Gallatin as secretary of the treasury.
- October 17 – Secretary of the Treasury Alexander J. Dallas requests that Congress authorize a national bank.
- October 18 – The Massachusetts General Court calls for the states of New England to hold a convention in opposition to the federal government's military and trade policies.
- October 21 – The federal government purchases the personal library of Thomas Jefferson.

=== November 1814 ===
- November 7 – Following his campaign against the Creek, Jackson captures British-occupied territory of Spain in Pensacola, Florida, while pursuing Creek forces. He does this without authorization.
- November 15 – The president is authorized to borrow $3 million to fund the war.
- November 23 – Vice President Elbridge Gerry dies, leaving the office of vice president vacant.
- November 29 – A special House committee on the Burning of Washington delivers its report.

=== December 1814 ===
- December 1 – William Jones resigns as secretary of the navy.
- December 9 – The Senate votes to authorize a national bank.
- December 15 – The Hartford Convention begins meeting in Hartford, Connecticut, to express the interests of the states of New England.
- December 19 – Benjamin W. Crowninshield succeeds William Jones as secretary of the navy.
- December 24 – The United Kingdom and the United States finish peace talks and sign the Treaty of Ghent. It returns all seized territory besides West Florida and decrees that all prisoners of war are to be released.

== 1815 ==
=== January 1815 ===
- January 5 – The Hartford Convention ends. It releases a report criticizing the federal government's ability to defend New England and recommends negotiation to ensure protection. It also proposes constitutional amendments to protect New England interests as its population represents a shrinking proportion of the United States.
- January 7
  - The House passes a revised banking bill.
  - Madison nominates James Sewall Morsell to the Circuit Court of the District of Columbia.
- January 8 – The Battle of New Orleans takes place. The American forces are led by General Andrew Jackson and defeat the British forces. The victory makes Jackson a national hero and causes the public to reject the Hartford Convention and the Federalist Party.
- January 9 – Direct taxes totaling $6 million are imposed on houses, lands, and slaves.
- January 18 – A sales tax is imposed on numerous common goods.
- January 27 – The president is authorized to raise up to 40,000 state troops to serve within their home states.
- January 30
  - Madison is unwilling to accept the compromises in the revised banking bill and issues a veto.
  - Funding of $23,950 is authorized for the purchase of Thomas Jefferson's private library.

=== February 1815 ===
- February 4 – The Enemy Trade Act of 1815 authorizes military force to enforce embargoes and allows any federal officer sued in a state court to remove the case to a federal court.
- February 13 – News reaches the United States that the Treaty of Ghent has been signed.
- February 15 – Congress authorizes $500,000 to repair the capital.
- February 16 – The Senate ratifies the Treaty of Ghent.
- February 17 – The Treaty of Ghent comes into force.
- February 18 – Madison proclaims the signing of the Treaty of Ghent. The War of 1812 ends.
- February 20 – The USS Constitution captures the HMS Cyane.
- February 23 – Madison asks Congress for a declaration of war against Algiers.
- February 27 – The president is authorized to sell or lay up any naval flotilla gunboats.

=== March 1815 ===
- March 3
  - The United States declares war on Algiers for its actions against American ships and its demands of tribute. This begins the Second Barbary War.
  - The army is reduced to 10,000 men.
  - Tax collectors are given expanded authority to sue and prosecute for the collection of taxes.
  - The 13th United States Congress adjourns its third session.

=== April 1815 ===
- April 30 – William H. Crawford's tenure as minister plenipotentiary to France ends.

=== May 1815 ===
- May 10 – Ships led by Captain Stephen Decatur depart from New York to fight pirates in the Mediterranean Sea.

=== June 1815 ===
- June 1 – Albert Gallatin negotiates trade with the United Kingdom.
- June 8 – John Adams becomes envoy extraordinary and minister plenipotentiary to the United Kingdom, filling the vacancy left by William Pinkney in 1811.
- June 19 – Madison selects William Sanford Pennington as a recess appointment to the District Court for the District of New Jersey.
- June 30 – Algiers surrenders, ending the Second Barbary War. A peace treaty is signed.

=== July 1815 ===
- July 3 – The treaty of commerce and navigation with the United Kingdom is signed.
- July 6 – A peace treaty between Algiers and the United States is signed.
- July 18 – The United States signs the first Treaty of Portage des Sioux with the Potawatomi.
- July 19 – The United States signs Treaties of Portage des Sioux with multiple Sioux tribes..
- July 20
  - William Eustis becomes envoy extraordinary and minister plenipotentiary to the Netherlands, filling the vacancy left by William Vans Murray in 1801.
- The United States signs a Treaty of Portage des Sioux with the Makah.

=== August 1815 ===
- August 1 – William H. Crawford succeeds James Monroe as secretary of war.
- August 5 – The frigate USS Java is launched at Baltimore. It had been built for the War of 1812, but construction did not finish until after the war ended.
- August 25 – The ship-of-the-line USS Franklin is launched at the Philadelphia Navy Yard.

=== September 1815 ===
- September 2 – The United States signs a Treaty of Portage des Sioux with the Kickapoo.
- September 8 – The United States signs the Treaty of Spring Wells with the Chippewa, Delaware, Miami, Ottawa, Potawatomi, Seneca, Shawnee, and Wyandot peoples.
- September 12 – The United States signs a Treaty of Portage des Sioux with the Osage people.
- September 13 – The United States signs a Treaty of Portage des Sioux with the Sauk people.
- September 14 – The United States signs a Treaty of Portage des Sioux with the Fox people.
- September 16 – The United States signs a Treaty of Portage des Sioux with the Iowa people.

=== October 1815 ===
- October 22 – William H. Crawford succeeds Alexander J. Dallas as secretary of the treasury.
- October 28 – The United States signs a treaty with the Kansa people.

=== December 1815 ===
- December 4 – The 14th United States Congress opens its first session.
- December 5 – Madison delivers the 1815 State of the Union Address.
- December 6 – Madison submits the peace treaty with Algiers to the Senate.
- December 19 – The Senate ratifies the treaty of commerce and navigation with the United Kingdom.
- December 21 – The Senate ratifies the peace treaty with Algiers.
- December 26 – Madison proclaims the peace treaty with Algiers.

== 1816 ==
=== January 1816 ===
- January 8 – Madison nominates his recess appointment William Sanford Pennington to the District Court for the District of New Jersey.

=== March 1816 ===
- March 5 – The annual direct tax on states is reduced to $3 million.
- March 19 – Congressmen's are switched from daily compensation to an annual salary.
- March 20 – The Supreme Court issues its decision in Martin v. Hunter's Lessee. It rules that the Supreme Court can review the decisions of state courts if they pertain to federal law.
- March 22 – The United States signs a treaty with the Cherokee.

=== April 1816 ===
- April 10 – The Second Bank of the United States is authorized with a 20-year charter and $35 million in capital.
- April 19 – Indiana is authorized to enact a constitution and organize a state government.
- April 27 – The Tariff of 1816 imposes duties on imported goods.
- April 29
  - The Indian Trading License Law of 1816 bans non-citizens from trading with Native Americans in the United States.
  - The navy is authorized to construct nine seventy-four gun ships, twelve forty-four gun frigates, and three steam batteries.
- April 30 – The 14th United States Congress adjourns its first session.

=== May 1816 ===
- May 13 – The United States signs a treaty with the Sauk people.

=== June 1816 ===
- June 1 – The United States signs a treaty with three Sioux groups.
- June 3 – The United States signs a treaty with the Winnebago people.
- June 4 – The United States signs a treaty with the Kickapoo and Wea peoples.
- June 29 – Indiana adopts its constitution and forms a state government.

=== July 1816 ===
- July 16 – Albert Gallatin becomes envoy extraordinary and minister plenipotentiary to France, filling the vacancy left by William H. Crawford in 1815.

=== August 1816 ===
- August 24
  - George W. Erving becomes minister plenipotentiary to Spain, filling the vacancy left by Charles Pinckney in 1804.
  - The United States signs a treaty with the Chippewa, Ottawa, and Potawatomi peoples.

=== September 1816 ===
- September 4 – The United States signs a treaty of friendship and commerce with Sweden and Norway.
- September 14 – The United States signs the Treaty of Turkeytown with the Cherokee.
- September 20 – The United States signs the Treaty of the Chickasaw Council House with the Chickasaw.

=== October 1816 ===
- October 24 – The United States signs the Treaty of Fort St. Stephens with the Choctaw.

=== November 1816 ===
- November 1 – The 1816 presidential election takes places. Democratic–Republican candidate James Monroe defeats the Federalist candidate Rufus King with 183 electoral votes against King's 34.

=== December 1816 ===
- December 2 – The 14th United States Congress opens its second session.
- December 3 – Madison delivers the 1816 State of the Union Address.
- December 11 – Indiana is admitted as the nineteenth U.S. state.
- December 22 – A new peace and amity treaty is signed with Algiers. It will not be ratified until 1822.

== 1817 ==
=== January 1817 ===
- January 13 – William Pinkney becomes envoy extraordinary and minister plenipotentiary to Russia, filling the vacancy left by John Quincy Adams in 1814.
- January 28 – Madison nominates Robert Trimble to the District Court for the District of Kentucky. He nominates Benjamin Parke to the District Court for the District of Indiana, but no vote takes place.

=== February 1817 ===
- February 6
  - John Trumbull is authorized to create four paintings of the American Revolution to reside in the United States Capitol.
  - The March 1816 reform of Congressional salaries is repealed.
- February 19 – The Senate partially ratifies the treaty of Sweden and Norway.

=== March 1817 ===
- March 1
  - The western area of the Mississippi Territory is authorized to form a constitution and a state government.
  - The Navigation Act of 1817 bans non-American ships from carrying cargo from one American port to another, and from importing goods from other nations.
- March 3
  - Madison vetoes the Bonus Bill of 1817 that would have funded internal improvements.
  - The Alabama Territory is formed from lands in the Mississippi Territory.
  - The 14th United States Congress adjourns its second session.

== Works cited ==
- Bevans, Charles I. (1968). Treaties and Other International Agreements of the United States of America, 1776-1949. United States Department of State.
- Hall, Kermit L.; Ely, James W., eds. (2009). The Oxford Guide to United States Supreme Court Decisions (2nd ed.). Oxford University Press.
- Stathis, Stephen W. (2014). Landmark Legislation 1774–2012: Major U.S. Acts and Treaties (2nd ed.). CQ Press. ISBN 978-1-4522-9230-4.
