= Inauguration of James Madison =

Inauguration of James Madison may refer to:

- First inauguration of James Madison, 1809
- Second inauguration of James Madison, 1813

== See also ==
- The full text of James Madison's First Inaugural Address at Wikisource
- The full text of James Madison's Second Inaugural Address at Wikisource
