= Yazoo land scandal =

1790s real estate fraud

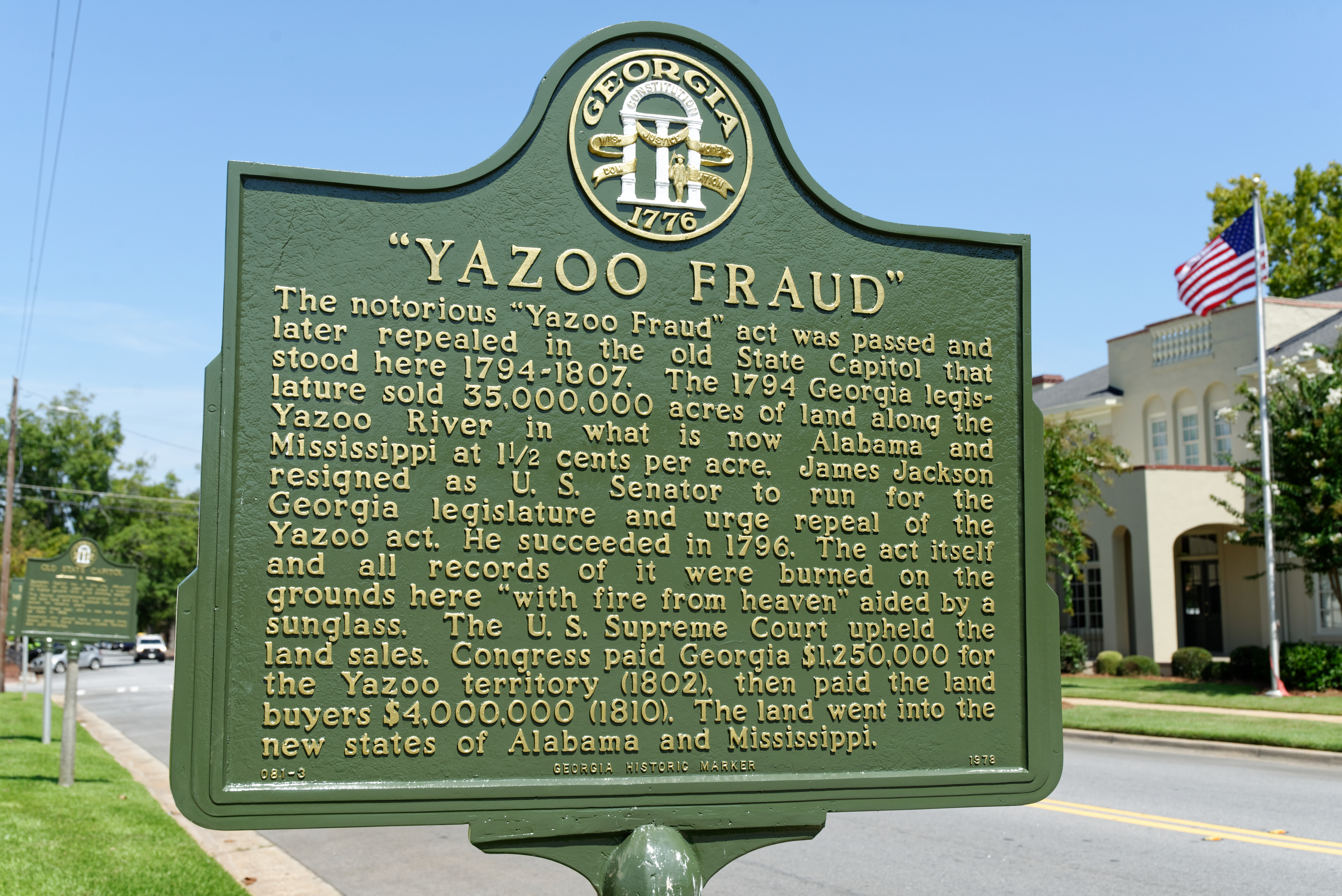
Historical marker at the site of the Georgia Capitol at the time

The Yazoo land scandal, Yazoo fraud, Yazoo land fraud, or Yazoo land controversy was a real-estate fraud perpetrated, in the mid-1790s, by Georgia governor George Mathews and the Georgia General Assembly. Georgia politicians sold large tracts of territory in the Yazoo lands, in what are now portions of the present-day states of Alabama and Mississippi, to political insiders at very low prices in 1794. Although the law enabling the sales was overturned by reformers the following year, its ability to do so was challenged in the courts, eventually reaching the US Supreme Court. In the landmark decision in Fletcher v. Peck (1810), the Court ruled that the contracts were binding and the state could not retroactively invalidate the earlier land sales. It was one of the first times the Supreme Court had overturned a state law, and it justified many claims for those lands. Some of the land sold by the state in 1794 had been shortly thereafter resold to innocent third parties, greatly complicating the litigation. In 1802, because of the ongoing controversy, Georgia ceded all of its claims to lands west of its modern border to the U.S. government. In exchange the government paid cash and assumed the legal liabilities. Claims involving the land purchases were not fully resolved until legislation was enacted in 1814 establishing a claims-resolution fund.

== Background ==
The origins of the Yazoo land scandal lay in the desire of the U.S. state of Georgia to firm up its territorial claims after the American Revolutionary War, and to satisfy a great demand for land to develop. The territory claimed by Georgia ran as far west as the Mississippi River, and included most of the present states of Alabama and Mississippi (from 31° N to 35° N, excepting only the coastal areas of those states). Some of this territory was claimed and occupied by Native Americans, and southern portions of the territory were also claimed by Spain as part of Spanish Florida. Lands along the Mississippi River near present-day Natchez, Mississippi had been settled during the British administration of West Florida, and had a strong Loyalist presence. Some Georgia authorities and speculators thought these developed lands could be seized.

=== Previous development attempts ===
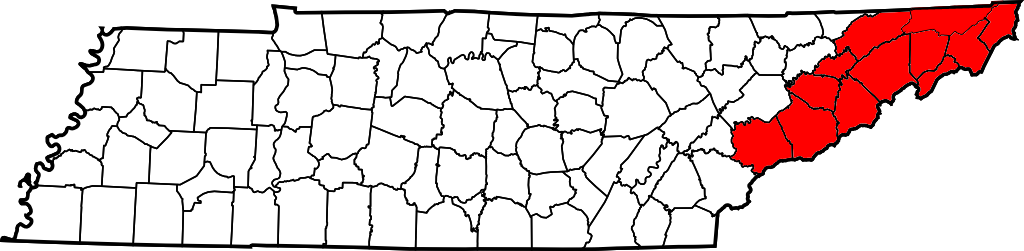
The State of Franklin (in red) superimposed on a map of modern Tennessee

The first attempt of Georgia to organize settlement in this area was a 1784 proposal to establish Houstoun County in the Muscle Shoals area. This attempt never got off the ground because its major proponents became involved instead in an effort to establish the State of Franklin in present-day eastern Tennessee.

In 1785 Governor George Mathews signed the Bourbon County Act, which organized Bourbon County, Georgia in the area east of the Mississippi and south of the Yazoo River. This area included the Natchez area and was in the area also claimed by Spain. The state appointed civil and judicial officers for the new county, but under pressure from the federal government, the Georgia General Assembly dissolved Bourbon County in 1788. The federal government opposed Bourbon County because of the unresolved Spanish claim, and because claims to the area by the Choctaw and Chickasaw Nations had not been extinguished.

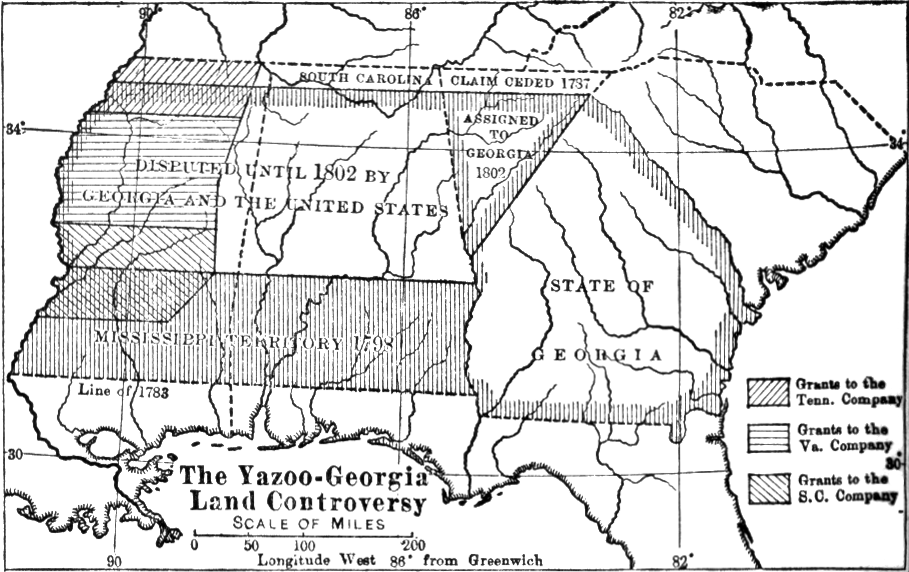
Map of the American Deep south, showing the three areas which constituted the 1789 Yazoo land scandal.

In about 1789, a secret society called the Combined Society was formed; the members' sole purpose was to make money by land speculation. This group secured influence in the Georgia legislature to further its aims. In 1789 three companies, The South Carolina Yazoo Company, The Virginia Yazoo Company (which was headed by Patrick Henry), and the Tennessee Company were formed by Combined Society interests to buy land from the Georgia legislature. Governor Edward Telfair signed a deal to sell 20,000,000 acres (81,000 km^{2}) of land to the Yazoo companies for $207,000, or about 1 cent per acre. These lands were located north of the mouth of the Yazoo River and extended eastward from the Mississippi. The deal collapsed in 1792 when the companies sought to pay with depreciated old currency, which the state refused to accept. The existence of the Combined Society was also exposed in 1792; some of its principals continued to be active in attempts to develop Georgia lands.

== Yazoo land sales ==
In 1794, four new companies were formed: the Georgia Company, the Georgia-Mississippi Company, the Upper Mississippi Company, and the new Tennessee Company. Their principals included individuals active in the 1789 purchases, as well as leading Georgia politicians such as James Gunn and United States Supreme Court Associate Justice James Wilson. These companies persuaded the Georgia General Assembly to sell more than 40,000,000 acres (160,000 km^{2}) of land for $500,000. Many Georgia officials and legislators were offered shares in these companies or bribes to secure their agreement to the sale. According to historian Thomas P. Abernathy, "several companies of speculators...had shamefully bribed all but two members of the legislature." On January 7, 1795, Governor Mathews signed into law a bill authorizing the sale of the 40,000,000 acres (160,000 km^{2}), known as the Yazoo Act.

The territory that was the subject of these purchases included most of the land that had been the subject of the 1789 purchase attempt, and a significant portion of it was resold to buyers in other parts of the country who were not aware of the shaky nature of the transactions.

== Repeal of sale ==
When the details of the sale were revealed, public outrage was widespread, and people protested to federal officials and Congressmen. Jared Irwin and U.S. Senator James Jackson led the reform efforts: Irwin was elected Governor of Georgia and, less than two months after taking office, signed a bill on February 13, 1796 passed by the General Assembly nullifying the Yazoo Act. The state burned all copies of the bill except for one that had been sent to President George Washington. Jackson resigned as Senator to run for office as next Governor of Georgia. He was elected and took office two years later.

But the matter was not over. The state refunded money to people who had purchased land, but some refused the money, preferring to keep the land. The state did not recognize their claims, and the matter was to wind through courts for the next decade. In 1802 the state ceded to the federal government all claim to lands west of its present border (which were organized into the Mississippi Territory), along with the ongoing legal disputes. Claims by third-party owners who had innocently purchased land from the original companies were not fully resolved until 1816. Spanish claims to the Georgia territory were resolved with the 1795 Treaty of San Lorenzo; Native American claims to the area were extinguished by a series of treaties ending in the 1820s.

Legal challenges to Georgia's attempt to repeal the sale reached the Supreme Court in 1810. The landmark Fletcher v. Peck decision marked one of the first times the Court overturned a state law, deciding that the land sales were binding contracts and could not be retroactively invalidated by the enactment of superseding legislation.

== See also ==
- List of federal political scandals in the United States
- Historical regions of the United States
