= 1813 State of the Union Address =

Speech by US President James Madison

- Date: December 7, 1813
- Venue: House Chamber, United States Capitol
- Location: Washington, D.C.; 38°53′23″N 77°00′32″W
- Type: State of the Union Address
- Participants: James Madison; Elbridge Gerry; Henry Clay
- Format: Written
- Previous: 1812 State of the Union Address
- Next: 1814 State of the Union Address

The 1813 State of the Union Address was delivered by the fourth president of the United States, James Madison, on December 7, 1813. Addressing the 13th United States Congress, Madison reflected on the ongoing War of 1812 and provided updates on both military and diplomatic efforts.

Madison expressed disappointment that British refusal to accept Russian mediation had stalled peace negotiations. Despite this setback, he highlighted several American victories, particularly in naval battles on the Great Lakes. Captain Oliver Hazard Perry’s victory on Lake Erie and General William Henry Harrison’s triumph at the Battle of the Thames were praised as key successes, helping secure the Northwest Territory from British and Native American threats.

Madison condemned Britain's continued use of Native American allies, accusing them of encouraging violence against American civilians. He also noted that Britain had escalated the conflict by threatening to execute American prisoners of war, forcing the U.S. to adopt retaliatory measures.

In the South, Madison reported on the successful suppression of the Creek War by forces led by General Andrew Jackson and General John Coffee, which weakened British influence over Native tribes in that region. He emphasized the need for continued military recruitment and called for a revision of the militia laws to ensure more efficient mobilization of troops.

Economically, Madison noted that while the war had strained resources, the American economy had adapted by increasing domestic manufacturing, reducing dependence on foreign imports. He encouraged Congress to support further development of the nation's industrial base.

Madison concluded by expressing confidence in the nation's ability to continue the war, defending American rights and sovereignty. He also praised the resilience of the American people and their commitment to the principles of liberty.

Preceded by 1812 State of the Union Address	State of the Union addresses 1813	Succeeded by 1814 State of the Union Address
