= 1815 State of the Union Address =

Speech by US President James Madison

- Date: December 5, 1815
- Venue: House Chamber, United States Capitol
- Location: Washington, D.C.; 38°53′23″N 77°00′32″W
- Type: State of the Union Address
- Participants: James Madison; John Gaillard; Henry Clay
- Format: Written
- Previous: 1814 State of the Union Address
- Next: 1816 State of the Union Address

The 1815 State of the Union Address was given by the fourth president of the United States, James Madison.

The State of the Union Address was given to the 14th United States Congress on Tuesday, December 5, 1815, but not verbally by the president. The War of 1812 was over, and he said, "It is another source of satisfaction that the treaty of peace with Great Britain has been succeeded by a convention on the subject of commerce concluded by the plenipotentiaries of the two countries. In this result a disposition is manifested on the part of that nation corresponding with the disposition of the United States, which it may be hoped will be improved into liberal arrangements on other subjects on which the parties have mutual interests, or which might endanger their future harmony." He concluded with, "As fruits of this experience and of the reputation acquired by the American arms on the land and on the water, the nation finds itself possessed of a growing respect abroad and of a just confidence in itself, which are among the best pledges for its peaceful career."

Notably the president's address also contains mention of the American victory in the Second Barbary War. Additionally, Madison recommended the expansion of the Military Academy. He also recommended a great national effort towards establishing roads and canals throughout the country.

Preceded by 1814 State of the Union Address	State of the Union addresses 1815	Succeeded by 1816 State of the Union Address
