= 1810 State of the Union Address =

Speech by US President James Madison

- Date: December 5, 1810
- Venue: House Chamber, United States Capitol
- Location: Washington, D.C.; 38°53′23″N 77°00′32″W
- Type: State of the Union Address
- Participants: James Madison; George Clinton; Joseph Bradley Varnum
- Format: Written
- Previous: 1809 State of the Union Address
- Next: 1811 State of the Union Address

The 1810 State of the Union Address was given during the first term of President James Madison, the fourth president of the United States. It was given on Wednesday, December 5, 1810 in Washington, D.C. It was "concerning the commercial intercourse between the United States and Great Britain and France and their dependencies having invited in a new form a termination of their edicts against our neutral commerce." It was given to the 11th United States Congress.

Notably, the President mentioned the overall relations with the Barbary States and Native Americans were improving. The address also contains mention of the state of affairs with Spanish Florida and the President noted that he was in contact with the Spanish Monarchy to discuss land boundaries.

Preceded by 1809 State of the Union Address	State of the Union addresses 1810	Succeeded by 1811 State of the Union Address
