= Yazoo lands =

Former territory of the U.S. state of Georgia; now part of Alabama and Mississippi

Coordinates: 32.9°N 88.3°W

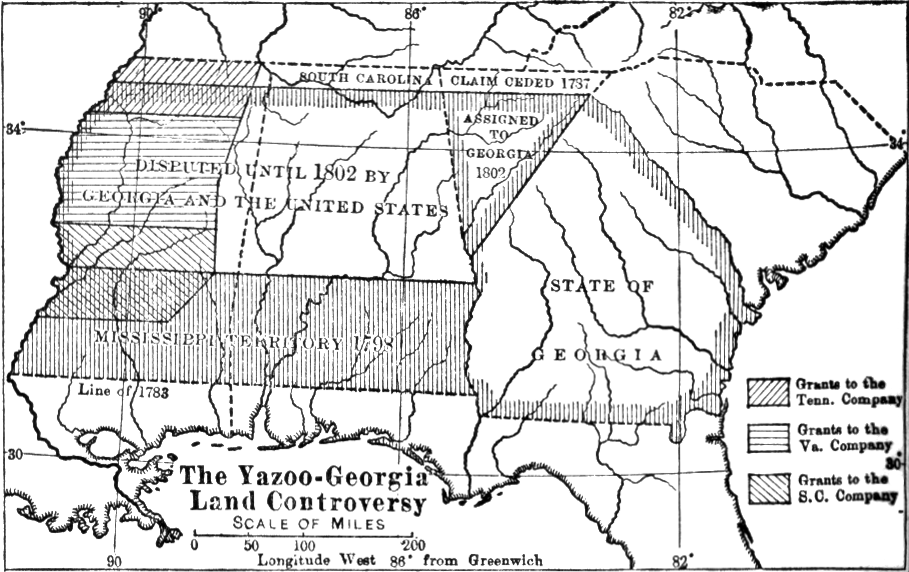
Map showing the Yazoo lands as "Disputed until 1802 by Georgia and the United States"

The Yazoo lands were the central and western regions of the U.S. state of Georgia, when its western border stretched back to the Mississippi. The Yazoo lands were named for the Yazoo nation, that lived on the lower course of the Yazoo, in what is now Mississippi.

The Yazoo lands would later become large portions of the present-day states of Alabama and Mississippi, along with portions of Spanish West Florida, which became the lower third of each state, and a narrow northern strip of land claimed by South Carolina in the Treaty of Beaufort that also stretched westward to the river, which became the two states' border counties with Tennessee.

In the 1790s, the Yazoo lands were the subject of a major political scandal in the state of Georgia, called the Yazoo land scandal. It led to Georgia's cession of the land to the U.S. government in the Compact of 1802.

== See also ==
- Historical regions of the United States
- Mississippi Territory
