= 1814 State of the Union Address =

Speech by US President James Madison

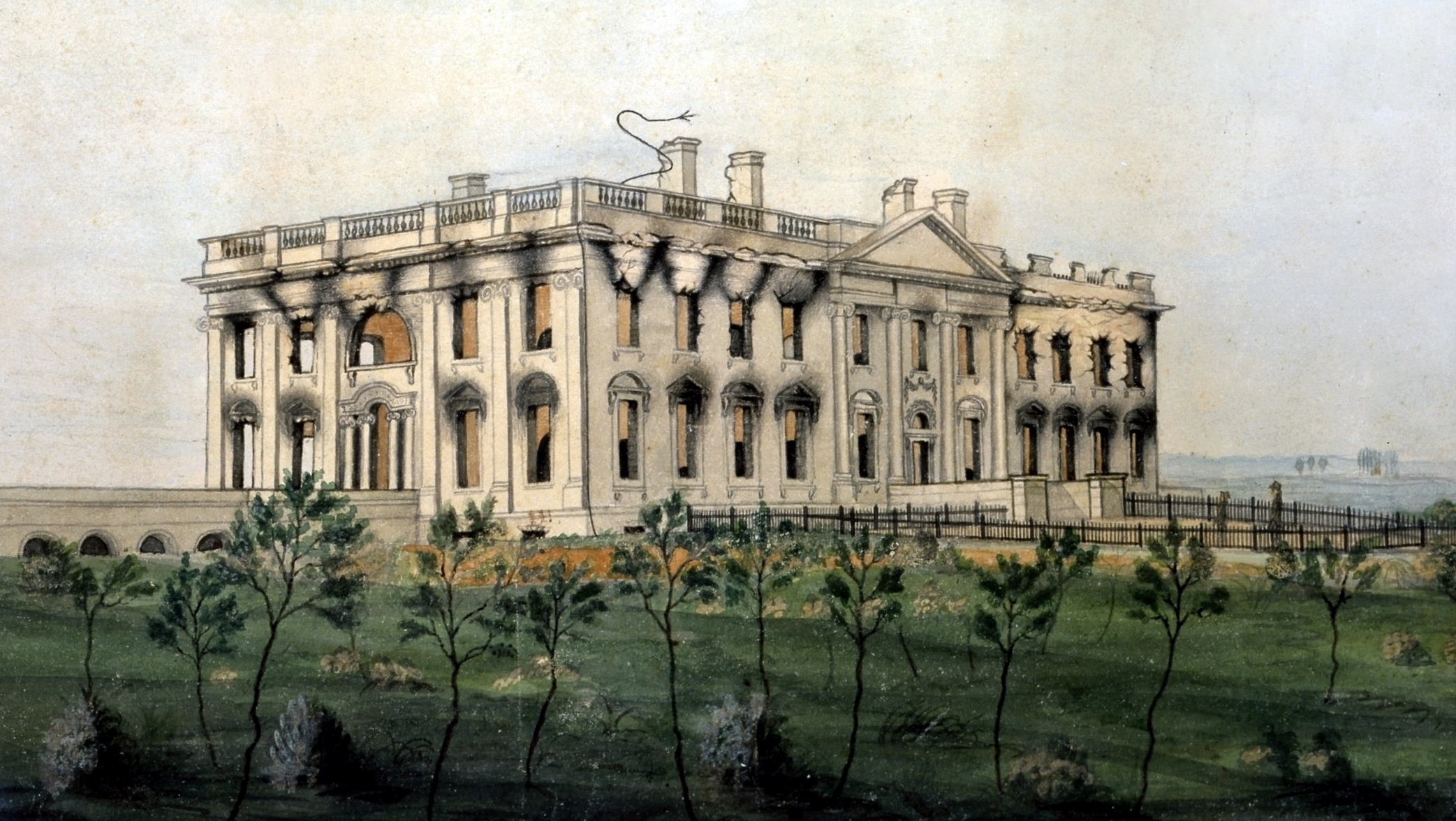
- The White House ruins after the conflagration of August 24, 1814. Watercolor by George Munger, displayed at the White House
- Date: September 20, 1814
- Venue: House Chamber, United States Capitol
- Location: Washington, D.C.; 38°53′23″N 77°00′32″W
- Type: State of the Union Address
- Participants: James Madison; Elbridge Gerry; Henry Clay
- Format: Written
- Previous: 1813 State of the Union Address
- Next: 1815 State of the Union Address

The 1814 State of the Union Address was given by the fourth president of the United States, James Madison, to the 13th United States Congress. It was given on Tuesday, September 20, 1814, during the height of the War of 1812. It was given during President Madison's turbulent second term.

One month after he gave the speech, the British burning of Washington occurred on August 24, and President Madison fled and lived in The Octagon House. Madison lived there until 1816, until the White House could be rebuilt. The three key points are:

- "Negotiations on foot with Great Britain, whether it should require arrangements adapted to a return of peace or further and more effective provisions for prosecuting the war.
- "Government of Great Britain that her hostile orders against our commerce would not be revoked but on conditions as impossible as unjust, whilst it was known that these orders would not otherwise cease but with a war which had lasted nearly twenty years, and which, according to appearances at that time, might last as many more; having manifested on every occasion and in every proper mode a sincere desire to arrest the effusion of blood and meet our enemy on the ground of justice and reconciliation,
- "Availing himself of fortuitous advantages, he is aiming with his undivided force a deadly blow at our growing prosperity, perhaps at our national existence. He has avowed his purpose of trampling on the usages of civilized warfare, and given earnests of it in the plunder and wanton destruction of private property." The Prince Regent proceeded with the War. King George IV, who was then Prince of Wales, was serving as Regent because his father, King George III was too mentally ill to sign executive orders funding the war.

Preceded by 1813 State of the Union Address	State of the Union addresses 1814	Succeeded by 1815 State of the Union Address
