= 1812 State of the Union Address =

Speech by US President James Madison

- Date: November 4, 1812
- Venue: House Chamber, United States Capitol
- Location: Washington, D.C.; 38°53′23″N 77°00′32″W
- Type: State of the Union Address
- Participants: James Madison; William H. Crawford; Henry Clay
- Format: Written
- Previous: 1811 State of the Union Address
- Next: 1813 State of the Union Address

The 1812 State of the Union Address was delivered by the fourth president of the United States, James Madison, on November 4, 1812. Addressing the 12th United States Congress, Madison reflected on the early stages of the War of 1812 and provided updates on the military, diplomatic, and economic situation facing the nation.

Madison began by expressing gratitude for the prosperity and health experienced by the country, but acknowledged the challenges of being at war with Great Britain. He outlined the early setbacks of the war, particularly the surrender of Detroit by General William Hull, which had been a major blow to U.S. efforts to secure the Michigan Territory and Canada. Despite this defeat, Madison praised the national spirit, noting that it had galvanized citizens from Kentucky, Ohio, Pennsylvania, and Virginia to defend the frontier.

Madison condemned the British for employing Native American allies, accusing them of inciting violence against American settlers. He contrasted the British actions with the U.S. government's policy of promoting peace and civilization among Native Americans, and he decried the brutal tactics used by British-aligned forces.

The president also addressed the American victory in the naval battle between the USS Constitution, commanded by Captain Isaac Hull, and the British frigate HMS Guerriere. This victory was hailed as proof of American naval prowess and provided a morale boost for the country.

Madison reported that diplomatic efforts to resolve the conflict had failed. Despite attempts to negotiate an armistice, Britain refused to suspend its practice of impressment of American sailors, a key issue that had led to the war. As a result, Madison urged Congress to continue the war effort and to bolster the military with additional resources.

On the economic front, Madison noted that the war had disrupted trade but reassured Congress that revenue collections were sufficient to cover government expenses and repay portions of the public debt. He also called for increased support for the nation's manufacturing sector to reduce reliance on foreign goods.

Madison concluded by reaffirming the justness of the war, stating that it was fought not for conquest but to defend American rights and sovereignty. He expressed confidence in the nation's ability to persevere and achieve a peace that would secure its maritime independence.

Preceded by 1811 State of the Union Address	State of the Union addresses 1812	Succeeded by 1813 State of the Union Address
