= 1809 State of the Union Address =

Speech by US President James Madison

- Robert Fulton’s steamboat patent (1809)
- Date: November 29, 1809
- Venue: House Chamber, United States Capitol
- Location: Washington, D.C.; 38°53′23″N 77°00′32″W
- Type: State of the Union Address
- Participants: James Madison; George Clinton; Joseph Bradley Varnum
- Format: Written
- Previous: 1808 State of the Union Address
- Next: 1810 State of the Union Address

The 1809 State of the Union Address was delivered by the fourth president of the United States, James Madison, on November 29, 1809. This was Madison's first State of the Union address, delivered to the 11th United States Congress.

Madison began by addressing the deteriorating relationship between the United States and Great Britain. He expressed deep concern over the British government’s refusal to uphold agreements made by its minister, which had led to renewed tensions. British policies, including the continuation of the Orders in Council that restricted American trade, remained a key point of contention. Madison informed Congress that a proclamation had been issued to restore the embargo on British trade, as required by law.

Madison also discussed the unresolved issue of the Chesapeake–Leopard affair, in which a British ship attacked the American frigate Chesapeake in 1807. Diplomatic efforts to seek justice and reparations for the incident had failed, and Madison lamented the lack of progress in negotiations with Britain on this matter.

Regarding France, Madison reported that efforts to address violations of U.S. commercial rights had also been unsuccessful. Although other European powers had shown less hostility, he called on Congress to consider further measures to protect American commerce, particularly from collusive attempts by foreign vessels to misuse the American flag to evade British and French blockades.

Madison touched on relations with the Barbary States and praised the peaceful state of affairs with Native American tribes. He highlighted the government's ongoing efforts to promote agriculture and industry among the southern tribes and noted their increasing integration into American society.

Madison also addressed domestic matters, including fortifications along the maritime frontier and improvements in military preparedness. He emphasized the need to further develop the U.S. militia system as the country’s primary defense force and reported on the continued progress of manufacturing and internal trade, especially given the disruptions to foreign commerce.

In closing, Madison expressed confidence in Congress’s ability to navigate the challenges posed by international conflicts, protect national interests, and maintain peace and prosperity for the American people.

Preceded by 1808 State of the Union Address	State of the Union addresses 1809	Succeeded by 1810 State of the Union Address
