= Second inauguration of James Madison =

7th United States presidential inauguration

Second presidential inauguration of James Madison
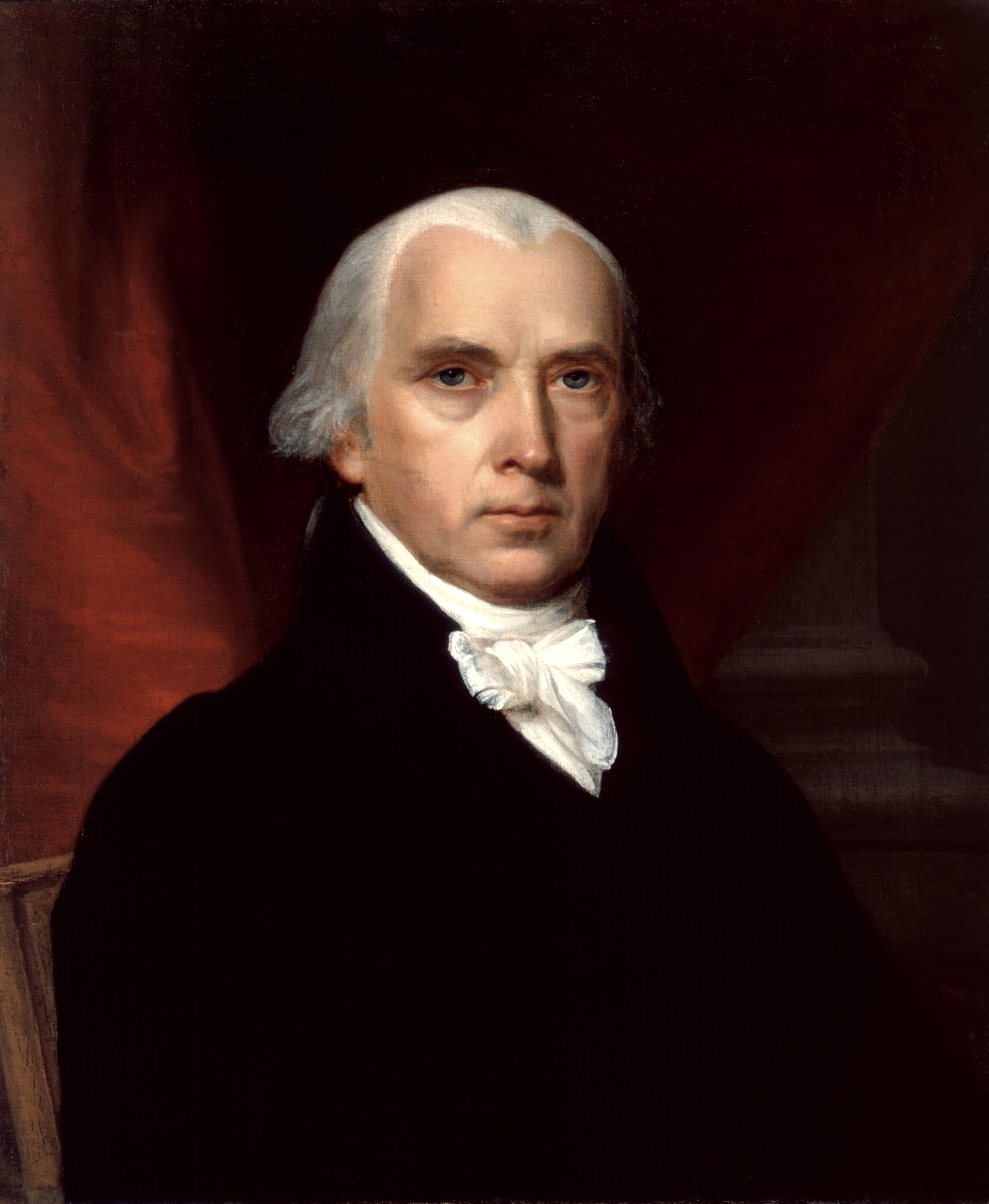
- Date: March 4, 1813; 213 years ago
- Location: United States Capitol, Washington, D.C.
- Participants: James Madison; 4th president of the United States — Assuming office John Marshall; Chief Justice of the United States — Administering oath Elbridge Gerry; 5th vice president of the United States — Assuming office John Davis; United States District Judge — Administering oath

The second inauguration of James Madison as president of the United States was held on Thursday, March 4, 1813, at the United States Capitol in Washington, D.C. The inauguration marked the commencement of the second four-year term of James Madison as president and the only term of Elbridge Gerry as vice president. The presidential oath was administered by Chief Justice John Marshall. Gerry died 1 year, 264 days into this term, and the office remained vacant for the balance of it. (Prior to ratification of the Twenty-fifth Amendment in 1967, no constitutional provision existed for filling an intra-term vacancy in the vice presidency.)

== Background and ceremony ==
During the War of 1812, incumbent Madison fended off a challenge by DeWitt Clinton, who received support from both Federalists and Republicans opposed to Madison and the war, in the 1812 United States presidential election.

On March 4, 1813, Madison arrived at the capitol with an escort of marines and cavalry. Chief Justice Marshall, a long-time enemy of Madison's, allegedly appeared disgusted when giving the oath of office. In his inaugural address, Madison summarized American grievances against the British and attempted to rally the nation around the war effort. After the inauguration, Madison and First Lady Dolley Madison hosted an inaugural ball.

== See also ==
- Presidency of James Madison
- First inauguration of James Madison
- 1812 United States presidential election
