= Compact of 1802 =

Agreement ceding the Yazoo lands

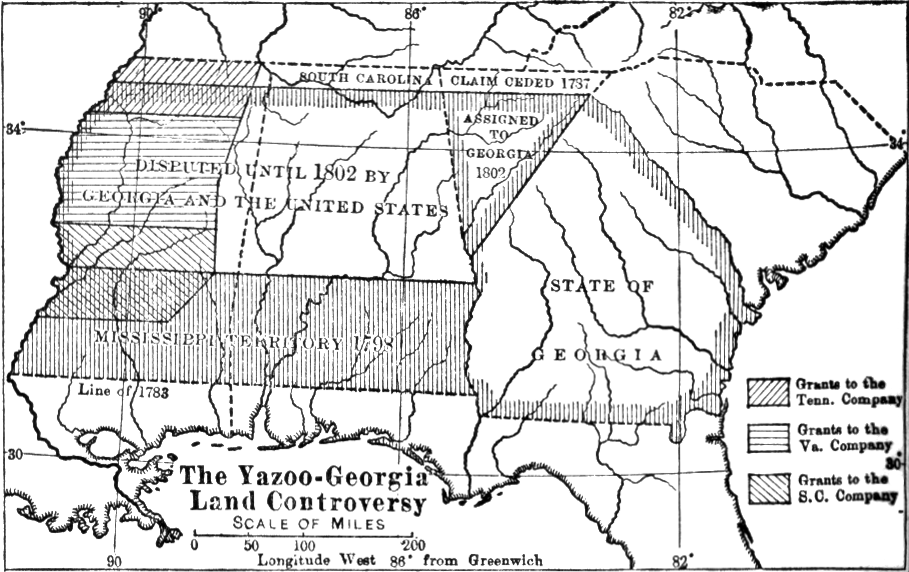
Areas involved in the Yazoo-Georgia land scandal.

The Compact of 1802, formally Articles of Agreement and Cession, was a compact between the United States and the state of Georgia entered into on April 24, 1802. In it, the United States paid Georgia 1.25 million U.S. dollars for its central and western lands (the Yazoo lands, now Alabama and Mississippi, respectively), and promised that the U.S. government would extinguish American Indian land titles in Georgia. This was the last of the post-colonial land cessions by the original states.

== Sources ==
- The Promised Land:The Cherokees, Arkansas, and Removal, 1794-1839 By Charles Russell Logan
