= First inauguration of James Madison =

6th United States presidential inauguration

First presidential inauguration of James Madison
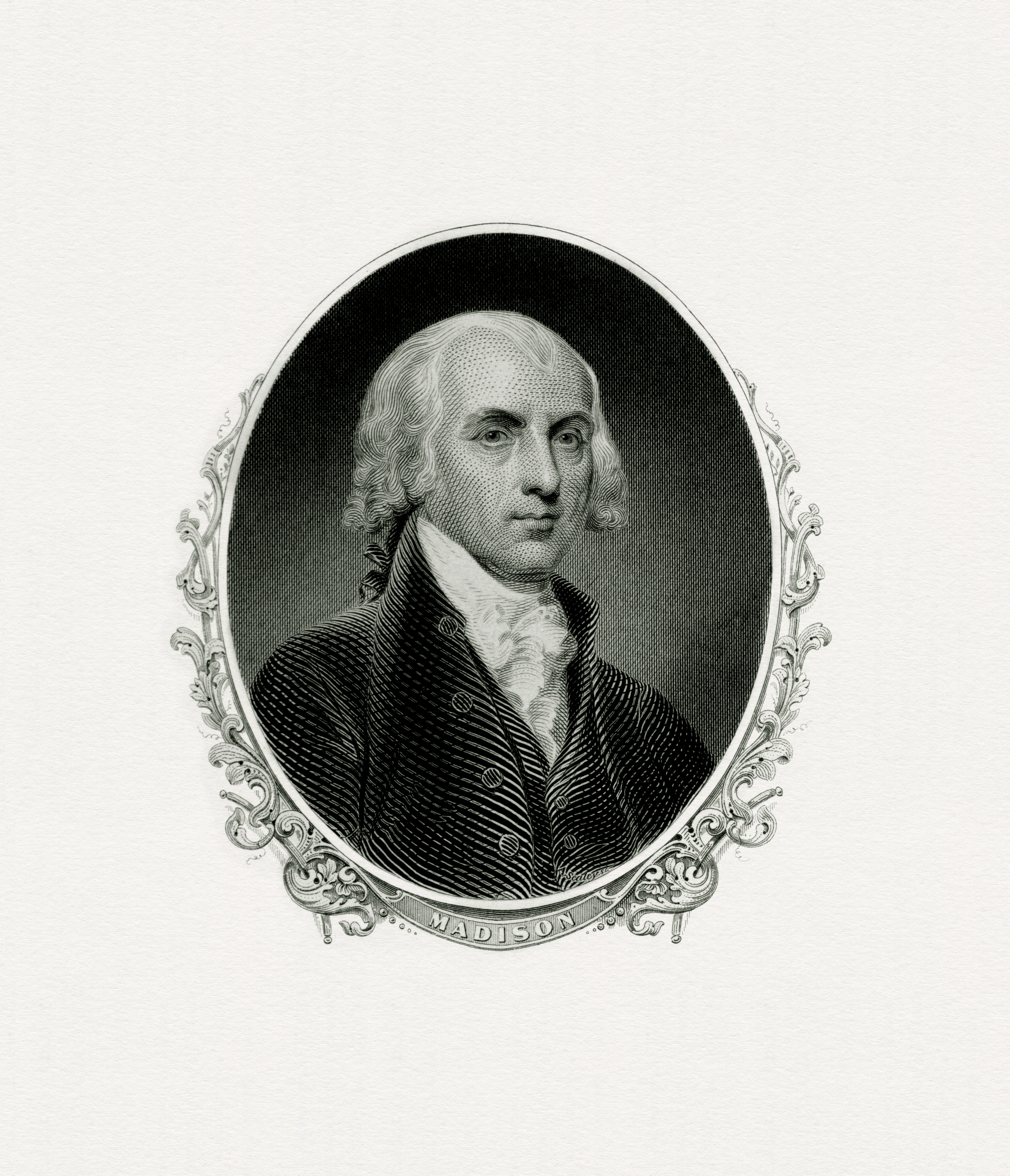
- BEP engraved portrait of Madison as president.
- Date: March 4, 1809; 217 years ago
- Location: United States Capitol, Washington, D.C.
- Participants: James Madison; 4th president of the United States — Assuming office John Marshall; Chief Justice of the United States — Administering oath George Clinton; 4th vice president of the United States — Assuming office

The first inauguration of James Madison as the fourth president of the United States was held on Saturday, March 4, 1809, in the chamber of the House of Representatives at the United States Capitol in Washington, D.C. The inauguration marked the commencement of the first four-year term of James Madison as president and the second term of George Clinton as vice president. The presidential oath was administered by Chief Justice John Marshall. The President wore a 100% American-made wool suit, and the first official inaugural ball occurred at Long's Hotel, with ticket prices being $4 (currently about $82). Clinton died 3 years, 47 days into this term, and the office remained vacant for the balance of it. (Prior to ratification of the Twenty-fifth Amendment in 1967, no constitutional provision existed for filling an intra-term vacancy in the vice presidency.) Clinton was the first vice president to die in office.

== Ceremony ==
Madison rode to the capitol on March 4, 1809 with the Washington and Georgetown cavalry escorting him. He entered the House of Representatives with Jefferson's cabinet members. President Jefferson attended the inauguration and sat beside Madison at the front of the hall. The Supreme Court Justices sat in front of Madison. According to spectators in the gallery, Madison spoke softly at first with an obvious tremble but addressed the chamber more loudly as his speech went on. The new president wore a black suit.

After the inaugural address and oath of office, Madison and his wife, Dolley Madison, welcomed visitors at their home on F Street where the huge crowd overwhelmed them. They subsequently attended an inaugural ball at Long's Hotel. Wearing a velvet dress, Dolley, the new First Lady, drew large crowds of admirers at the ball, while Madison described the occasion as exhausting and unpleasant.

== Inaugural address ==
On March 4, 1809, James Madison gave his Inaugural Address and was sworn into office as the fourth president of the United States of America. He addressed the nation on how he felt. He felt honor and responsibility in a way he could not express when elected president. He acknowledged that the United States was a country with a great deal of issues and difficulties, and the pressure of that hit him hard. He also mentioned how great the United States was and how far it has come as a country in a short period of time.

He informed the people that the country was trying to make peace and have good relations with all nations, especially with belligerent nations. He wanted to remain a neutral country as Americans progressed and built their nation. He mentioned that the US had one too many bloody and wasteful wars. "It has been the true glory of the United States to cultivate peace by observing justice."

Madison promised to meet with United States councils to make safeguards and to honor its essential interest with other nations. He wanted to build up and fund a strong military and militia, to defend the republic and the rights of the people.

Madison ended his speech with gratitude towards people in the past who had done so much for the United States, and wished the best for the future of this young thriving country.

== See also ==
- Presidency of James Madison
- Second inauguration of James Madison
- 1808 United States presidential election
