= Timeline of the Thomas Jefferson presidency =

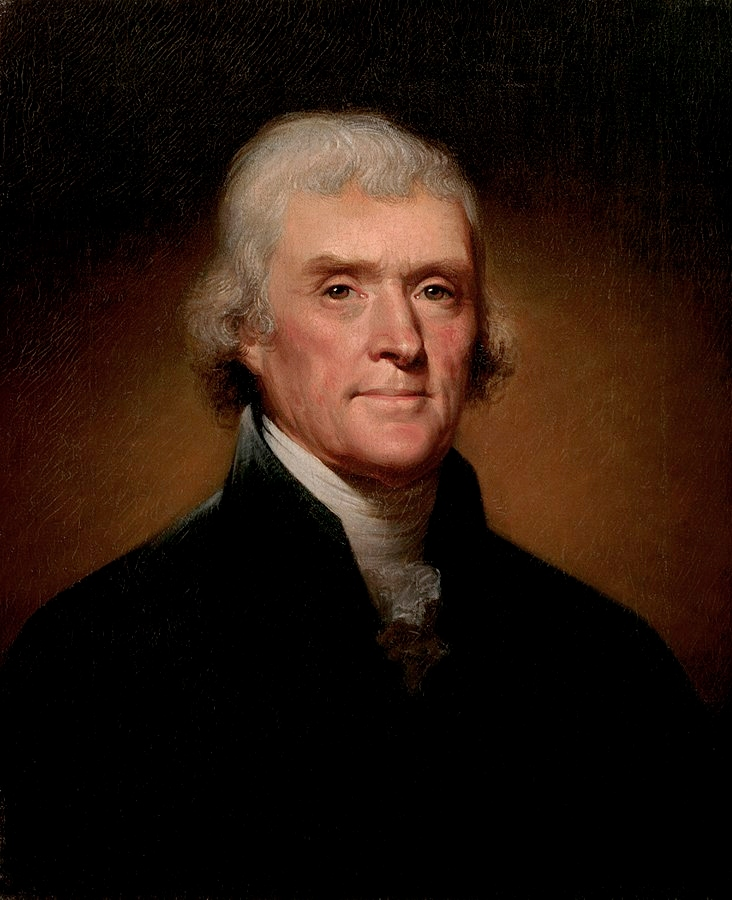
Thomas Jefferson in 1800

The presidency of Thomas Jefferson began on March 4, 1801, when Thomas Jefferson was inaugurated as the 3rd president of the United States, and ended on March 4, 1809, after two terms.

During his first term, Jefferson worked to reverse his predecessor's reshaping of the federal judiciary, and the resulting dispute led to a landmark Supreme Court ruling in Marbury v. Madison in 1803. Jefferson carried out the Louisiana Purchase the same year, significantly increasing the territory of the United States, and launched the Lewis and Clark Expedition in 1804 to survey the newly acquired lands.

The First Barbary War began two months into Jefferson's presidency after he ordered the United States Navy to combat Ottoman Tripolitania and the Barbary corsairs in the Mediterranean Sea. Peace was reached in 1805.

Jefferson responded to the Burr conspiracy in his second term when his former vice president, Aaron Burr, was allegedly plotting an insurgency in East Florida, West Florida, and the Territory of Orleans. The final two years of his presidency involved trade disputes between the United States, the United Kingdom, and France in which Jefferson authorized strict embargoes banning foreign trade.

== 1801 ==
=== March 1801 ===
- March 4 – Thomas Jefferson is inaugurated as the third president of the United States. This is the first inauguration to take place in Washington, D.C. Aaron Burr is inaugurated as vice president. Jefferson retains Samuel Dexter as Secretary of the Treasury, Benjamin Stoddert as Secretary of the Navy, and Joseph Habersham as Postmaster General.
- March 5 – Levi Lincoln becomes Attorney General and acting Secretary of State. Henry Dearborn becomes Secretary of War.
- March 8 – Jefferson holds his first Cabinet meeting.
- March 11 – Building regulations in Washington, D.C. are modified to make housing more affordable by lifting the requirement that houses be made of brick or stone.
- March 12 – Jefferson issues a pardon for David Brown, who had been convicted of sedition.
- March 16 – Jefferson issues a pardon for James T. Callender, who had been convicted of sedition.
- March 19 – Jefferson moves into the White House (then called the President's House).
- March 23 – Jefferson selects William Kilty as a recess appointment to be chief judge of the Circuit Court of the District of Columbia.

=== April 1801 ===
- April 1
  - Jefferson departs from Washington, D.C. for his home at Monticello.
  - Secretary of War Henry Dearborn becomes acting Secretary of the Navy to fill the vacancy left by Benjamin Stoddert.
- April 3 – Jefferson selects David L. Barnes to serve on the District Court for the District of Rhode Island as a recess appointment to succeed Benjamin Bourne.
- April 29 – Jefferson returns to Washington from Monticello.

=== May 1801 ===
- May 1 – James Madison arrives in Washington to stay with Jefferson.
- May 2 – James Madison becomes Secretary of State.
- May 6 – Samuel Dexter's tenure as Secretary of the Treasury ends.
- May 9 – Jefferson selects Henry Potter to serve on the U.S. Circuit Court for the Fifth Circuit as a recess appointment.
- May 14
  - Yusuf Karamanli, the pasha of Tripoli, declares war on the United States. Tripoli had demanded additional payment for protection from piracy, but the United States had refused. This begins the First Barbary War.
  - Albert Gallatin becomes Secretary of the Treasury to fill the vacancy left by Samuel Dexter.
- May 15 – Jefferson's Cabinet unanimously agrees that he should send a naval squadron to the Mediterranean.
- May 20 – Jefferson deploys ships to fight Tripoli.
- May 25 – Jefferson appoints William C. C. Claiborne as governor of the Mississippi Territory.
- May 30 – Jefferson selects Theodore Gaillard as a recess appointment to serve as chief judge of the U.S. Circuit Court for the Fifth Circuit, but Gaillard declines.

=== June 1801 ===
- June 1 – A naval squadron led by Richard Dale is sent to protect American commerce from Barbary pirates.
- June 2 – Jefferson arrives at Mount Vernon to express condolences to Martha Washington after the earlier death of her husband George Washington.
- June 6 – Jefferson appoints Charles Pinckney as Minister Plenipotentiary to Spain, serving concurrently alongside the incumbent David Humphreys.
- June 18 – The people of New Haven, Connecticut, protest following Jefferson's appointment of Samuel Bishop as collector of customs. Elizur Goodrich of the opposition Federalist Party had been appointed by President Adams, but Jefferson did not recognize the appointment. The city's predominantly Federalist population alleges that Bishop is unfit and was selected for partisan reasons.
- June 26 – The USS Enterprise reaches Gibraltar.
- June 29 – Tripoli's flagship Mashouda arrives at Gibraltar, unaware that the USS Enterprise is monitoring them.

=== July 1801 ===
- July 1 – Jefferson selects Dominic Augustin Hall to serve on the U.S. Circuit Court for the Fifth Circuit as a recess appointment.
- July 2 – The USS President, USS Essex, and USS Philadelphia arrive at Gibraltar. Richard Dale contacts Tripoli's grand admiral Murad Reis on the Mashouda to ask whether Tripoli has declared war on the United States. Murad Reis falsely tells Dale that the nations are at peace.
- July 4 – Jefferson holds the first public reception at the White House.
- July 25 – The USS Enterprise and USS President arrive at Tripoli.
- July 27 – Robert Smith becomes Secretary of the Navy to fill the vacancy left by Benjamin Stoddert.
- July 30 – Jefferson departs from Washington for his home at Monticello.
- July 31 – The Convention of 1800, which ended the Quasi-War between France and the United States, comes into effect after it is ratified by France.

=== August 1801 ===
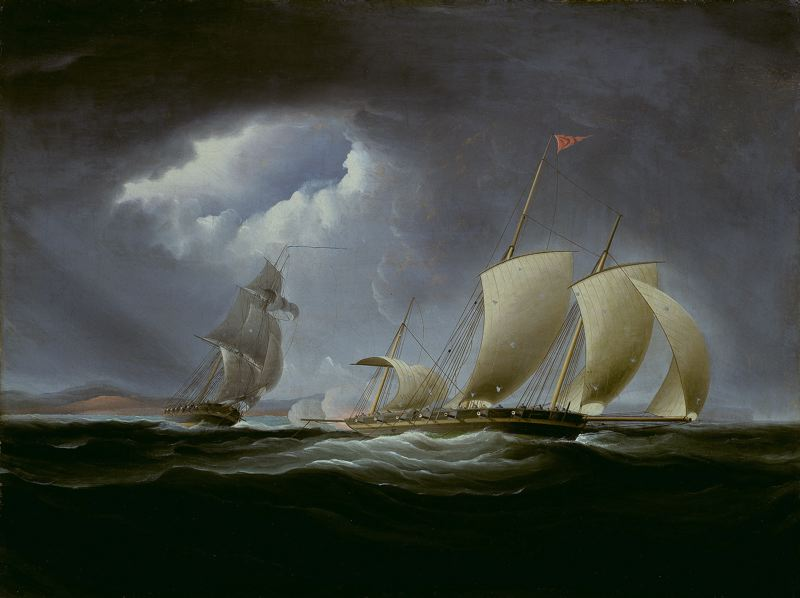
The USS Enterprise captured the Tripoli on August 1, 1801.

- August 1 – The USS Enterprise defeats the Tripolitan polacca Tripoli in the action of 1 August 1801. This is the first naval battle of the First Barbary War.
- August 22 – Jefferson's granddaughter Virginia Jefferson Randolph is born.
- August 27 – Jefferson receives a letter from an American citizen in France, informing him that Spain had transferred Louisiana to France.

=== September 1801 ===
- September 9 – William Loughton Smith ends his tenure as Minister Plenipotentiary to Portugal. A successor is not appointed and the position will remain vacant until 1810.
- September 20 – Jefferson's grandson Francis W. Eppes is born.
- September 30 – Jefferson returns to Washington from Monticello.

=== October 1801 ===
- October 22 – Jefferson selects William Stephens as a recess appointment for the District Court for the District of Georgia.
- October 24 – The United States signs the Treaty of Chickasaw Bluffs with the Chickasaw.

=== November 1801 ===
- November 28 – Gideon Granger becomes postmaster general, succeeding Joseph Habersham.

=== December 1801 ===
- December 6 – Jefferson appoints Robert R. Livingston as Minister Plenipotentiary to France after a vacancy of approximately five years.
- December 7 – The 7th United States Congress convenes for its first session.
- December 8 – Jefferson delivers the 1801 State of the Union Address in writing, breaking with tradition of reading it personally, and it is read by the Clerk of the United States House of Representatives. Following Jefferson, no president will deliver the address in person until Woodrow Wilson in his 1913 speech.
- December 17
  - Marbury v. Madison begins when William Marbury asks the Supreme Court to compel Secretary of State James Madison to honor his appointment as a judge. Marbury was one of several judges appointed by Jefferson's predecessor, John Adams, and then disregarded by Jefferson.
  - The United States signs the Treaty of Fort Adams with the Choctaw.
- December 18 – David Humphreys ends his tenure as Minister Plenipotentiary to Spain, leaving Charles Pinckney as the sole individual holding the position.
- December 19 – The Senate passes a resolution declaring the Convention of 1800 fully ratified.
- December 21 – Jefferson proclaims the Convention of 1800 between France and the United States.

== 1802 ==
=== January 1802 ===
- January 1
  - Jefferson writes to the Danbury Baptists explaining his beliefs on the separation of church and state in the United States.
  - Jefferson is gifted the Cheshire Mammoth Cheese.
- January 6 – Jefferson nominates recess appointments David Leonard Barnes, Dominic Augustin Hall, William Kilty, Henry Potter, and Williams Stephens to continue serving on their respective courts.
- January 8 – The United Kingdom and the United States negotiate American payment to British citizens per the Jay Treaty and a commission rules that the United States owes £600,000 (equivalent to $66,720,000 in 2024).
- January 26 – The national library of the United States, the Library of Congress, is established.
- January 28 – Jefferson appoints John J. Beckley as the first Librarian of Congress.

=== February 1802 ===
- February 6 – The United States Congress recognizes a state of war with Tripoli and authorizes merchant ships to arm themselves.

=== March 1802 ===
- March 8 – The Midnight Judges Act is repealed, reversing the changes John Adams had made to the federal judiciary.
- March 16
  - The United States Army is shrunk to its 1796 numbers.
  - Authorization to form the United States Military Academy of West Point is signed into law. It is intended to train military engineers.

=== April 1802 ===
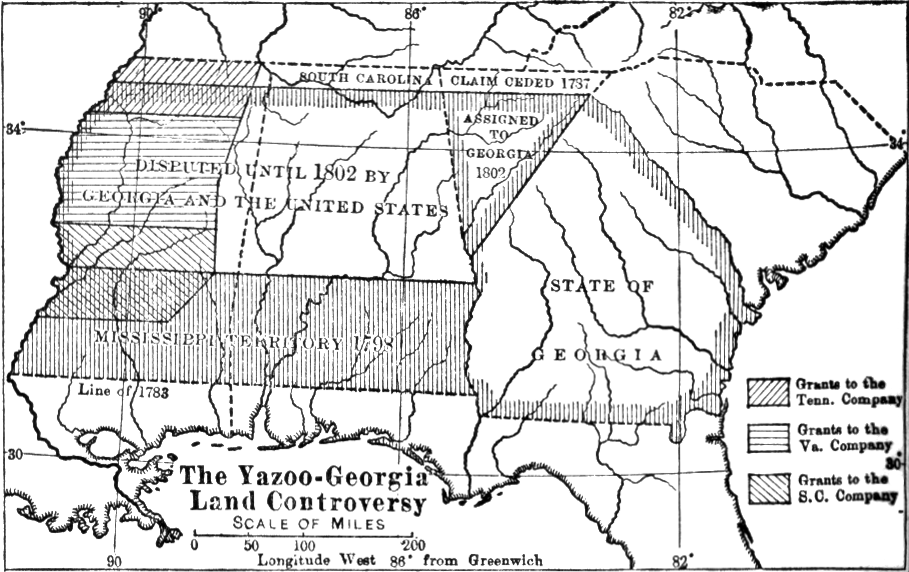
Georgia ceded its western territory, the Yazoo lands, to the federal government in April 1802.

- April 6
  - The government repeals its excise taxes on several products, including whiskey.
  - Jefferson nominates Henry Potter, his previous appointment on the Circuit Court for the Fifth Circuit, to the District Court for the Albemarle, Cape Fear & Pamptico Districts of North Carolina.
- April 14 – The Naturalization Act of 1802 replaces the Naturalization Act of 1798. It reduces the residency requirements for citizenship from fourteen years to five. It also allows citizenship for anyone under 21 when their parents become naturalized citizens.
- April 24 – Georgia cedes the Yazoo lands to the federal government.
- April 26 – The Senate ratifies the negotiations of the Jay Treaty with the United Kingdom.
- April 27 – Jefferson nominates Edward Harris to serve on the Circuit Court for the Fifth Circuit.
- April 28 – The USS Constellation arrives at Gibraltar.
- April 29
  - The Judiciary Act of 1802 reduces the number of Supreme Court justices to six and has each Supreme Court justice take a position as the head of a circuit court. It also relocates the Supreme Court to Washington, D.C.
  - Annual appropriations of $7.3 million (equivalent to $202,100,000 in 2025) are authorized to pay the public debt.
- April 30 – The Enabling Act of 1802 is signed into law, creating a path to statehood for territories organized under the Northwest Ordinance.

=== May 1802 ===
- May 3
  - Washington, D.C. is incorporated as a city. The president is granted the power to appoint the Mayor of Washington DC.
  - Edward Harris receives his commission for the Circuit Court for the Fifth Circuit.
  - The 7th United States Congress adjourns from its first session.
- May 5 – Jefferson departs from Washington for his home in Monticello.
- May 30 – Jefferson returns to Washington from Monticello.

=== June 1802 ===
- June 16 – The United States signs the Treaty of Fort Wilkinson with the Creek people.
- June 17 – The USS Franklin is captured by Tripoli.
- June 19 – Slimane of Morocco declares war against the United States in response to its blockade of the Mashouda, which he says has been transferred to Morocco, but he retracts the declaration amid negotiations.
- June 30 – The United States signs two Treaties of Buffalo Creek with the Seneca people.

=== July 1802 ===
- July – James T. Callender begins publishing criticisms of Jefferson. Previously an ally of Jefferson, Callendar felt betrayed when he was not appointed postmaster of Richmond, Virginia.
- July 1
  - The Circuit Court for the Fifth Circuit is abolished.
  - The nation's internal taxes are repealed.
- July 4 – The U.S. Military Academy at West Point opens.
- July 10 – The United Kingdom ratifies the negotiations of the Jay Treaty.
- July 15 – The negotiations of the Jay Treaty enter into force.
- July 21
  - The USS Adams arrives at Gibraltar.
  - Jefferson departs Washington for Monticello.

=== August 1802 ===
- August 11 – Spain and the United States sign a convention to resolve financial disputes.

=== September 1802 ===
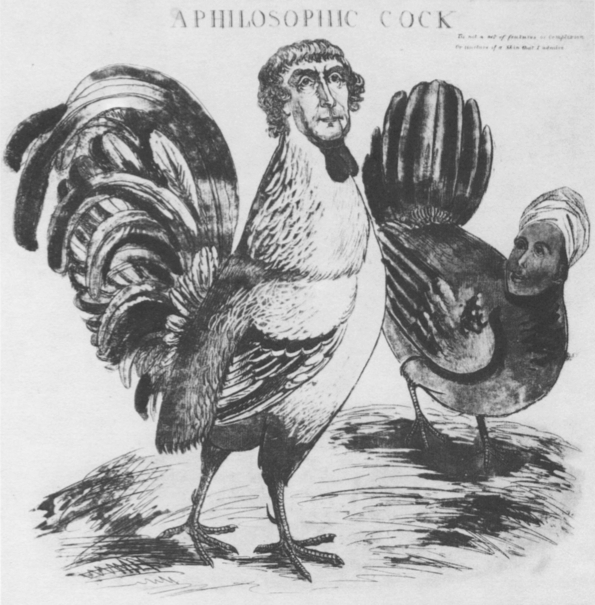
A caricature of Thomas Jefferson and his slave Sally Hemings, created after it was learned that Jefferson had children with Hemings

- September – Jefferson hosts William Thornton at Monticello.
- September 1 – James T. Callendar publishes an accusation in the Richmond Recorder alleging that Jefferson had children with his own slave, Sally Hemings.
- September 2 – William Vans Murray ends his tenure as Minister Resident to the Netherlands. A successor is not appointed and the position will remain vacant until 1815.

=== October 1802 ===
- October 3 – Jefferson returns to Washington from Monticello.
- October 16 – Juan Ventura Morales, the Spanish intendent of New Orleans, suspends the United States' right of deposit.
- October 17 – The United States signs the Treaty of Fort Confederation with the Choctaw.

=== November 1802 ===
- November 21 – Jefferson hosts his daughters in Washington for two months.
- November 22 – Jefferson removes Arthur St. Clair as governor of the Northwest Territory following St. Clair's criticism of Jefferson's Democratic–Republican Party. The territorial secretary Charles Willing Byrd remained as acting governor.

=== December 1802 ===
- December 6 – The 7th United States Congress convenes for its second session.
- December 15 – Jefferson delivers the 1802 State of the Union Address in writing.

== 1803 ==
=== January 1803 ===
- January 5 – Jefferson's daughters depart from Washington.
- January 11 – Jefferson appoints James Monroe as U.S. Minister to France and Spain alongside the incumbent minister plenipotentiaries. He tasks Monroe with negotiating the purchase of New Orleans from France as well as East Florida and West Florida from Spain.
- January 18 – Jefferson secretly asks Congress to fund commerce negotiations with Indian tribes and westward exploration.

=== February 1803 ===
- February 3 – Jefferson submits a criticism of judge John Pickering to the House.
- February 19 – Ohio is admitted as the seventeenth U.S. state.
- February 24 – The Supreme Court issues its ruling in Marbury v. Madison. It determines that the Judiciary Act of 1789 violates the Constitution and is invalidated. This sets a precedent that the Supreme Court has the power of judicial review, although it will not be exercised again until Dred Scott v. Sandford in 1857.
- February 26 – Borrowed funds are allocated to purchase New Orleans and West Florida.
- February 28
  - The Slave Trade Act of 1803 imposes a $1,000 fine (equivalent to $26,000 in 2025) for each person brought to the United States in the slave trade.
  - The Senate approves an expedition to explore the west with a budget of $2,400.

=== March 1803 ===
- March 1 – Jefferson nominates Charles Willing Byrd to a new seat on the District Court for the District of Ohio.
- March 2
  - The House determines that John Pickering should be impeached.
  - The Supreme Court issues its decision in Stuart v. Laird. It rules that the Judiciary Act of 1802 can transfer the judges of the circuit courts created by the Judiciary Act of 1801.
- March 3
  - The Militia Act of 1803 empowers the president to have state governments raise militias of up to 80,000 men.
  - The 7th United States Congress adjourns from its second session.
- March 7 – Jefferson departs from Washington for Monticello.
- March 9 – James Monroe departs for his mission to France.

=== April 1803 ===
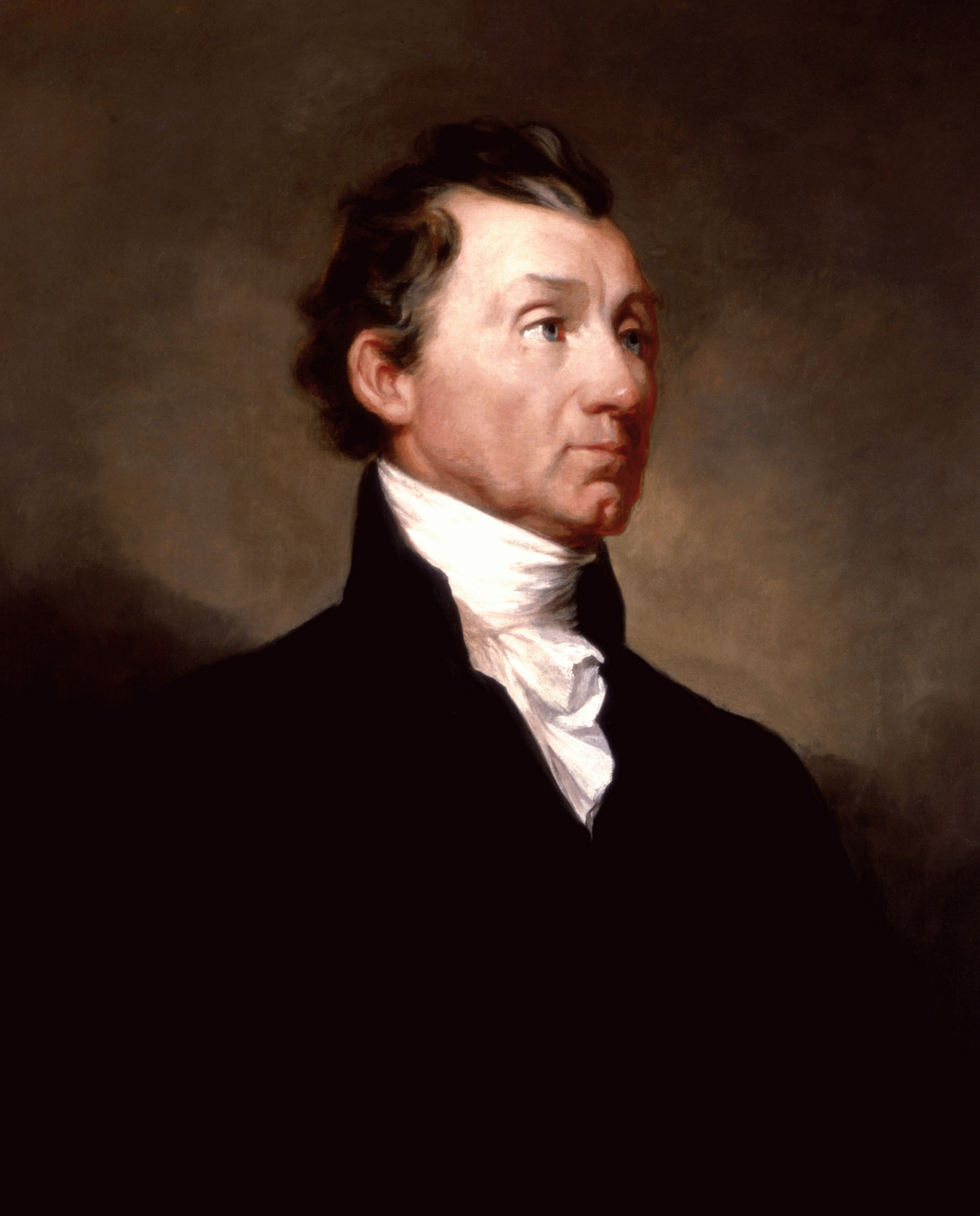
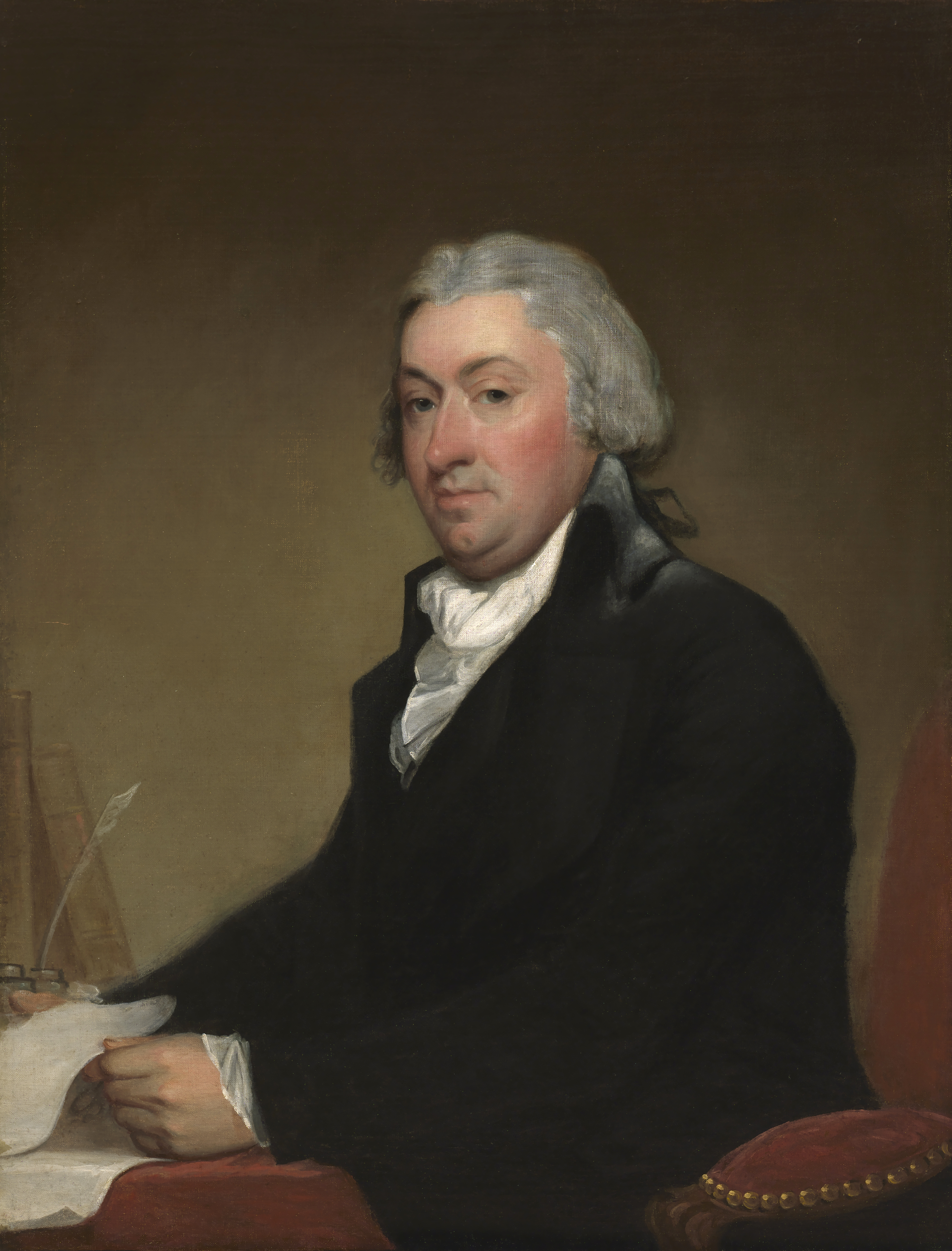
Diplomats James Monroe and Robert R. Livingston negotiated the Louisiana Purchase.
- April 3 – Jefferson returns to Washington from Monticello.
- April 8 – James Monroe arrives in France.
- April 11 – Napoleon expresses that he no longer wishes to retain Louisiana.
- April 19 – Spain allows American merchants access to New Orleans.
- April 30 – James Monroe and U.S. minister to France Robert R. Livingston sign the Louisiana Purchase. They had originally sought the purchase of only New Orleans, but Napoleon offered to sell the entirety of Louisiana. The Federalist Party accuses Jefferson of hypocrisy because he had previously criticized them for taking action that was not explicitly authorized by the Constitution, which the acquisition of territory was not.

=== May 1803 ===
- May 8 – Jefferson and his Cabinet agree that they are willing to make payments to Tripoli as a means to end the First Barbary War.
- May 12 – The USS John Adams captures the Tripolitan Meshouda.
- May 16 – Rufus King ends his tenure as Minister Plenipotentiary to the United Kingdom. The position will remain vacant until James Monroe's appointment in August.
- May 22 – France ratifies the Louisiana Purchase.
- May 23 – Jefferson sends a Navy commission commanded by Edward Preble to Tripoli.

=== June 1803 ===
- June 7 – The United States signs the Treaty of Fort Wayne with the Delaware, Eel River, Kaskaskia, Kickapoo, Miami, Piankeshaw, Potawatomi, Shawnee, and Wea peoples.

=== July 1803 ===
- July 3 – Jefferson learns that the Louisiana Purchase has been completed after Rufus King arrives in the United States with the news.
- July 4
  - The Louisiana Purchase is announced in the National Intelligencer. Jefferson proposes a constitutional amendment that would authorize the purchase, expel Indian tribes in the area, and forbid settlement north of the 33rd parallel. In October, Congress will reject the amendment but authorize the purchase.
  - Jefferson serves the Cheshire Mammoth Cheese during a celebration of the Louisiana Purchase.
- July 16 – Jefferson holds a Cabinet meeting to implement the Louisiana Purchase.
- July 19 – Jefferson departs from Washington for Monticello.

=== August 1803 ===
The Lewis and Clark Expedition traveled from Camp Dubois in present-day Illinois to Fort Clatsop in present-day Oregon.

- August 6 – The brig USS Syren is launched at Philadelphia.
- August 7 – The United States signs the Treaty of Vincennes with the Eel River, Kaskaskia, Kickapoo, Piankeshaw, and Wyandot peoples.
- August 13 – The United States signs the Treaty of Vincennes with the Kaskaskia.
- August 17
  - Jefferson receives news that France was reconsidering the Louisiana Purchase. He urges quick passage of the agreement and decides not to seek a constitutional amendment to authorize presidential purchase of territory.
  - Jefferson appoints James Monroe as Minister Plenipotentiary to the United Kingdom to fill the vacancy left by Rufus King.
- August 21 – The brig USS Argus is launched at Boston.
- August 31
  - Meriwether Lewis begins traveling from Pittsburgh to join William Clark as co-leaders of the Lewis and Clark Expedition.
  - The United States signs the Treaty of Hoe Buckintoopa with the Choctaw.

=== September 1803 ===
- September 25 – Jefferson returns to Washington from Monticello.

=== October 1803 ===
- October – Jefferson hosts newly elected Congressmen John Wayles Eppes and Thomas Mann Randolph Jr. in Washington.
- October 17
  - The 8th United States Congress convenes for its first session.
  - Jefferson delivers the 1803 State of the Union Address in writing.
- October 20 – The Senate ratifies the Louisiana Purchase.
- October 21 – The Louisiana Purchase enters into force.
- October 31
  - The USS Philadelphia surrenders to Tripoli, having run aground in Tripoli harbor.
  - Stock certifications totaling $11,250,000 (equivalent to $293,140,000 in 2025) are authorized to pay for the Louisiana Purchase.

=== November 1803 ===
- November 10 – Funding is authorized for the Louisiana Purchase.
- November 21 – Jefferson appoints Nicholas Battaile Fitzhugh to the Circuit Court of the District of Columbia.
- November 30 – Spain formally gives France the territory of Louisiana, which France has already agreed to sell to the United States.

=== December 1803 ===
- December 2 – Jefferson dines with Anthony Merry, the United Kingdom's minister to the United States. Merry had expected a formal affair and was insulted when Jefferson did not seat his guests by rank or wear formal attire.
- December 9 – The Twelfth Amendment to the United States Constitution is passed by Congress and sent to the states for ratification. It ends the practice of selecting the runner-up of presidential elections to be vice president. This followed the difficulty of resolving the 1800 presidential election.
- December 19 – The Bankruptcy Act of 1800, which established federal bankruptcy law, is repealed.
- December 20 – The flag of the United States is raised in New Orleans to inaugurate the Louisiana Purchase. Mississippi Territory governor William C. C. Claiborne is appointed governor of the Orleans Territory.

== 1804 ==
=== January 1804 ===
- January 4 – Congressman John Randolph calls for an investigation into Supreme Court Justice Samuel Chase.
- January 6 – The Senate receives articles of impeachment for judge John Pickering.
- January 9 – The Senate ratifies a treaty with Spain to resolve financial disputes. The convention was originally signed in August 1802, and it will not be ratified by Spain until July 1818.
- January 17 – Jefferson announces that he will run for a second term as president.
- January 26 – Aaron Burr visits Jefferson at the White House offering to end their political dispute in exchange for a political appointment, but Jefferson refuses.

=== February 1804 ===
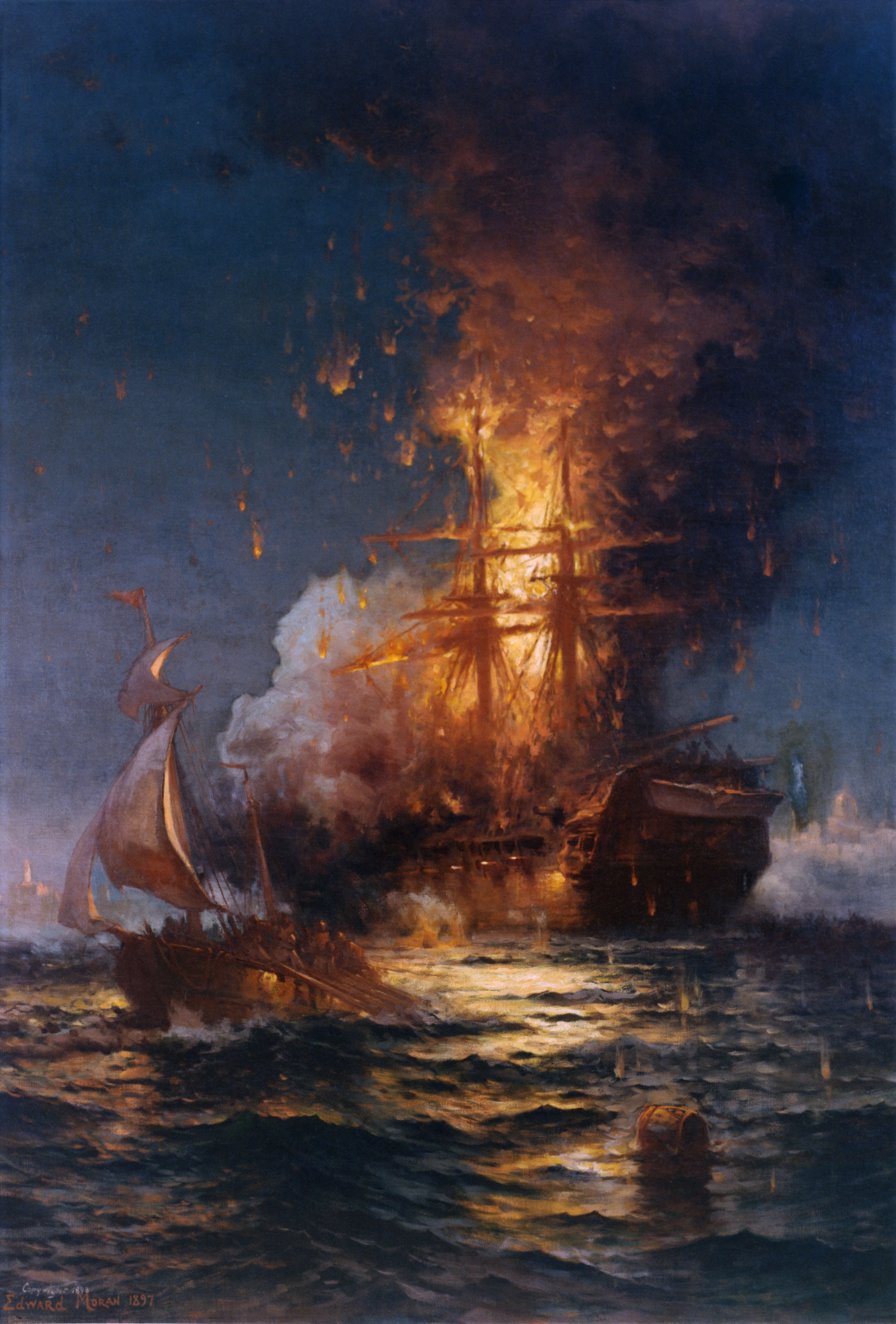
Stephen Decatur burned the USS Philadelphia on February 16, 1804, to keep it from enemy hands.

- February 15 – Jefferson's daughter Mary Jefferson Eppes gives birth to Maria Jefferson Eppes. The birth is premature and causes the mother's health to decline.
- February 16 – Stephen Decatur burns the USS Philadelphia at the harbor in Tripoli, denying it from the state of Tripoli following its capture the previous October.
- February 25 – The Democratic-Republican Party nominates Jefferson as its presidential candidate and George Clinton as its vice presidential candidate.

=== March 1804 ===
- March 6 – A House committee led by John Randolph delivers articles of impeachment for Justice Samuel Chase.
- March 12
  - Justice Samuel Chase is impeached on charges of using his position for political purposes.
  - The Senate finds judge John Pickering guilty in his impeachment trial.
- March 13 – Jefferson writes to William Dunbar proposing what would become the Dunbar and Hunter Expedition. Although the original proposal was to explore the Red River, fears that the Spanish and the Osage would cause conflict led Dunbar and Hunter to explore the Ouachita River and present-day Arkansas instead.
- March 21 – The USS Syren captures a Tripolitan ship which becomes the USS Scourge.
- March 22 – Jefferson nominates William Johnson to succeed Alfred Moore on the Supreme Court of the United States. He nominates John S. Sherburne to the District Court for the District of New Hampshire
- March 23 – The National Bank Act of 1804 authorizes offices of discount and deposit in territories outside of the states.
- March 26
  - The Louisiana Territory Act establishes the District of Louisiana and the Territory of Orleans from the Louisiana Purchase.
  - The Land Act of 1804 reduces the lower limit of public land purchases from 320 acres to 160 acres and authorized annual installments.
  - Jefferson selects William A. Burwell as secretary to the president.
  - William Johnson and John S. Sherburne receive their judicial commissions.
- March 27 – The 8th United States Congress adjourns from its first session.

=== April 1804 ===
- April 1 – Jefferson departs from Washington for Monticello.
- April 17 – Jefferson's daughter Mary Jefferson Eppes dies of complications from childbirth at the age of 25.

=== May 1804 ===
- May 13 – Jefferson returns to Washington from Monticello.

=== June 1804 ===
- June 4 – Jefferson dines with Charles Willson Peale and Alexander von Humboldt.
- June 12 – Former consul Richard Henry O'Brien is sent to negotiate with Tripoli and offers $60,000 to end the war. Tripoli rejects the offer and refuses him entry.
- June 13 – Abigail Adams writes to Jefferson expressing her condolences for the death of his daughter. The two briefly maintain cordial relations, but political animosity returns.
- June 15 – The Twelfth Amendment is ratified in time to establish new procedures for the 1804 presidential election.
- June 16 – Jefferson orders the recall of Richard Valentine Morris from the Mediterranean for his failure during the First Barbary War, to be replaced by Edward Preble. Upon returning to the United States, Morris will be court-martialed and dismissed from the Navy.

=== July 1804 ===
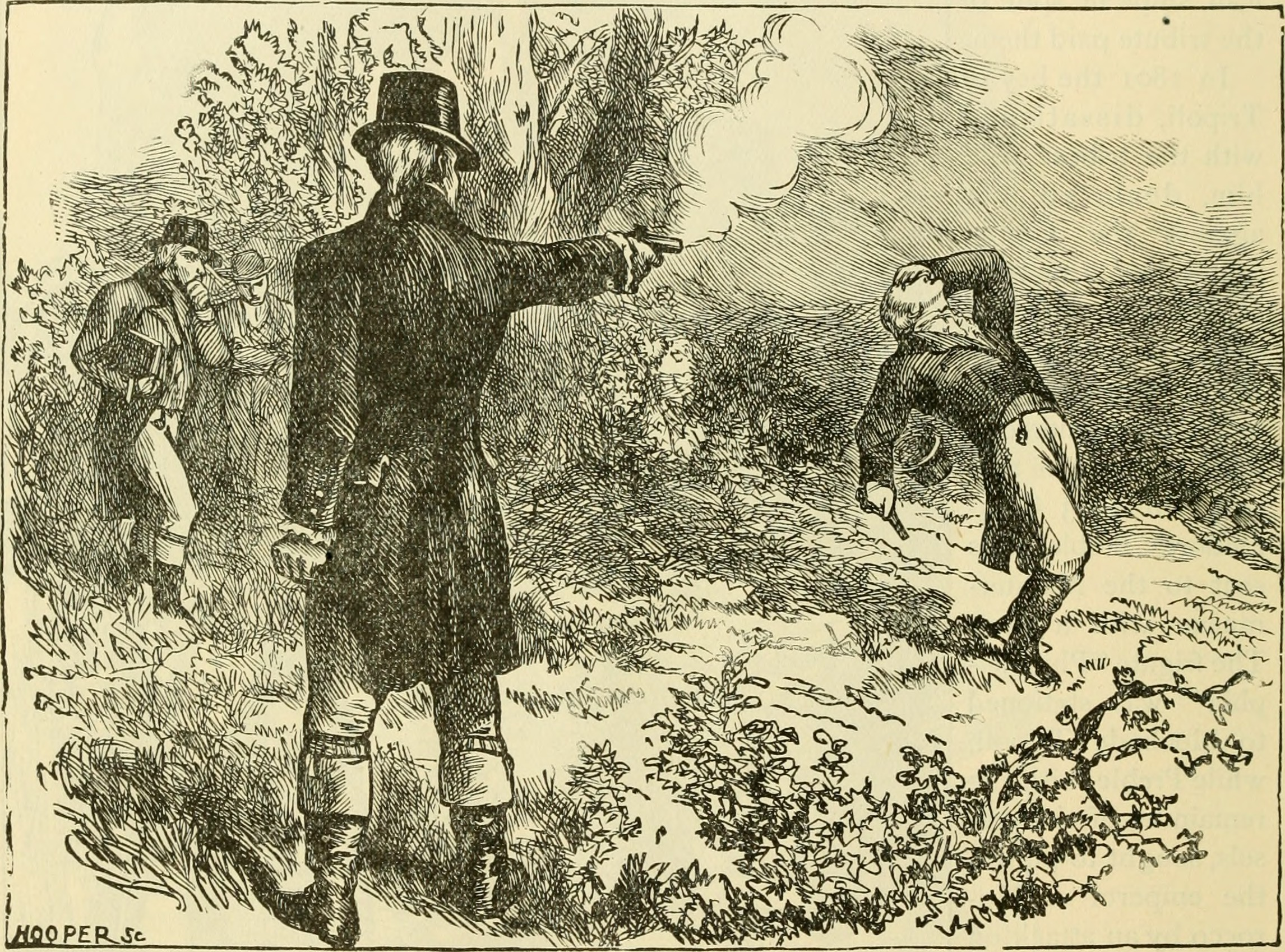
Aaron Burr killed Alexander Hamilton in a duel on July 11, 1804.

- July 11 – Vice President Aaron Burr fatally shoots Alexander Hamilton in a duel. Burr had been campaigning for the 1804 New York gubernatorial election when he was insulted by Hamilton, prompting him to challenge Hamilton to a duel. Burr is condemned by the public and will flee west after his vice presidency ends. Jefferson avoids making public comment on Hamilton's death.
- July 12 – Hamilton dies from his gunshot wound inflicted by Burr.
- July 23 – Jefferson departs from Washington for Monticello.

=== August 1804 ===
- August 3 – The USS Constitution begins shelling Tripoli. The ensuing battle goes on until September 11.
- August 11 – Edward Preble offers the pasha of Tripoli $120,000 to end the war, but he receives no reply.
- August 18 – The United States signs the Treaty of Vincennes with the Delaware.
- August 24 – Edward Preble resumes the shelling of Tripoli after receiving no reply to his peace offer.
- August 27 – The United States signs the Treaty of Vincennes with the Piankeshaw.

=== September 1804 ===
- September 4 – The USS Intrepid is destroyed during its attack on Tripoli.
- September 10 – James Barron succeeds Edward Preble as commodore.
- September 11 – The Second Battle of Tripoli Harbor ends.
- September 30 – Jefferson returns to Washington from Monticello.

=== October 1804 ===
- October 24 – The United States signs the Treaty of Tellico with the Cherokee.

=== November 1804 ===
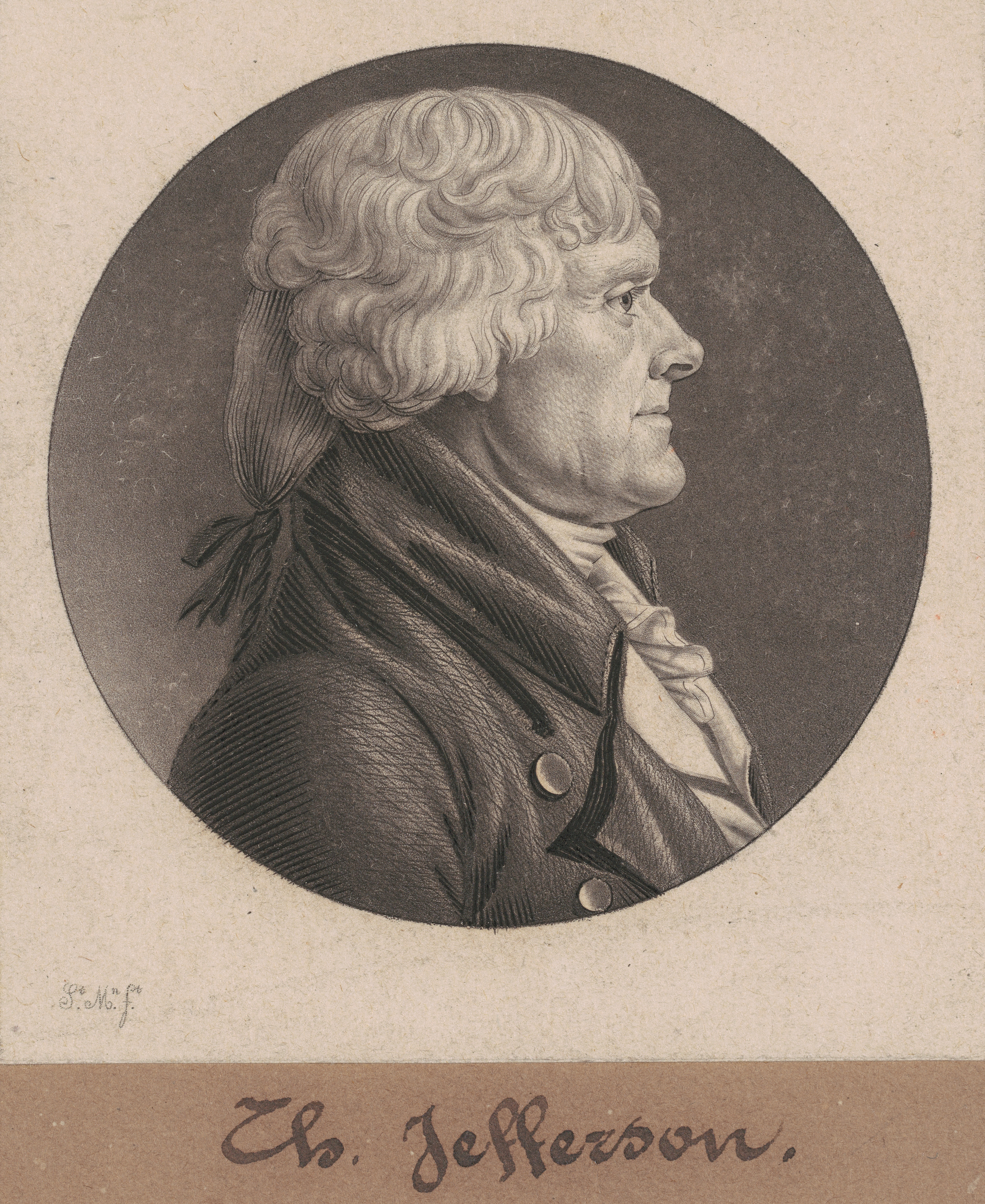
The portrait of Thomas Jefferson by Charles Balthazar Julien Févret de Saint-Mémin

- November – Jefferson sits for a portrait by Charles Balthazar Julien Févret de Saint-Mémin.
- November 3 – The United States signs the Treaty of St. Louis with the Fox and Sauk peoples.
- November 5 – The 8th United States Congress convenes for its second session.
- November 8 – Jefferson delivers the 1804 State of the Union Address in writing.
- November 13 – The 1804 United States elections take place. Jefferson runs against Federalist Charles Pinckney in the presidential election.
- November 18 – John Armstrong Jr. succeeds Robert R. Livingston as Minister Plenipotentiary to France.

=== December 1804 ===
- December 4 – The House adopts its articles of impeachment against Justice Samuel Chase.
- December 5 – Jefferson is declared the winner of the 1804 presidential election. George Clinton, previously the Governor of New York, is elected vice president.
- December 31 – Levi Lincoln's tenure as attorney general ends.

== 1805 ==
=== January 1805 ===
- January 11 – The creation of the Michigan Territory, using land of the Indiana Territory, is authorized. Detroit is named its capital.
- January 18
  - Jefferson sends orders instructing negotiators to avoid making payments in peace talks for the First Barbary War, but to offer ransoms for prisoners if talks fail.
  - Isaac Coles becomes secretary to the president after William A. Burwell requests a temporary leave.

=== February 1805 ===
- February 4 – The impeachment trial of Samuel Chase begins.
- February 23 – An agreement written by General William Eaton is signed with Hamet Karamanli, who had been next in line to rule Tripoli, to restore him as pasha.

=== March 1805 ===
- March 1
  - The impeachment trial of Samuel Chase ends in acquittal.
  - Jefferson appoints William Hull as governor of Michigan Territory.
  - Jefferson appoints Daniel D. Tompkins to the District Court for the District of New York, but he declines.
- March 2 – Vice President Aaron Burr departs from Washington D.C.
- March 3
  - The District of Louisiana is reorganized as the Louisiana Territory.
  - The 8th United States Congress adjourns from its second session.
- March 4 – Jefferson is inaugurated for his second term as president.
- March 8 – William Eaton and Hamet Karmanli lead their forces on a march through the desert in northern Africa.
- March 14 – Jefferson departs from Washington for Monticello.

=== April 1805 ===
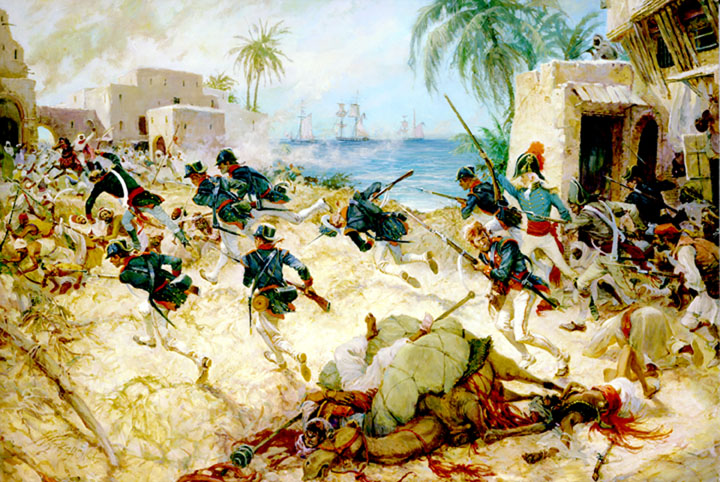
Derna was the subject of a major battle on April 27, 1805.

- April – The Red River Expedition begins.
- April 7 – The Lewis and Clark Expedition delivers a report on its progress so far and leaves Fort Mandan in present-day North Dakota.
- April 8 – Jefferson dines with Burr for the last time. He ends his cordial relationship with Burr the following week when he learns Burr is challenging the legitimacy of Jefferson's election in 1801.
- April 17 – Jefferson returns to Washington from Monticello.
- April 26 – The Lewis and Clark Expedition reaches the mouth of the Yellowstone River in present-day Montana.
- April 27 – The United States Marine Corps and Arab mercenaries, led by William Eaton and Hamet Karamanli, respectively, capture the port city of Derna in Tripoli.

=== May 1805 ===
- May – Jefferson appoints Robert Williams as governor of the Mississippi Territory.
- May 13 – Algerian pasha Hussein Dey launches an attack on American-occupied Derna, but is defeated.
- May 16 – Jefferson appoints Henry Brockholst Livingston to the District Court for the District of New York as a recess appointment, but Livingston declines the commission.
- May 19 – Commodore James Barron informs Hamet Karamanli that the United States will stop supplying him financial and military aid outside of naval support.
- May 26 – Three American frigates arrive in the harbor of Tripoli displaying a truce flag to begin negotiations.
- May 28 – Hussein Dey launches another attack on American-occupied Derna, but is defeated.
- May 29 – Tripoli's pasha Yusuf Karamanli reduces his request for peace from $200,000 to $130,000.
- May 31 – The American envoy to Tripoli, Tobias Lear, informs Yusuf Karamanli that the United States is willing to pay $60,000 to end the First Barbary War.

=== June 1805 ===
- June – Gilbert Stuart paints the Edgehill portrait and Medallion profile of Jefferson.
- June 2 – Tripoli releases the 297 prisoners it had captured from the USS Philadelphia following a payment of $277 per person.
- June 4 – The First Barbary War ends with the signing of the Treaty of Tripoli.
- June 10 – Hussein Dey launches another attack on Derna, having not yet received news that the war had ended.
- June 12 – Jefferson selects Matthias B. Tallmadge as a recess appointment to the District Court for the District of New York.
- June 30 – The Michigan Territory is organized.

=== July 1805 ===
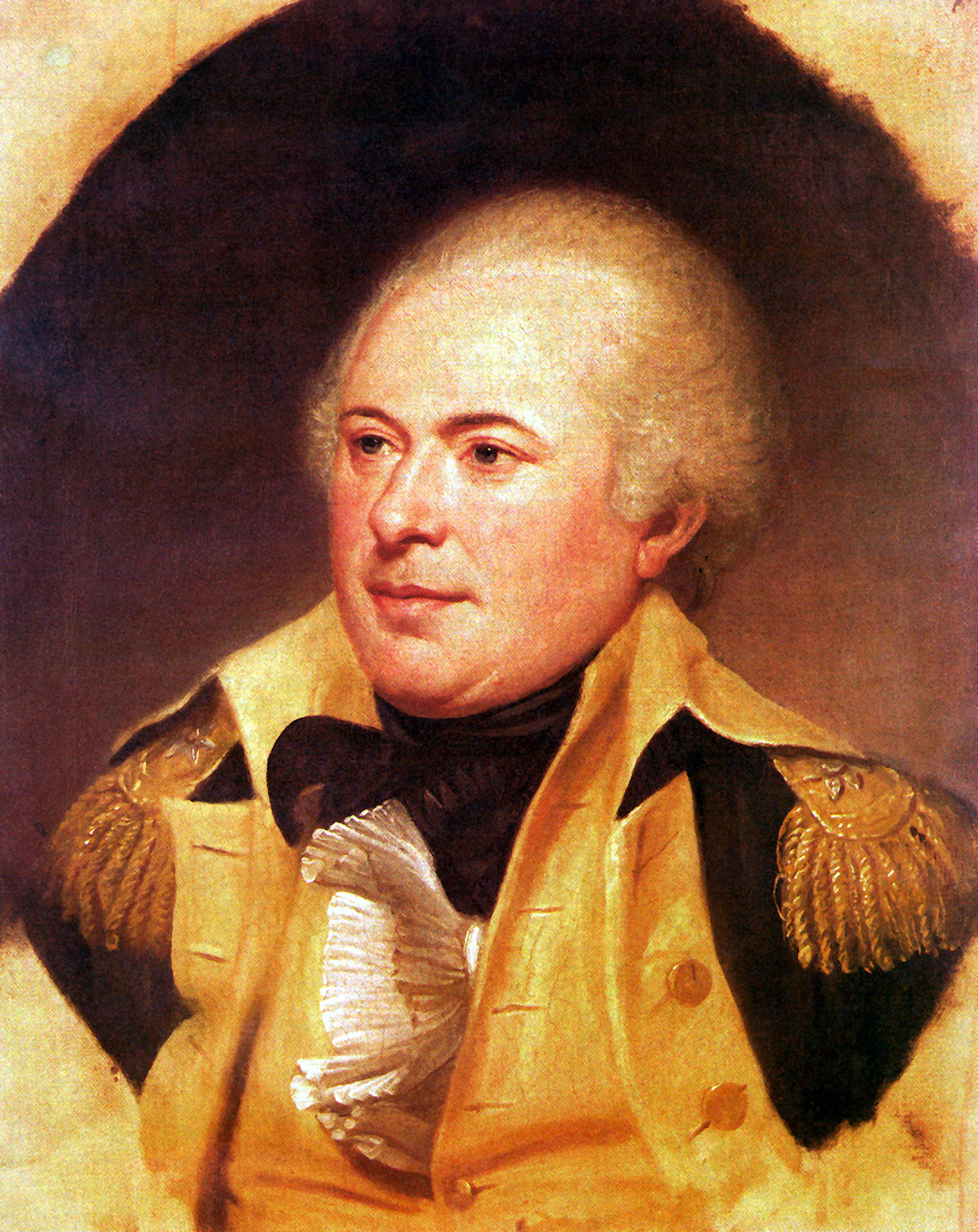
James Wilkinson was the first governor of the Louisiana Territory.

- July 4
  - Jefferson appoints James Wilkinson as governor of the Louisiana Territory.
  - The United States signs the Treaty of Fort Industry with the Delaware, Chippewa, Munsee, Ottawa, Potawatomi, Shawnee, and Wyandot peoples.
- July 15 – Jefferson departs from Washington for Monticello.
- July 23
  - The United Kingdom invokes the Rule of 1756 to seize American ships in neutral ports.
  - Former Vice President Aaron Burr arrives in New Orleans amid rumors that he intends to form his own country.
  - The United States signs the Treaty of Chickasaw County with the Chickasaw.
- July 25 – The USS Hornet is launched at Baltimore, Maryland.
- July 30 – All eighteen American warships in the Mediterranean arrive at the Gulf of Tunis, making up the largest gathering of American Naval forces to that point in history. John Rodgers demands that Tunisian leader Hammuda ibn Ali confirm that Tunis will not seek war with the United States. Peace is negotiated over the following days.

=== August 1805 ===
- August 7 – John Breckinridge becomes attorney general to fill the vacancy left by Levi Lincoln.
- August 12 – The Lewis and Clark Expedition reaches the Continental Divide in present-day Montana.
- August 21 – The United States signs the Treaty of Grouseland with the Delaware, Eel River, Miami, Potawatomi, and Wea peoples.

=== September 1805 ===
- September – Jefferson hosts secretary of war Henry Dearborn at Monticello.
- September 6 – News of the Treaty of Tripoli reaches the United States.
- September 15 – Jefferson receives a letter from George Morgan reporting on Burr's attempt to recruit Morgan's sons.
- September 23 – The United States signs the Treaty of St. Peters with the Sioux.

=== October 1805 ===
- October 3 – Jefferson returns to Washington from Monticello.
- October 20 – Jefferson receives a letter from Postmaster General Gideon Granger, reporting that Burr had tried to recruit General William Eaton.
- October 22 – Jefferson and his Cabinet decide to send soldiers and gunboats to New Orleans in response to Burr's activity.
- October 24 – Jefferson and his Cabinet decide to send Captain Edward Preble and Captain Stephen Decatur to lead a naval defense of New Orleans.
- October 25
  - Charles Pinckney's tenure as Minister Plenipotentiary to Spain ends. He is succeeded by George William Erving as Chargé d'Affaires ad interim.
  - The United States signs the Treaty of Tellico with the Cherokee.
- October 27 – The United States signs the Cotton Gin Treaty with the Cherokee.

=== November 1805 ===
- November 7 – The Lewis and Clark Expedition reaches the West Coast.
- November 14 – The United States signs the Treaty of Washington with the Creeks.
- November 16 – The United States signs the Treaty of Mount Dexter with the Choctaw.

=== December 1805 ===
- December 2 – The 9th United States Congress convenes for its first session.
- December 3 – Jefferson delivers the 1805 State of the Union Address in writing. He delivers a second message to Congress secretly to inform them he is negotiating additional territorial acquisitions with France and needs funding.
- December 6
  - Jefferson privately informs Congress he would like to move toward a deal to purchase the Floridas from Spain. He deliberately avoids details to avoid controversy, but he informs Congressman John Randolph that his goal is to allocate $2 million for the deal. Randolph opposes on the grounds that it would be embarrassing to pay after negotiations failed.
  - Venezuelan revolutionary Francisco de Miranda arrives in Washington.
- December 20 – Jefferson nominates his previous recess appointment Matthias B. Tallmadge to the District Court for the District of New York.
- December 30 – The United States signs the Treaty of Vincennes with the Piankashaw.

== 1806 ==
=== January 1806 ===
- January 3 – John Randolph moves to raise soldiers on the border with Spanish Florida. The debate takes place over a week before it is decided to accept a motion from Jefferson's ally Barnabas Bidwell to allocate $2 million.
- January 7 – The United States signs the Cotton Gin Treaty with the Cherokee.
- January 17
  - Jefferson delivers a message to Congress on neutral commerce.
  - Jefferson's grandson James Madison Randolph is born in the White House. This is the first birth to take place in the building.
  - Matthias B. Tallmadge receives his commission to serve on the District Court for the District of New York.
- January 27 – James Wilkinson is confirmed as governor of the Louisiana Territory.

=== February 1806 ===
- February 7 – The Senate passes the Two Million Act to fund the acquisition of Spanish Florida.
- February 21 – Jefferson nominates Pierpont Edwards to the District Court for the District of Connecticut. He nominates William Cranch of the Circuit Court of the District of Columbia to the court's chief judge seat to fill a vacancy left by William Kilty.
- February 28 – Jefferson nominates Allen Bowie Duckett to fill the vacancy left by William Cranch on the Circuit Court of the District of Columbia.

=== March 1806 ===
John Randoplph, previously an ally of Jefferson, publicly split with him on March 5, 1806.

- March 5 – John Randolph publicly splits with Jefferson.
- March 17 – Allen Bowie Duckett receives his commission for the Circuit Court of the District of Columbia.
- March 23 – The Lewis and Clark Expedition begins moving east to return to the United States.
- March 29 – Congress authorizes a commission to plan the Cumberland Road from Cumberland, Maryland, to Weeling, Virginia (present-day West Virginia) to assist with transportation to and from the Ohio River.

=== April 1806 ===
- April 12 – The Senate ratifies the June 1805 peace treaty with Tripoli.
- April 17 – The peace treaty with Tripoli enters into force.
- April 18 – The Non-Importation Act restricts imports from the United Kingdom in response to British seizures of American ships. It is set to take effect on November 15, but enforcement is postponed while negotiations continue.
- April 19
  - Jefferson nominates Monroe and William Pinkney to negotiate with the United Kingdom and resolve naval conflict between the nations.
  - Jefferson nominates James Houston to the District Court for the District of Maryland.
- April 21
  - The office of Superintendent of Indian Trade is established to oversee government trading posts with Native American tribes.
  - The Enforcement of Counterfeiting Prevention Act establishes penalties for counterfeiting and grants marshals and district attorneys investigative and prosecutory powers.
  - The 9th United States Congress adjourns from its first session.
- April 25 – HMS Leander fires a warning shot at American shipping vessels and inadvertently kills an American sailor.

=== May 1806 ===
- May 6 – Jefferson departs from Washington for Monticello.
- May 31 – The bomb ketch USS Vesuvius is launched at Newburyport, Massachusetts.

=== June 1806 ===
- June 7 – Jefferson returns to Washington from Monticello.
- June 8 – George Wythe, Jefferson's mentor, dies after being poisoned.

=== July 1806 ===
- July 14 – Joseph Hamilton Daveiss writes to Jefferson accusing Burr of inciting rebellion in Spanish territory. This follows about five months of letters from Daveiss expressing concerns about Burr.
- July 15 – The Pike Expedition begins when Zebulon Pike travels to the present-day Southwestern United States.
- July 21 – Jefferson departs from Washington for Monticello.

=== August 1806 ===
- August – Jefferson stays at Poplar Forest.
- August 16 – Louisiana Territory governor James Wilkinson leaves the Louisiana Territory on Jefferson's orders. Although he retains his title as governor of the Louisiana Territory, the territorial secretary Joseph Brown becomes acting governor.
- August 27 – Monroe and Pinkney begin negotiations with Lord Holland of the United Kingdom.

=== September 1806 ===
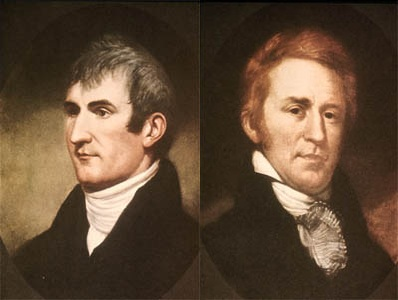
Meriwether Lewis (left) and William Clark (right) finished their expedition on September 23, 1806.

- September 23 – The Lewis and Clark Expedition ends when it arrives in St. Louis.

=== October 1806 ===
- October 4 – Jefferson returns to Washington from Monticello.
- October 21
  - Louisiana governor James Wilkinson, fearing he would be implicated in the Burr conspiracy, sends a letter to Jefferson warning him of the pending revolt without disclosing his knowledge of Burr's leadership.
  - Congress establishes an organizational structure for the military.
- October 22 – The Cabinet meets over several days to discuss Burr's actions. They initially decide to send a naval force to New Orleans, but instead they send John Graham to collect information and prepare local authorities.

=== November 1806 ===
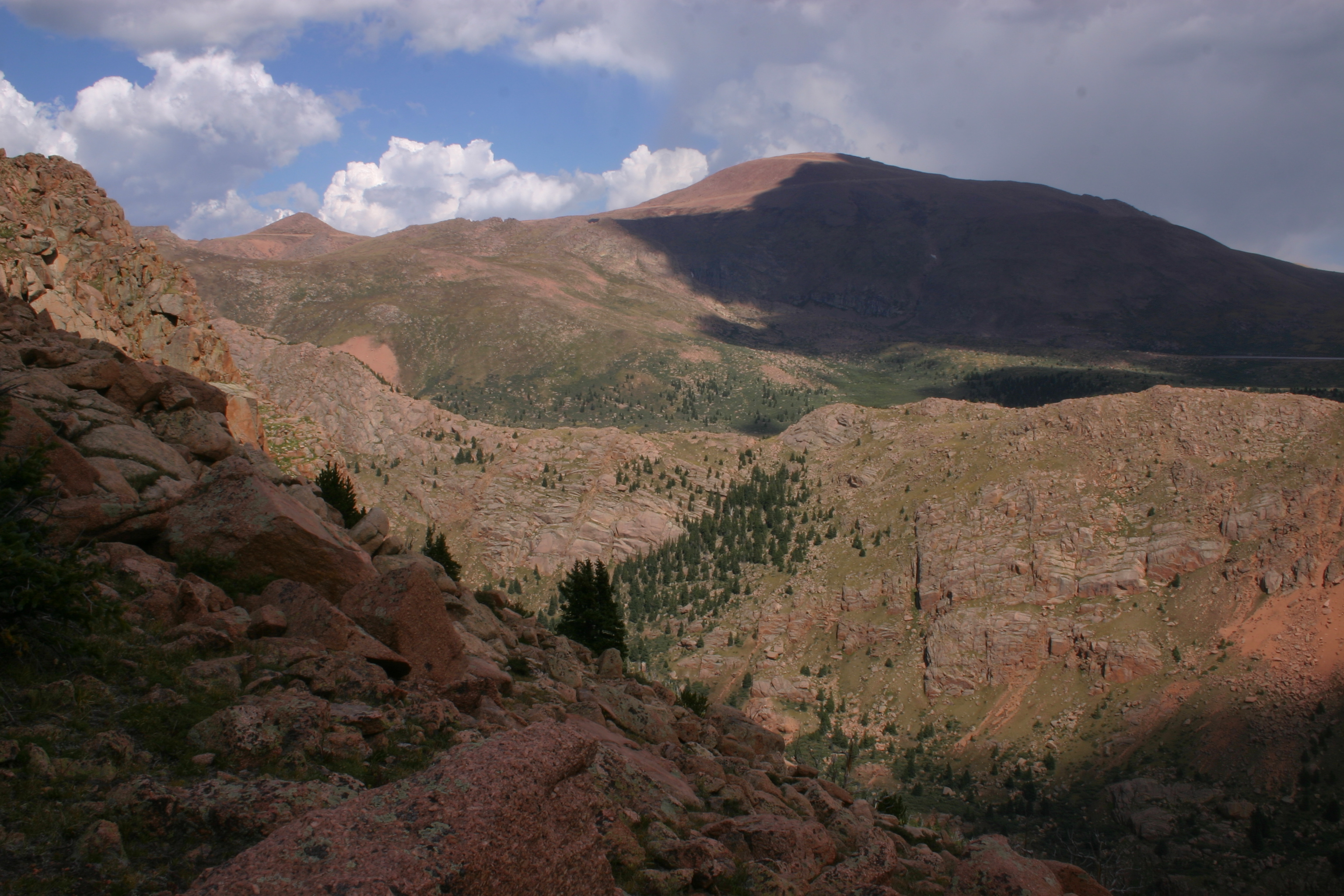
The Pike Expedition reached Pikes Peak in present-day Colorado on November 15, 1806.

- November 5 – Governor James Wilkinson signs the neutral ground agreement with Spanish colonel Simón de Herrera.
- November 10 – Jefferson selects Henry Brockholst Livingston to serve on the Supreme Court as a recess appointment.
- November 15 – The Pike Expedition reaches the mountain that will eventually be named Pikes Peak.
- November 25 – Jefferson receives Wilkinson's message that there are plans to attack Spanish territory, and he convenes his Cabinet.
- November 27 – Worrying that Burr is going to invade and annex Spanish territory, Jefferson issues a proclamation warning the American people not to participate.

=== December 1806 ===
- December 1 – The 9th United States Congress convenes for its second session.
- December 2 – Jefferson delivers the 1806 State of the Union Address in writing.
- December 9 – Burr's ships are seized at Blennerhassett Island following an order from the governor of Ohio.
- December 12 – Jefferson requests that Congress ban the slave trade.
- December 13 – Jefferson nominates his Supreme Court recess appointment Henry Brockholst Livingston.
- December 14 – John Breckinridge, the incumbent attorney general, dies.

== 1807 ==
=== January 1807 ===
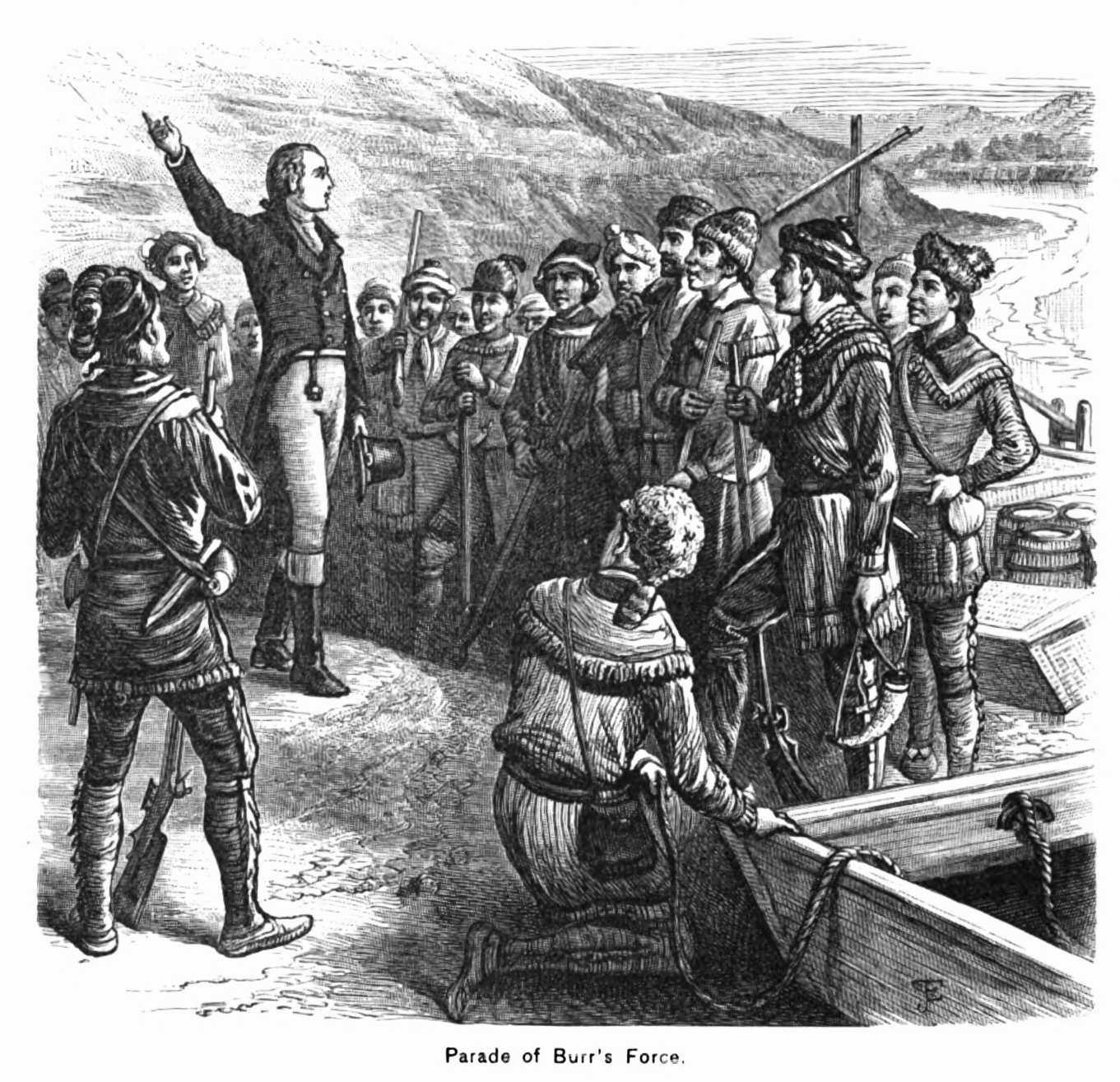
Aaron Burr was accused of building his own forces toward an insurrection.

- January 1 – Meriwhether Lewis visits Jefferson to discuss his expedition. They examine a large map drawn by William Clark by spreading it across the floor and crawling over it.
- January 16 – Henry Brockholst Livingston receives his commission to serve on the Supreme Court.
- January 17 – Burr is captured near New Orleans, but escapes.
- January 18 – Jefferson receives a message from Wilkinson. It includes what are ostensibly incriminating writings by Burr. It is never determined whether they were genuine or fraudulent.
- January 20 – Caesar Augustus Rodney becomes attorney general to fill the vacancy left by John Breckinridge.
- January 22 – Jefferson delivers a message to Congress warning of Burr's activities. He expresses his belief that Burr's "guilt is placed beyond question".

=== February 1807 ===
- February 10 – A survey of the American coasts is authorized.
- February 19 – Burr is arrested at Fort Stoddert.
- February 24 – The Seventh Circuit Act of 1807 expands the Supreme Court from six members to seven and reorganizes the federal courts in Kentucky, Ohio, and Tennessee.
- February 28 – Jefferson nominates Thomas Todd to fill the new seat on the Supreme Court.

=== March 1807 ===
- March 2 – The importation of slaves to the United States is banned, effective January 1, 1808.
- March 3
  - Jefferson appoints Meriwether Lewis as governor of Louisiana Territory. He spends the first year governing by mail.
  - The Insurrection Act of 1807 replaces the Calling Forth Act of 1792 in response to Burr's political activity. It authorizes the president to use land or naval forces at his discretion to suppress insurrection.
  - Thomas Todd receives his commission to serve on the Supreme Court.
  - The 9th United States Congress adjourns from its second session.
- March 12 – The Embargo Act of 1807 is signed into law, authorizing the transport of American goods from foreign ports.

=== April 1807 ===
- April 7 – Jefferson departs from Washington for Monticello.

=== May 1807 ===
- May 12 – American diplomat George Davis negotiates the release of Hamet Karamanli's family in Tripoli to enforce compliance with the peace treaty that ended the First Barbary War.
- May 16 – Jefferson returns to Washington from Monticello.

=== June 1807 ===
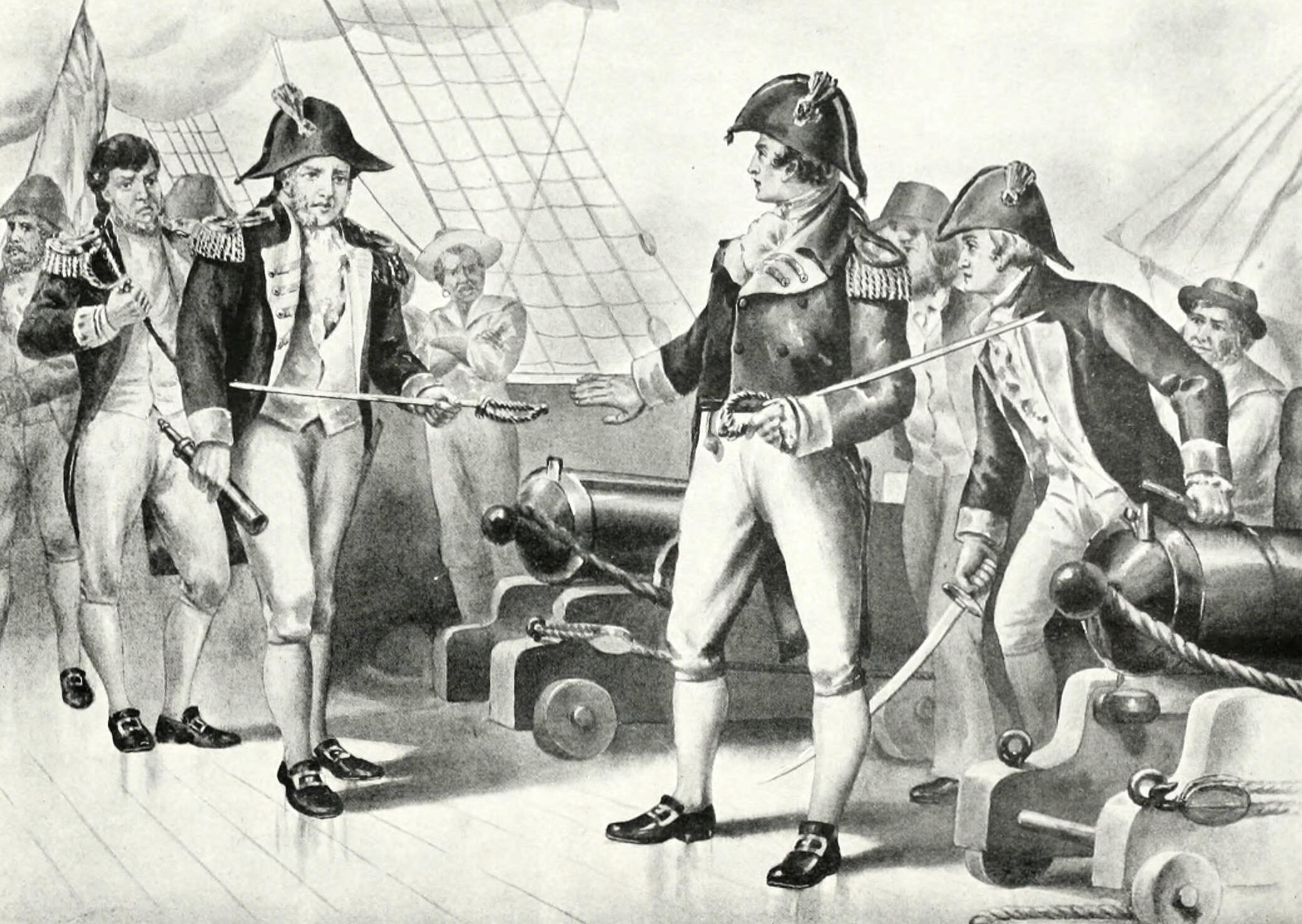
The USS Chesapeake surrendered to the HMS Leopard on June 22, 1807, in the Chesapeake–Leopard affair.

- June 15 – Jefferson is subpoenaed at Burr's request.
- June 22 – A battle takes place between the British fourth-rate HMS Leopard and the American frigate USS Chesapeake in Chesapeake Bay. The Chesapeake had refused to turn over the British deserters it carried, prompting the Leopard to open fire.
- June 24 – Burr is indicted on treason.
- June 25 – The Chesapeake's captain, Charles Gordon, arrives at the White House to inform Jefferson of the Chesapeake–Leopard affair. Jefferson calls an emergency Cabinet meeting in response.

=== July 1807 ===
- July 2 – Jefferson bans British ships from American waters and calls on the naval squadron in the Mediterranean to return.
- July 4 – Jefferson meets with his Cabinet to decide on a response to British naval activity.
- July 31 – Jefferson orders that Congress convene on October 26.

=== August 1807 ===
- August 1 – Jefferson departs from Washington for Monticello.
- August 3 – Burr's trial begins on his charge of treason. The jury selection process goes on for days, because most potential jurors already believe him to be guilty.
- August 26 – Men from the Chesapeake are court-martialed.
- August 31 – In his capacity as a circuit court judge, Supreme Justice John Marshall rejects the evidence submitted to prove Burr had committed treason.

=== September 1807 ===
- September 1 – Aaron Burr is acquitted of treason.

=== October 1807 ===
- October 3 – Jefferson returns to Washington from Monticello.
- October 7 – James Monroe ends his tenure as Minister Plenipotentiary to the United Kingdom. The position will remain vacant until the appointment of William Pinkney the following April.
- October 15 – Jefferson grants pardons to deserters who return to duty.
- October 17 – Negotiations with the United Kingdom fail as it declares it will continue in its naval hostilities against the United States.
- October 20 – Burr is remained on a misdemeanor charge in Ohio. He posts bail and goes into hiding in England.
- October 26 – The 10th United States Congress convenes for its first session.
- October 27 – Jefferson delivers the 1807 State of the Union Address in writing.

=== November 1807 ===
- November 3 – Critics of Burr protest against him in Baltimore.
- November 10 – The United States signs the Treaty of Fort Clark with the Osage.
- November 11
  - The United Kingdom issues the 1807 Orders in Council, which demand that nations trading with France also pay tribute to the United Kingdom.
  - Jefferson publicly acknowledges a secret agreement that was made at the conclusion of the First Barbary War to protect Hamet Karamanli's family. He says his administration was only later made aware that negotiator Tobias Lear had made the agreement.
- November 17 – The United States signs the Treaty of Detroit with the Chippewa, Ottawa, Potawatomi, and Wyandot peoples.
- November 26 – The United States signs the Treaty of Brownstown with the Chippewa, Ottawa, Potawatomi, Shawnee, and Wyandot peoples.

=== December 1807 ===
- December – Jefferson develops a painful dental infection later in the month that causes facial swelling and fever.
- December 10 – Jefferson announces he will not seek a third term as president.
- December 18 – The Non-importation Act takes effect.
- December 17 – France issues the Milan Decree, which demands that nations stop trading with the United Kingdom and threatens to confiscate any ship that pays it tribute.
- December 18
  - Jefferson asks Congress for an embargo on foreign trade.
  - Congress approves 188 gunboats.
- December 22 – The Embargo Act of 1807 is passed as a response to British and French trade policies, banning Americans from engaging in any foreign trade. It proves unpopular among the American people.
- December 31 – Congressman John Randolph calls for an investigation into Louisiana Territory governor James Wilkinson.

== 1808 ==
=== January 1808 ===
- January 1 – The importation of slaves is banned in the United States.
- January 2 – An investigation is opened into Louisiana Territory governor James Wilkinson.
- January 9 – The Second Embargo Act expands the restrictions on foreign trade.
- January 23 – The Democratic-Republican Party selects secretary of state James Madison as its presidential nominee and incumbent vice president George Clinton as its vice presidential nominee.

=== March 1808 ===
- March 12 – The Third Embargo Act is passed, banning all exportation of goods and raising associated penalties.

=== April 1808 ===
- April 3 – Jefferson comes down with a headache that lasts for ten days.
- April 17 – France issues the Bayonne Decree, authorizing the seizure of American ships docking in Europe.
- April 19 – Jefferson issues a proclamation ordering the end of insurrection in the area around Lake Champlain, which had erupted in protest of the Embargo Act.
- April 22 – Jefferson is authorized to suspend the embargo.
- April 25
  - The Enforcement Act of 1808 places restrictions on ships' travel and authorizes searches to ensure no foreign trade takes place. Jefferson becomes more closely involved with the embargo than he intended when it requires presidential approval for travel to foreign ports.
  - The 10th United States Congress adjourns from its first session.
- April 27 – Jefferson appoints William Pinkney as the Minister Plenipotentiary of the United Kingdom to fill the vacancy left by James Monroe.

=== May 1808 ===
- May 6 – Jefferson departs from Washington for Monticello.

=== June 1808 ===
- June 10 – Jefferson returns to Washington from Monticello.
- June 28 – Louisiana Territory governor James Wilkinson is exonerated.

=== July 1808 ===
- July 20 – Jefferson departs from Washington for Monticello.

=== September 1808 ===
- September 17 – Jefferson's granddaughter Anne Cary Randolph marries Charles Lewis Bankhead.

=== October 1808 ===
- October 22 – Jefferson returns to Washington from Monticello. He brings his grandson Thomas Jefferson Randolph on the child's way to attend school in Philadelphia.

=== November 1808 ===
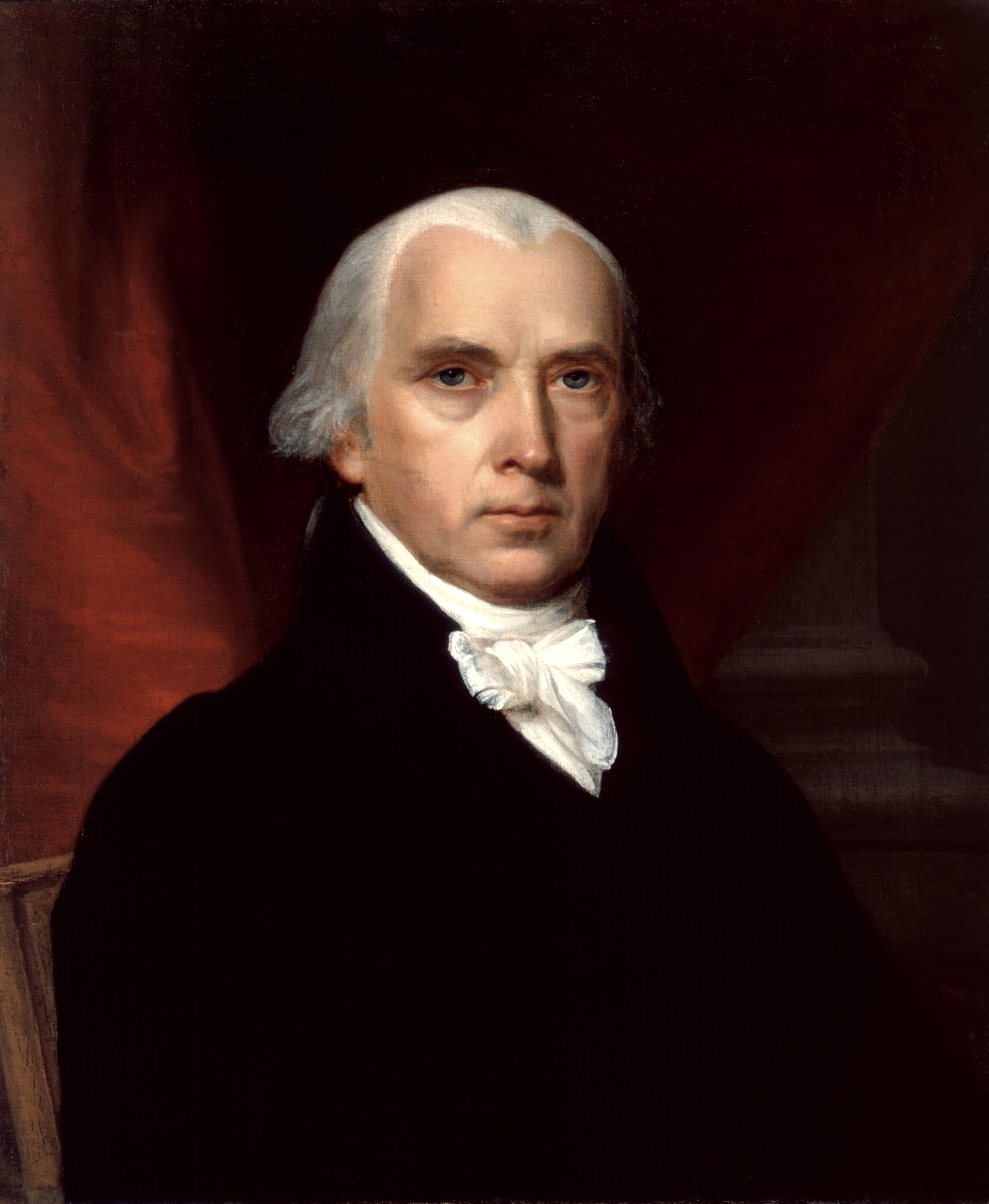
James Madison was elected president in 1808 to succeed Jefferson.

- November 7 – The 10th United States Congress convenes for its second session.
- November 8
  - The 1808 United States elections take place.
  - Jefferson delivers the 1808 State of the Union Address in writing.
- November 18 – Jefferson's jaw becomes diseased and he spends the following six weeks recovering.

=== December 1808 ===
- December 7 – James Madison wins the 1808 presidential election. George Clinton is elected vice president.
- December 30 – Jefferson convenes a special session of the Senate.

== 1809 ==
=== January 1809 ===
- January – Protests over the embargo break out in New England over the following two months.
- January 9 – The Enforcement Act of 1809 expands federal power to investigate violations of the embargo on foreign trade and allows the president to enforce it through military action.

=== February 1809 ===
- February 3 – The Illinois Territory is authorized, effective March 1. It is created from the land of the Indiana Territory, and Kaskaskia is named its capital.
- February 8 – Congress reads the electoral votes for the 1808 presidential election.
- February 17 – John Kilby Smith becomes acting secretary of war to fill the vacancy left by Henry Dearborn.
- February 27 – The Senate rejects the nomination of William Short as minister to Russia.

=== March 1809 ===
- March
  - The Illinois Territory is organized.
  - The Embargo Act is replaced by the Non-Intercourse Act, which only bans trade with France and the United Kingdom. The total ban on foreign trade had caused harm to the economy of the United States.
- March 3 – The 10th United States Congress adjourns from its second session.
- March 4 – Jefferson's presidency ends and Madison is inaugurated as the fourth president of the United States.

== See also ==
- Timeline of the Lewis and Clark Expedition

== Works cited ==
- Bevans, Charles I. (1968). Treaties and Other International Agreements of the United States of America, 1776-1949. United States Department of State.
- Boles, John B. (2017). Jefferson: Architect of American Liberty. Basic Books. ISBN 978-0-465-09468-4.
- Hall, Kermit L.; Ely, James W., eds. (2009). The Oxford Guide to United States Supreme Court Decisions (2nd ed.). Oxford University Press.
- Malone, Dumas (1970). Jefferson and His Time. Vol. IV. Little, Brown and Company. LCCN 48-5972.
- Malone, Dumas (1974). Jefferson and His Time. Vol. V. Little, Brown and Company. LCCN 48-5972.
- McMullin, Thomas; Walker, David A. (1984). Biographical Directory of American Territorial Governors. Bloomsbury Academic. ISBN 978-0-313-28101-3.
- Meacham, Jon (2012). Thomas Jefferson: The Art of Power. Random House. ISBN 978-1-4000-6766-4.
- Peterson, Merrill D. (1970). Thomas Jefferson and the New Nation. Oxford University Press. LCCN 70-110394.
- Stathis, Stephen W. (2014). Landmark Legislation 1774–2012: Major U.S. Acts and Treaties (2nd ed.). CQ Press. ISBN 978-1-4522-9230-4.
- Van Zandt, Franklin K. (1976). Boundaries of the United States and the Several States: With Miscellaneous Geographic Information Concerning Areas, Altitudes, and Geographic Centers. U.S. Government Printing Office.
- Wheelan, Joseph (2003). Jefferson's War: America's First War on Terror, 1801–1805. Carroll & Graf. ISBN 978-0-7867-1404-9.
