= Action of 17 June 1802 =

1802 naval battle of the First Barbary War

- Part of First Barbary War
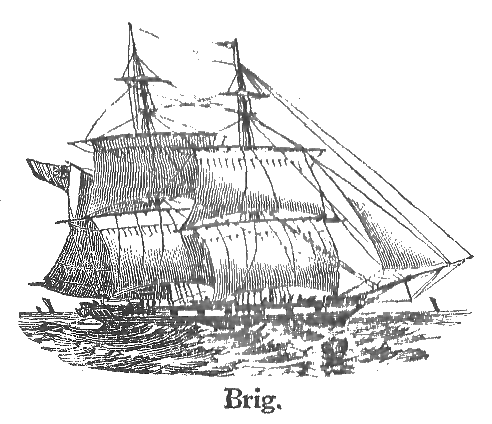
- Brig ship
Date	17 June 1802
Location	Cape Palos
Result	Tripolitanian victory

Belligerents
United States	Tripolitania

Commanders and leaders
Cpt. Andrew Morris (POW)	Unknown

Strength
Brig Franklin	3 ships 110 men

Casualties and losses
Franklin captured 9 captured	None

The Action of 17 June 1802 was a minor naval engagement during the first Barbary War between the United States Navy and Tripolitan Navy. The Tripolitans managed to capture USS Franklin.

== Background ==
After the Tripolitan defeat on August 1, 1801, the US Navy began escorting American merchant ships for the remainder of the year. The US Congress decided to replace the captain, Richard Dale, with Richard Valentine Morris. Unfortunately for the Americans, Morris was an ineffective and unaggressive captain. He blockaded Tripoli without effect. Many American merchant ships began disregarding the idea of sailing in convoy, despite many warnings from US commanders. The Tripolitans healed after their defeat in 1801, and in 1802, the Pasha of Tripoli, Yusuf Karamanli, ordered Tripolitan ships to cruise and capture any US merchant ships.

== Action ==
On June 17, 1802, three Tripolitan ships sailed in convoy looking for any US ships to capture. The ships had 4 guns and a total crew of 110 men. Arriving at Cape Palos in the night, one of the Tripolitan ships noticed an American ship, USS Franklin, off the coast of Spain. The Franklin was led by Captain Andrew Morris, who had 8 men with him. The Tripolitan ship quickly sailed, boarded, and captured the ship and took it to Algiers on the 26th. Another American merchant ship was traveling with USS Franklin and managed to escape from the corsairs.

== Aftermath ==
The Tripolitans departed Algiers and sailed for Bizerte, where the Franklin was left there. Sailing for Tripoli, the British consul in Tripoli managed to free 3 of the crew, as he claimed they were British subjects. Two others were freed, so only Morris and 3 others were left as American prisoners. The consul, William Eaton, attempted to negotiate with Karamanli on freeing the prisoners, but to no avail. It was only after the intervention of the Dey of Algiers that he managed to free the prisoners. The Americans were forced to pay a $6,500 ransom. Morris and his crew would finally leave in October. The Americans, however, would never be able to reclaim the Franklin. The Tripolitans had left it in Tunis, and the ship was sold alongside its cargo.

== Sources ==
- Gary Edward Wilson (1984), American Prisoners in the Barbary Nations, 1784-1816.
- Gardner Weld Allen (1905), Our Navy and the Barbary Corsairs.
- William Armstrong Fairburn (1945), Merchant Sail, Vol I.
