= John Adams' State of the Union Address =

United States President John Adams gave two State of the Union speeches:

- John Adams' First State of the Union Address
- John Adams' Second State of the Union Address
