= 1800 State of the Union Address =

Speech by US President John Adams

- Date: November 11, 1800
- Venue: Hall of the House of Representatives, Congress Hall
- Location: Philadelphia, Pennsylvania
- Type: State of the Union Address
- Participants: John Adams; Thomas Jefferson; Theodore Sedgwick
- Previous: 1799 State of the Union Address
- Next: 1801 State of the Union Address

The 1800 State of the Union Address was given by John Adams, the second president of the United States, on Tuesday, November 11, 1800, to a joint session of the 6th United States Congress. It was the first State of the Union Address delivered at the new United States Capitol in Washington, D.C.

Delivered in the Senate chamber, Adams began his speech by congratulating members on their new seat of government and—pointedly—"on the prospect of a residence not to be changed." He added, optimistically, "Although there is some cause to apprehend that accommodations are not now so complete as might be wished, yet there is great reason to believe that this inconvenience will cease with the present session." This would be the last annual message any president would personally deliver to Congress for the next 113 years.

This would be the last State of the Union address delivered as a speech until Woodrow Wilson deliver the 1913 State of the Union Address, as President Thomas Jefferson delivered the 1801 State of the Union Address as a written message because he felt a speech to Congress was too monarchical.

Preceded by 1799 State of the Union Address	State of the Union addresses 1800	Succeeded by 1801 State of the Union Address
