= 1799 State of the Union Address =

Speech by US President John Adams

- Date: December 3, 1799
- Venue: Hall of the House of Representatives, Congress Hall
- Location: Philadelphia, Pennsylvania
- Type: State of the Union Address
- Participants: John Adams; Thomas Jefferson; Theodore Sedgwick
- Previous: 1798 State of the Union Address
- Next: 1800 State of the Union Address

The 1799 State of the Union Address was given to the United States Congress, on Tuesday, December 3, 1799, by the second president of the United States, John Adams. He said, "the return of health, industry, and trade to those cities which have lately been afflicted with disease, and the various and inestimable advantages, civil and religious, which, secured under our happy frame of government, are continued to us unimpaired, demand of the whole American people sincere thanks to a benevolent Deity for the merciful dispensations of His providence." It was the last address to be given at Congress Hall, Philadelphia.

The president noted that it was a time of great change in the world, and that nothing short of "the power of repelling aggressions will secure to our country a rational prospect of escaping the calamities of war or national degradation."

Preceded by 1798 State of the Union Address	State of the Union addresses 1799	Succeeded by 1800 State of the Union Address
