= 1808 State of the Union Address =

Speech by US President Thomas Jefferson

- Date: November 8, 1808
- Venue: House Chamber, United States Capitol
- Location: Washington, D.C.; 38°53′23″N 77°00′32″W
- Type: State of the Union Address
- Participants: Thomas Jefferson; George Clinton; Joseph Bradley Varnum
- Format: Written
- Previous: 1807 State of the Union Address
- Next: 1809 State of the Union Address

The 1808 State of the Union Address was delivered by the third president of the United States, Thomas Jefferson, on November 8, 1808. This was Jefferson's final address to the 10th United States Congress.

In the speech, Jefferson focused heavily on the Embargo Act of 1807, which had been enacted in response to British and French aggressions toward U.S. neutral trading rights during the Napoleonic Wars. Jefferson expressed disappointment that neither Britain nor France had responded favorably to U.S. diplomatic efforts to resolve the situation and revoke their respective decrees and orders that disrupted American commerce.

Jefferson acknowledged the hardships caused by the embargo but defended its necessity as a peaceful alternative to war. He explained that the embargo had preserved U.S. merchant ships and sailors from further attacks and allowed time for defense preparations. Jefferson called on Congress to determine the future course of action, weighing the painful alternatives of maintaining the embargo or considering other measures.

In terms of foreign relations, Jefferson reported continued friction with Great Britain over the unresolved Chesapeake–Leopard affair, as well as challenges in diplomatic negotiations with France and Spain. He also noted peaceful relations with the Barbary States and friendly engagement with Native American tribes, praising efforts to integrate agriculture and industry among southern tribes.

Jefferson reflected on the nation's fiscal health, announcing a surplus in the federal treasury and significant reductions in the national debt. He proposed that future surpluses could be used for public improvements, such as roads, canals, and education, or Congress could consider constitutional amendments to allow for more extensive infrastructure projects.

Concluding his address, Jefferson expressed gratitude for the trust and support of Congress and the American people throughout his presidency. He conveyed his hope that the nation's dedication to liberty and law would ensure its continued prosperity and happiness.

Preceded by 1807 State of the Union Address	State of the Union addresses 1808	Succeeded by 1809 State of the Union Address
