= 1797 State of the Union Address =

Speech by US President John Adams

- Date: November 22, 1797
- Venue: Hall of the House of Representatives, Congress Hall
- Location: Philadelphia, Pennsylvania
- Type: State of the Union Address
- Participants: John Adams; Thomas Jefferson; Jonathan Dayton
- Previous: 1796 State of the Union Address
- Next: 1798 State of the Union Address

The 1797 State of the Union Address was delivered by John Adams, second president of the United States, on Wednesday, November 22, 1797, in the Congress Hall of Philadelphia, Pennsylvania. At the time of the address, sickness was spreading through Philadelphia and Adams notes in his introduction that he was tempted to relocate the assembly of the national legislature but avoided this due to inevitable expense and general inconvenience.

== French aggression ==
Adams began his State of the Union Address by expressing concern over European, most notably French, aggression towards American merchant vessels. He emphasizes the importance of America's growing role in international commerce, citing accomplishments in agriculture and commercial fishing. In July and August 1797 delegates traveled to the Batavian Republic and then to France. They arrived in Paris on September 19 and began negotiations in the hope of pacifying Franco-American relations. At the time the speech was delivered, the status of the meetings in France were unknown, but Adams knew and stated in the speech that war, with France or possibly other European countries, for example Great Britain, was becoming an increasingly likely turn of events. The Federalist Party advocated going to war, but Adams ignored Francophobia and avoided going to war with France until 1798 in the Quasi-War. The U.S. later went to war with Britain in the War of 1812, partly due to Jefferson's refusal to pay tribute to a foreign nation.

== Colonial competition and intimidation of the U.S. ==
Piracy of American ships in international waters by the French was a microcosm of French and British colonial competition; specifically, French aggression was a reaction to the Jay Treaty, which they perceived was an Anglo-American alliance, and the belief that tribute could be collected from the infantile republic by exerting sufficient military pressure.

Adams' assertion that "respect to treaties has been so diminished" is a reference to the violation of the Treaty of Alliance by the French through piracy and the violation of Pinckney's Treaty by the Spanish through illegal garrisons in the western U.S. frontiers.

The Jay Treaty, Pinckney's Treaty, the Treaty of Tripoli, also negotiated by Thomas Pinckney, the Treaty with Tunis, and France's attempt at forming a similar treaty with the U.S. in March 1797, the infamous XYZ Affair, were attempts by foreign powers to extort money and power from the U.S. government while limiting the influence other world powers had on the emerging nation. Although these treaties were highly unfavorable to the U.S., the policy of appeasement carried out during the Washington and Adams administrations was necessary to provide time for the U.S. to build up its navy and militia.

Foreign intervention in domestic affairs of the U.S. was not limited to abuses in the water. Adams condemned ventures by foreign agents, such as those of Spain, who tried to incite an insurgency among Native Americans.

Adams expresses hope that the as yet unfulfilled obligations of the Treaty of Amity and Commerce (1797), surveying the St. Croix River between Maine and New Brunswick and paying debts American citizens owed to British subjects prior to the American Revolutionary War, due to various unstated causes, and the unfulfilled obligations of the Spanish regarding compensation for American ships stolen or destroyed in recent Franco-Spanish hostilities, will continue without offending citizens of any country.

He deplores the impressing of American soldiers by French and Spanish forces and criticizes the legal framework concerning the proper reaction to such action; how to guarantee the safe return of captured seamen from foreign territories, and the inability of consuls to "demand an inspection of the registers and sea letters."

== National debt ==
Adams directly addresses the House of Representatives in regard to the national debt and taxes which had to be raised in order to fund a larger, more mobile Army. He warns against loans as he believed that they had contributed to the vast debt and economic collapse of historical empires. He ends his address by reiterating his general theme of the necessity to militarize to adequately defend against foreign imperialism.

== See also ==
- Timeline of United States diplomatic history
- Thomas Pinckney
- Charles Cotesworth Pinckney
- Piracy in the Caribbean
- Piracy and international law

Preceded by 1796 State of the Union Address	State of the Union addresses 1797	Succeeded by 1798 State of the Union Address
