= 1807 State of the Union Address =

Speech by US President Thomas Jefferson

- Date: October 27, 1807
- Venue: House Chamber, United States Capitol
- Location: Washington, D.C.; 38°53′23″N 77°00′32″W
- Type: State of the Union Address
- Participants: Thomas Jefferson; George Clinton; Joseph Bradley Varnum
- Format: Written
- Previous: 1806 State of the Union Address
- Next: 1808 State of the Union Address

The 1807 State of the Union Address was delivered by the third president of the United States, Thomas Jefferson, on October 27, 1807. This address to the 10th United States Congress was given earlier than usual due to growing tensions with Great Britain and maritime rights violations, especially the Chesapeake–Leopard affair.

Jefferson began by addressing the ongoing British violations of U.S. neutrality, particularly the June 22, 1807, attack on the USS Chesapeake by the British frigate HMS Leopard. He condemned the incident, emphasizing that it had outraged the nation and led him to issue a proclamation banning British armed vessels from American waters.

In response to the attack, Jefferson described his administration's diplomatic and defensive measures, such as requesting reparations from the British government and preparing the nation's defenses in case of escalation. He also highlighted the broader British threats to American trade, citing their policy of seizing neutral ships trading with France or Spain, which severely disrupted U.S. commerce.

Regarding domestic concerns, Jefferson reported on the ongoing treason trials related to Aaron Burr's conspiracy. He reassured Congress that the conspiracy had been thwarted by militia action and legal proceedings, although he called for a reevaluation of the laws to prevent future attempts.

Jefferson concluded by noting the nation’s fiscal health, detailing a $25.5 million reduction in the national debt since the start of his administration. The surplus, he suggested, could be directed toward defense and infrastructure projects.

Preceded by 1806 State of the Union Address	State of the Union addresses 1807	Succeeded by 1808 State of the Union Address
