= Gardner Weld Allen =

American classicist

- Born: 1856
- Died: 1944 (aged 87–88)
- Occupations: Naval historian, author
- Scientific career
- Fields: History of the United States Navy

Gardner Weld Allen (1856–1944) was an American historian and author who specialized in the history of the United States Navy.

== Biography ==
He was born in Bangor, Maine on January 19, 1856. He was the son of Joseph H. Allen and Anna Minot (Weld) Allen. He died on July 12, 1944, in Brookline, Massachusetts.

== Education ==
He graduated from Harvard College in 1877. He completed his M.D. degree at the Harvard Medical School. After brief stints of interneships completed at Boston and Providence, he moved to Germany for further higher studies.

== Career ==
He began practicing medicine in Boston in October 1884. He was professor at Tufts Medical School from 1897 to 1906, then served as surgeon five months aboard the USS Prairie during the Spanish–American War.

He served as a member of the American Antiquarian Society from April 1923 until 1925.

== Bibliography ==
He is the author of a number of notable books:

- Our Navy and the Barbary Corsairs. 1905.
- Our Naval War with France. 1909.
- A Naval History of the American Revolution. 1913.
- Naval Songs and Ballads (PDF). 1923.
- Massachusetts Privateers of the Revolution. 1927.
- Our Navy and the West Indian Pirates. 1929.

== See also ==
- First Barbary War
- United States Navy
