= 1801 State of the Union Address =

Speech by US President Thomas Jefferson

- Date: December 8, 1801
- Venue: Senate Chamber, United States Capitol
- Location: Washington, D.C.; 38°53′23″N 77°00′32″W
- Type: State of the Union Address
- Participants: Thomas Jefferson; Aaron Burr; Nathaniel Macon
- Format: Written
- Previous: 1800 State of the Union Address
- Next: 1802 State of the Union Address

The 1801 State of the Union Address was written by Thomas Jefferson, the third president of the United States, on December 8, 1801. It was his first annual address and presented in Washington, D.C. He did not speak it to the 7th United States Congress because he thought that would make him seem like a king. A clerk instead read (in part): "Whilst we devoutly return thanks to the beneficent Being who has been pleased to breathe into them the spirit of conciliation and forgiveness, we are bound with peculiar gratitude to be thankful to Him that our own peace has been preserved through so perilous a season, and ourselves permitted quietly to cultivate the earth and to practice and improve those arts which tend to increase our comforts."

Notably, the President commented on the hostilities that existed with the Barbary States, in which Barbary Pirates were attacking US commerce ships. To respond to these threats the President said, "I sent a small squadron of frigates into the Mediterranean, with assurance to that power of our sincere desire to remain in peace, but with orders to protect our commerce against the threatened attack."

Preceded by 1800 State of the Union Address	State of the Union addresses 1801	Succeeded by 1802 State of the Union Address
