= 1806 State of the Union Address =

Speech by US President Thomas Jefferson

- Date: December 2, 1806
- Venue: House Chamber, United States Capitol
- Location: Washington, D.C.; 38°53′23″N 77°00′32″W
- Type: State of the Union Address
- Participants: Thomas Jefferson; George Clinton; Nathaniel Macon
- Format: Written
- Previous: 1805 State of the Union Address
- Next: 1807 State of the Union Address

The 1806 State of the Union address was delivered by the third president of the United States Thomas Jefferson to the 9th United States Congress on December 2, 1806. In this address, Jefferson discussed several major themes including foreign relations, national defense, and the growing tensions with Great Britain and France regarding maritime rights.

One of the central focuses of the 1806 address was the ongoing conflict between Britain and France, which continued to affect American shipping and trade. Jefferson expressed concern over the violation of U.S. neutrality, noting that American vessels had been seized and their crews impressed into service by foreign navies. Jefferson called for stronger defense measures, stating, "But such is the situation of the nations of Europe and such, too, the predicament is which we stand with some of them that we can not rely with certainty on the present aspect of our affairs."

Jefferson also emphasized the importance of the nation's economy and fiscal responsibility. He praised Congress for reducing the national debt while maintaining essential government services, and he advocated for continuing efforts to pay off public debt as a means to ensure long-term prosperity.

Additionally, Jefferson discussed relations with Native American tribes, the administration of the newly acquired Louisiana Territory, and the expansion of infrastructure, including the construction of roads and canals to support westward expansion.

Preceded by 1805 State of the Union Address	State of the Union addresses 1806	Succeeded by 1807 State of the Union Address
