= 1803 State of the Union Address =

Speech by US President Thomas Jefferson

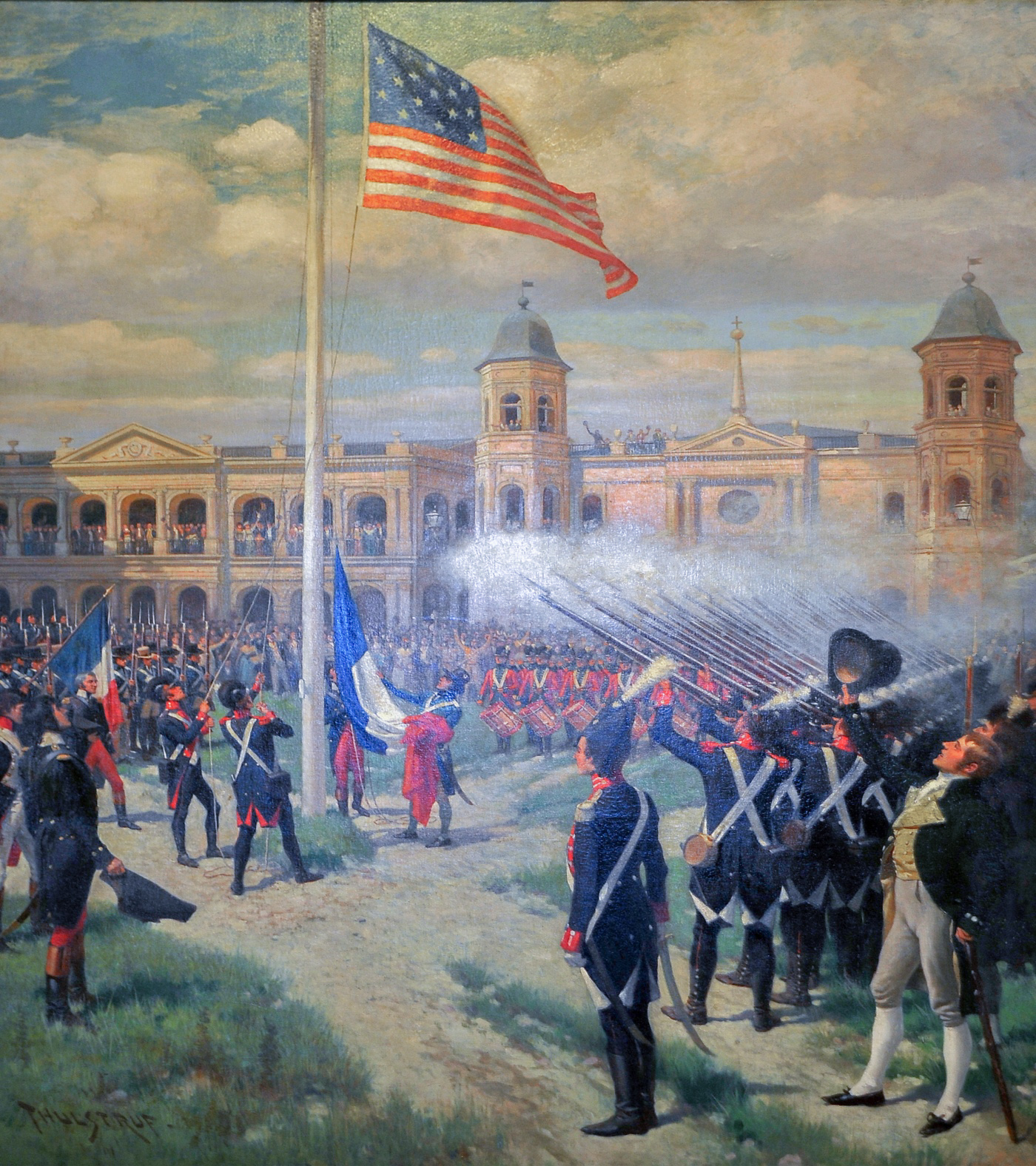
- handover ceremony of Louisiana from France to the US, painting, Louisiana State Museum, New Orleans, LA
- Date: October 17, 1803
- Venue: Senate Chamber, United States Capitol
- Location: Washington, D.C.; 38°53′23″N 77°00′32″W
- Type: State of the Union Address
- Participants: Thomas Jefferson; Aaron Burr; Nathaniel Macon
- Format: Written
- Previous: 1802 State of the Union Address
- Next: 1804 State of the Union Address

The 1803 State of the Union address was delivered by the third president of the United States Thomas Jefferson to the 8th United States Congress on October 17, 1803. This speech centered around the Louisiana Purchase and the expansion of the United States, along with efforts to maintain peace with Native American tribes and establish neutral foreign relations amidst ongoing European conflicts.

Jefferson highlighted the success of the Louisiana Purchase, stating that it secured "an independent outlet for the produce of the Western States" and ensured "important aids to our Treasury, an ample provision for our posterity, and a wide spread for the blessings of freedom." This acquisition, he noted, would help guarantee peace by removing foreign control over such a crucial part of the continent.

In addition, Jefferson discussed efforts to maintain peaceful relations with Native American tribes. He pointed to the policy of establishing trading houses to supply Native communities with necessary goods, a move aimed at fostering "peace and good will."

On foreign affairs, Jefferson reiterated the importance of neutrality as wars raged in Europe, expressing his desire to "cultivate the friendship of the belligerent nations by every act of justice and of innocent kindness." He underscored the importance of avoiding entanglements in foreign conflicts while ensuring that American commerce and sovereignty were respected.

| Preceded by 1802 State of the Union Address | State of the Union addresses 1803 | Succeeded by 1804 State of the Union Address |
