= 1802 State of the Union Address =

Speech by US President Thomas Jefferson

1803 State of the Union Address
- Date: December 15, 1802
- Venue: Senate Chamber, United States Capitol
- Location: Washington, D.C.; 38°53′23″N 77°00′32″W
- Type: State of the Union Address
- Participants: Thomas Jefferson; Aaron Burr; Nathaniel Macon
- Format: Written
- Previous: 1801 State of the Union Address
- Next: 1803 State of the Union Address

The 1802 State of the Union Address was written by Thomas Jefferson, the third president of the United States, on Wednesday, December 15, 1802. He said, "When we assemble together, fellow citizens, to consider the state of our beloved country, our just attentions are first drawn to those pleasing circumstances which mark the goodness of that Being from whose favor they flow and the large measure of thankfulness we owe for His bounty. Another year has come around, and finds us still blessed with peace and friendship abroad; law, order, and religion at home; good affection and harmony with our Indian neighbors; our burthens lightened, yet our income sufficient for the public wants, and the produce of the year great beyond example."

The president notably reported on the First Barbary War and provided a brief statement on a particular occurrence of the loss of an American vessel saying, "..one of these an American vessel unfortunately fell a prey. The Captain, one American seaman, and two others of colour, remain prisoners with them; unless exchanged under an agreement formerly made with the Bashaw, to whom, on the faith of that, some of his captive subjects had been restored."

Preceded by 1801 State of the Union Address	State of the Union addresses 1802	Succeeded by 1803 State of the Union Address
