= 1804 State of the Union Address =

Speech by US President Thomas Jefferson

- Date: November 8, 1804
- Venue: Senate Chamber, United States Capitol
- Location: Washington, D.C.; 38°53′23″N 77°00′32″W
- Type: State of the Union Address
- Participants: Thomas Jefferson; Aaron Burr; Nathaniel Macon
- Format: Written
- Previous: 1803 State of the Union Address
- Next: 1805 State of the Union Address

The 1804 State of the Union address was delivered by the third president of the United States Thomas Jefferson to the 8th United States Congress on November 8, 1804. In his address, Jefferson focused on matters of foreign relations, domestic governance, and the ongoing expansion of the United States following the Louisiana Purchase.

== Themes ==
A major topic in the 1804 address was the ongoing conflict in Europe and its effect on American commerce. Jefferson noted that while European wars were ongoing, "the flames...have not yet extended" to the United States. He also mentioned irregularities in American maritime activity and issues surrounding the enforcement of neutral trade laws.

In addition, Jefferson discussed the new territories acquired through the Louisiana Purchase, describing the progress in organizing government in both the Orleans and Louisiana Territories. He emphasized efforts to establish peaceful relations with Native American tribes in these regions, promoting commerce and justice as a means of maintaining peace.

Finally, Jefferson addressed fiscal matters, reporting that revenues continued to exceed expectations and enabled the repayment of significant portions of the national debt. The payment of over $3.6 million during the past year contributed to a reduction of more than $12 million in the principal debt since 1801, fulfilling the administration's goal of financial responsibility.

Preceded by 1803 State of the Union Address	State of the Union addresses 1804	Succeeded by 1805 State of the Union Address
