= 1805 State of the Union Address =

Speech by US President Thomas Jefferson

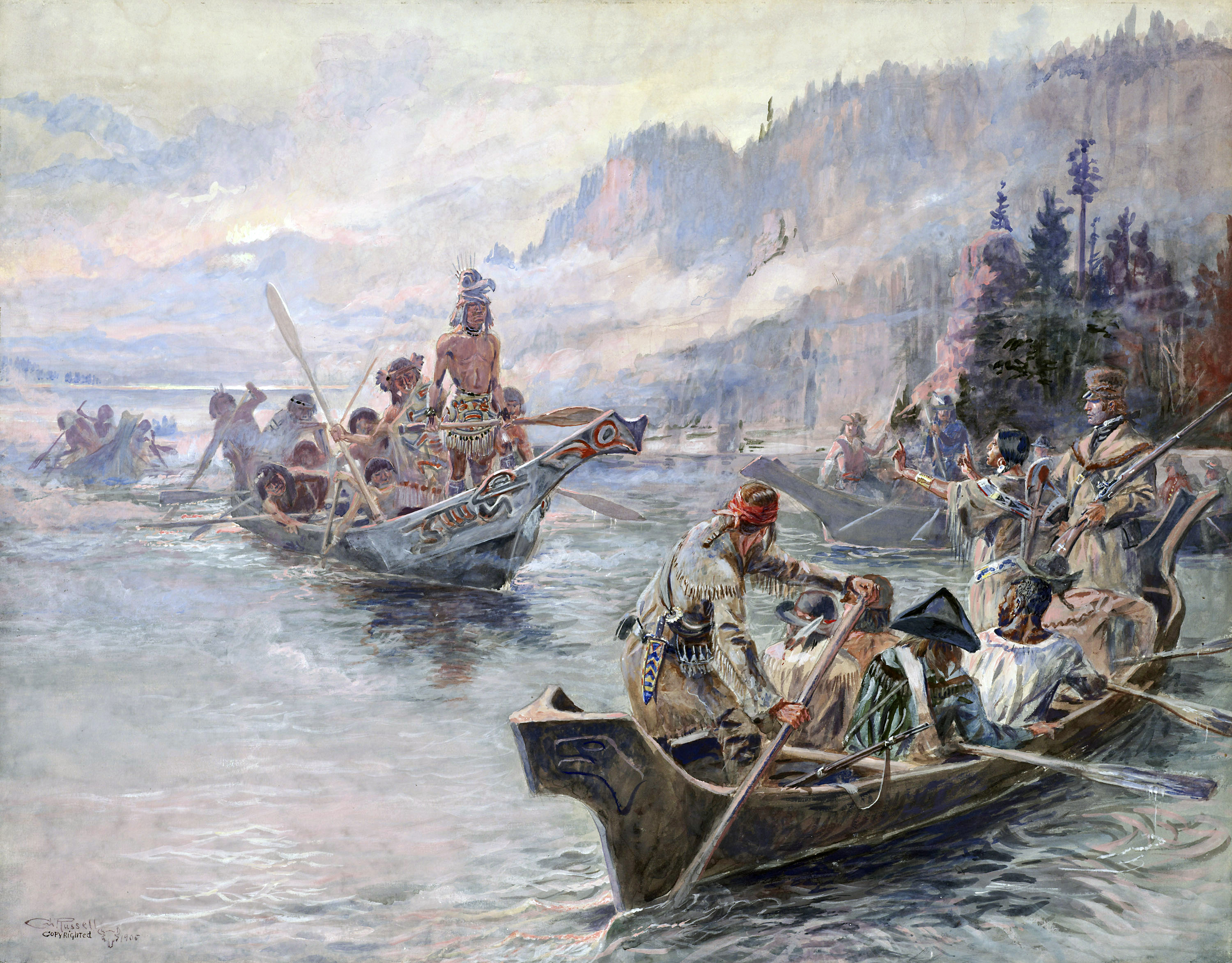
- Painting of the Lewis and Clark expedition in a canoe meeting some Native Americans. The expedition reached the Pacific coast in 1805
- Date: December 3, 1805
- Venue: Senate Chamber, United States Capitol
- Location: Washington, D.C.; 38°53′23″N 77°00′32″W
- Type: State of the Union Address
- Participants: Thomas Jefferson; George Clinton; Nathaniel Macon
- Format: Written
- Previous: 1804 State of the Union Address
- Next: 1806 State of the Union Address

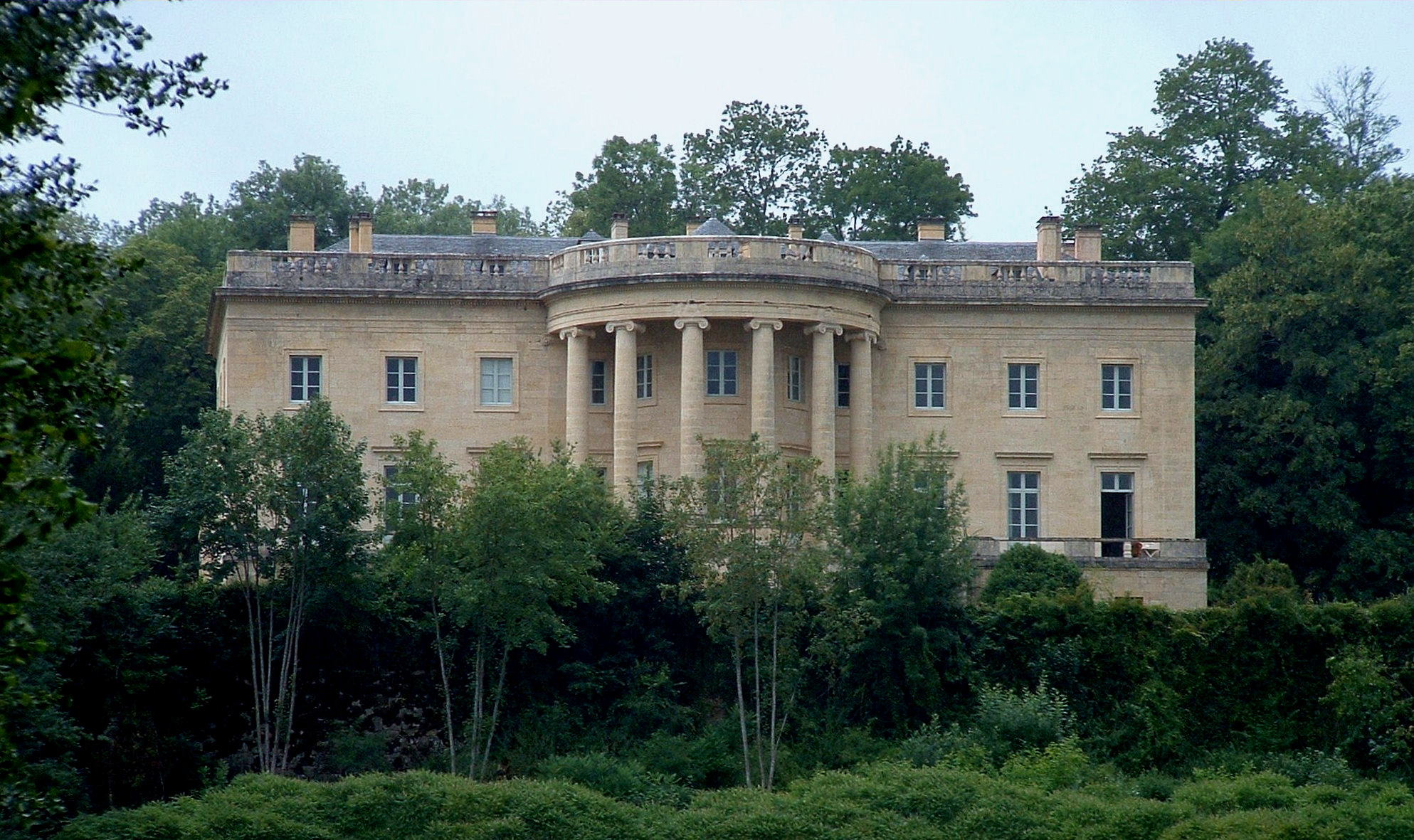

The 1805 State of the Union Address was given by the third president of the United States, Thomas Jefferson, on Tuesday, December 3, 1805. He did not give it directly to the 9th United States Congress, but only presented his written address. It was the first of his second term in the White House. He began with, "At a moment when the nations of Europe are in commotion and arming against each other, and when those with whom we have principal intercourse are engaged in the general contest, and when the countenance of some of them toward our peaceable country threatens that even that may not be unaffected by what is passing on the general theater, a meeting of the representatives of the nation in both Houses of Congress has become more than usually desirable." He ended with, "On this first occasion of addressing Congress since, by the choice of my constituents, I have entered on a second term of administration, I embrace the opportunity to give this public assurance that I will exert my best endeavors to administer faithfully the executive department, and will zealously cooperate with you in every measure which may tend to secure the liberty, property, and personal safety of our fellow citizens, and to consolidate the republican forms and principles of our Government."

Notably, the President hailed the release of American prisoners of the Barbary War and also reported on various land acquisitions from Native Americans over the past year.

Preceded by 1804 State of the Union Address	State of the Union addresses 1805	Succeeded by 1806 State of the Union Address
