= USS Franklin (1795) =

United States Navy brig

History

United States
- Name: USS Franklin
- Namesake: Benjamin Franklin
- Cost: £928,4,6 purchased
- Launched: 1795
- Acquired: 27 April 1805 at Trieste
- Fate: Sold 21 March 1807

General characteristics
- Displacement: 155 tons
- Length: 72 ft 4 in (22.05 m)
- Beam: 22 ft 4 in (6.81 m)
- Complement: 16

The second USS Franklin of the United States Navy was an 8-gun brig. She was named for Founding Father Benjamin Franklin.

Built at Philadelphia in 1795, she was captured by Tripolitan corsairs in 1802, and sold to the commercial agent of the Bey of Tunis. She was purchased on 27 April 1805 by Captain James Barron at Trieste.

In June 1805 Franklin was ordered to Syracuse, Sicily, where she was placed in charge of Lieutenant Jacob Jones to accommodate officers seized from the frigate Philadelphia, and recently released from a Tripolitan prison. On 30 July she was with the U.S. fleet at Tunis. to September she served as storeship for the Mediterranean Squadron and on the 24th departed for the United States with General William Eaton, U.S. Navy Agent to the Barbary Powers, embarked.

Following an overhaul at Washington Navy Yard she voyaged to New Orleans, Louisiana with crew and supplies for that station. Again in December 1806 she carried a company of Marines and munitions for the New Orleans station. There she was turned over to the Navy Agent for disposal and on 21 March 1807 was sold.
