= Linda Hollis =

American historian (born 1951)

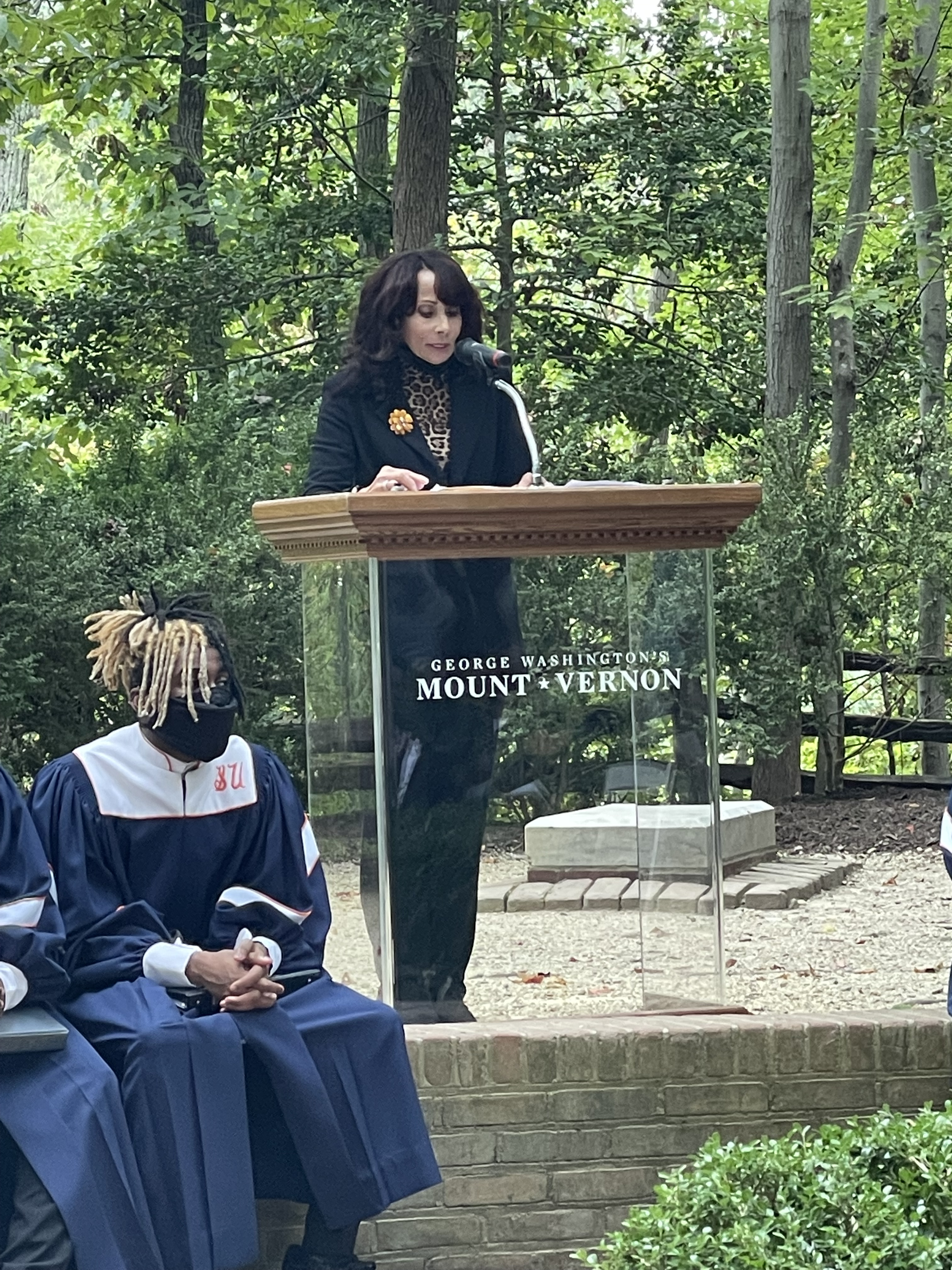
- Linda Allen Hollis speaking at slave commemoration at Mt. Vernon, 2021
- Born: Linda Allen Hollis; 1951 (age 74–75); Peoria, Illinois, United States
- Other name: Linda Allen Bryant
- Occupation: Historian
- Known for: West Ford Legacy
- Notable work: I Cannot Tell a Lie: The True Story of George Washington's African American Descendants (2004)

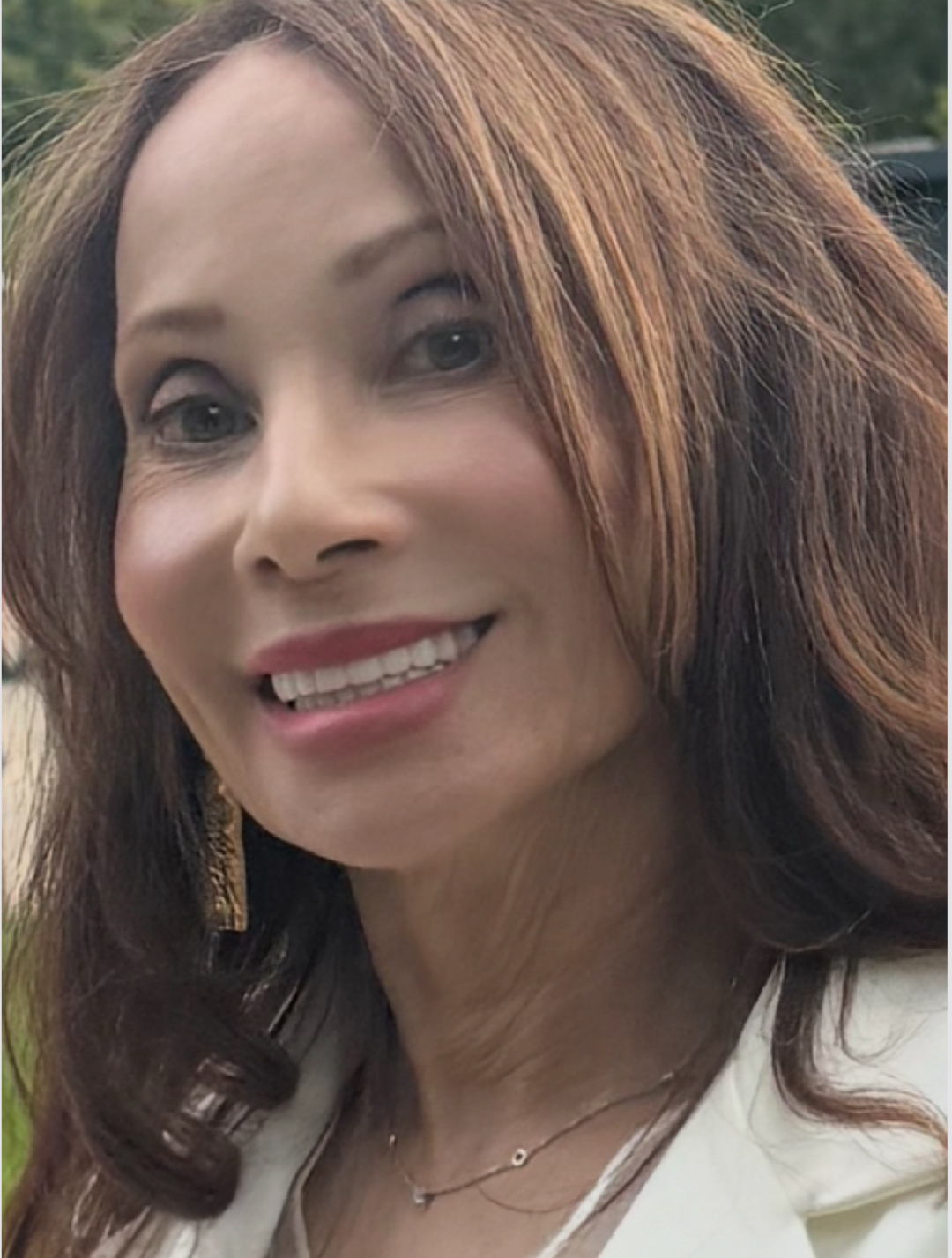
Photo of Linda Allen Hollis 2025

Linda Allen Hollis (born 1951) is an American historian, biographer, and author. She is a direct descendant of West Ford, who, in Ford's oral history, is the African-American son of George Washington. Her work focuses mainly on early American history and sharing African American histories that broaden how we see our collective past.

== Early life and education ==
Hollis was born and raised in Peoria, Illinois, in a large family of eleven children. Her mother, Elise Ford Allen, was the founder, publisher, and editor of the Traveler Weekly, and her father was an inventor with two chemical and three mechanical patents and owner of the Traveler Printing Company.

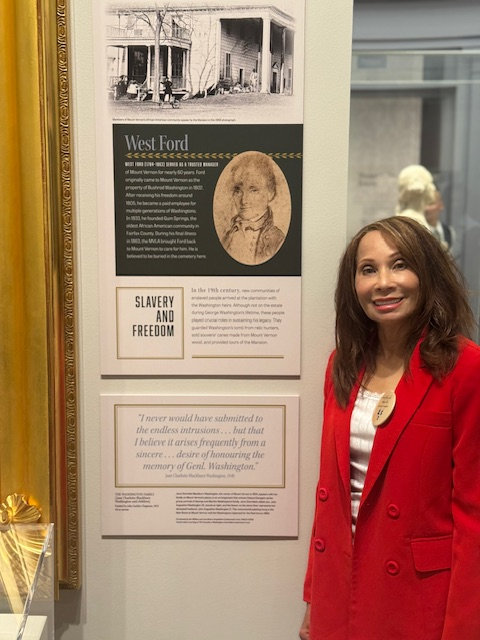
Linda Allen Hollis next to ancestor, West Ford's, plaque at Mount Vernon, June 2025.

Hollis attended Manual High School and received her undergraduate degree from Bradley University in Geology. She obtained her master's degree from the University of Colorado Boulder in the same discipline.

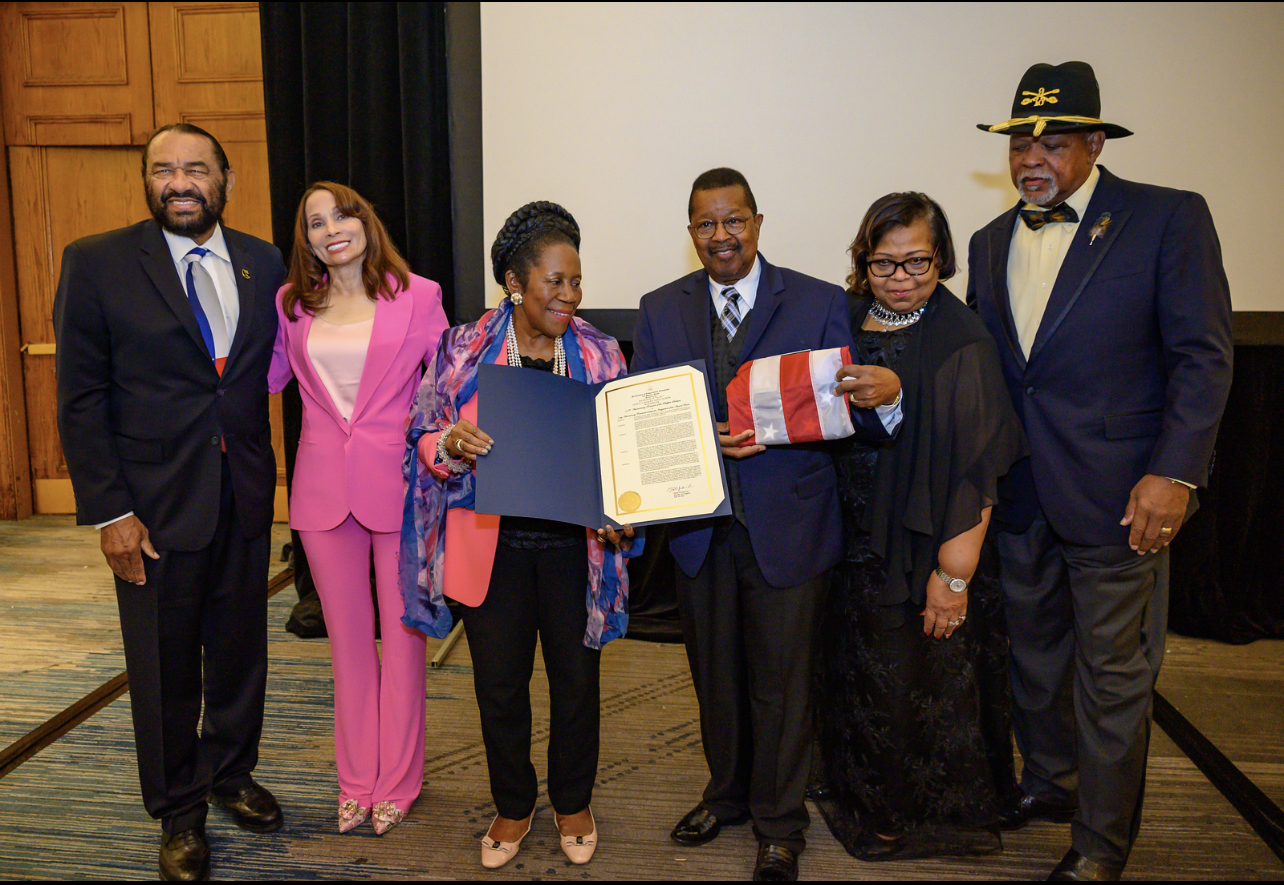
Linda Allen Hollis at the 157th Anniversy Reunion of the 9th and 10th Horse Cavalry Association, 2023

== Career ==
Hollis began her career with the Anaconda Mineral Company and later worked for several pharmaceutical firms. Over the years, she has become a national speaker on genealogy and the author of multiple books, including one on American history that focuses on West Ford.

Hollis' work focuses mainly on early American history and racial reconciliation. Over three decades, she has meticulously researched her lineage and the extended Ford family, becoming a recognized expert in early American history and genealogy. Her work is particularly associated with George Washington and his relationship with slavery. She written a memoir, I Cannot Tell a Lie: The True Story of George Washington's African American Descendants. She also writes as Linda Allen Bryant and L.A. Hollis.

As president of the West Ford Legacy Foundation, Hollis organizes descendant reunions, public speaking, and preservation initiatives focused on Gum Springs, Virginia; the community founded by West Ford in 1833 and the oldest African American settlement in Fairfax County, Virginia. She currently is involved in DNA studies and a museum traveling exhibit - Major George W. Ford, Buffalo Soldier.ref name="blackpast" />

== Personal life ==
Hollis is married to husband, Emerson Mark Hollis, an educator. The couple has six children together.

== Publications ==
As Linda Allen Bryant

- I Cannot Tell a Lie: The True Story of George Washington's African American Descendants (2004)
  - One newspaper article discusses this book

As L.A. Hollis

- Going in Circles (2011)
- Blood Virus: A Pandemic by Design (2016)

== See also ==
- West Ford
- George W. Ford (Buffalo Soldier)
