= West Ford =

(1784–1863) Manager of Mount Vernon, founder of Gum Springs

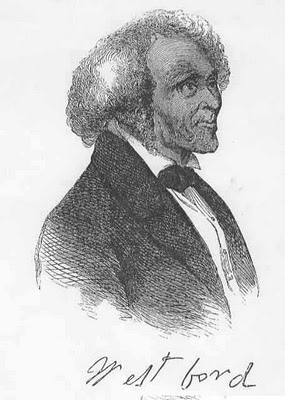
Portrait of West Ford in 1859, by Benson John Lossing

West Ford (c. 1784 – 1863) was the caretaker and manager of Mount Vernon, which had been the home of George Washington. Ford also founded Gum Springs, Virginia near Mount Vernon.

Ford was born on the Bushfield Plantation in Westmoreland County, Virginia, the son of a woman named Venus, who was classified as "mulatto" in the parlance of the time. Venus was held in bondage as a house slave by Washington's brother John Augustine Washington, and by John's wife Hannah. The Ford family claims (based on oral tradition) that West Ford’s father was George Washington; however, historians and experts argue there is no evidence for this claim. There also exists conflicting oral history, and circumstantial evidence, that suggests that George Washington's nephew, Bushrod Washington, is more likely the father of West Ford. Similarly, there is no conclusive evidence for this claim either.

In 1802, Ford moved to Mount Vernon, where Washington had died in 1799. Ford became a free man about 1805. In 1833, he established the settlement of Gum Springs, which was the first African American settlement in Fairfax County, Virginia. He continued to work at nearby Mount Vernon until 1860, and returned to Mount Vernon when the Mount Vernon Ladies' Association brought him to the estate to care for him during his final illness and death, while the American Civil War was raging.

== Early life ==
West Ford's exact birth date is unknown but Mary V. Thompson, Mount Vernon Research Historian, writes that the year was "about 1784". West Ford's age has been recorded several times all with different dates in the range of 1784 to 1787.

When John Augustine Washington died in 1787, he left Venus and her parents, Jenny and Billey, to his wife, Hannah. There was no mention of West in his will. In Hannah's will, written in 1802, she specified:

[I]t is my most earnest wish and desire this lad West may be as soon as possible inoculated for the small pox, after which to be bound to a good tradesman until the age of 21 years, after which he is to be free the rest of his life.

Major George W. Ford, a grandson of West Ford, stated in a 1937 article that his grandfather was a personal attendant of George Washington as a small boy and that Washington took him to church and on wagon rides. West was taught to read, write and do arithmetic, which was against the law for slaves in Virginia. He was also taught the trade of carpentry.

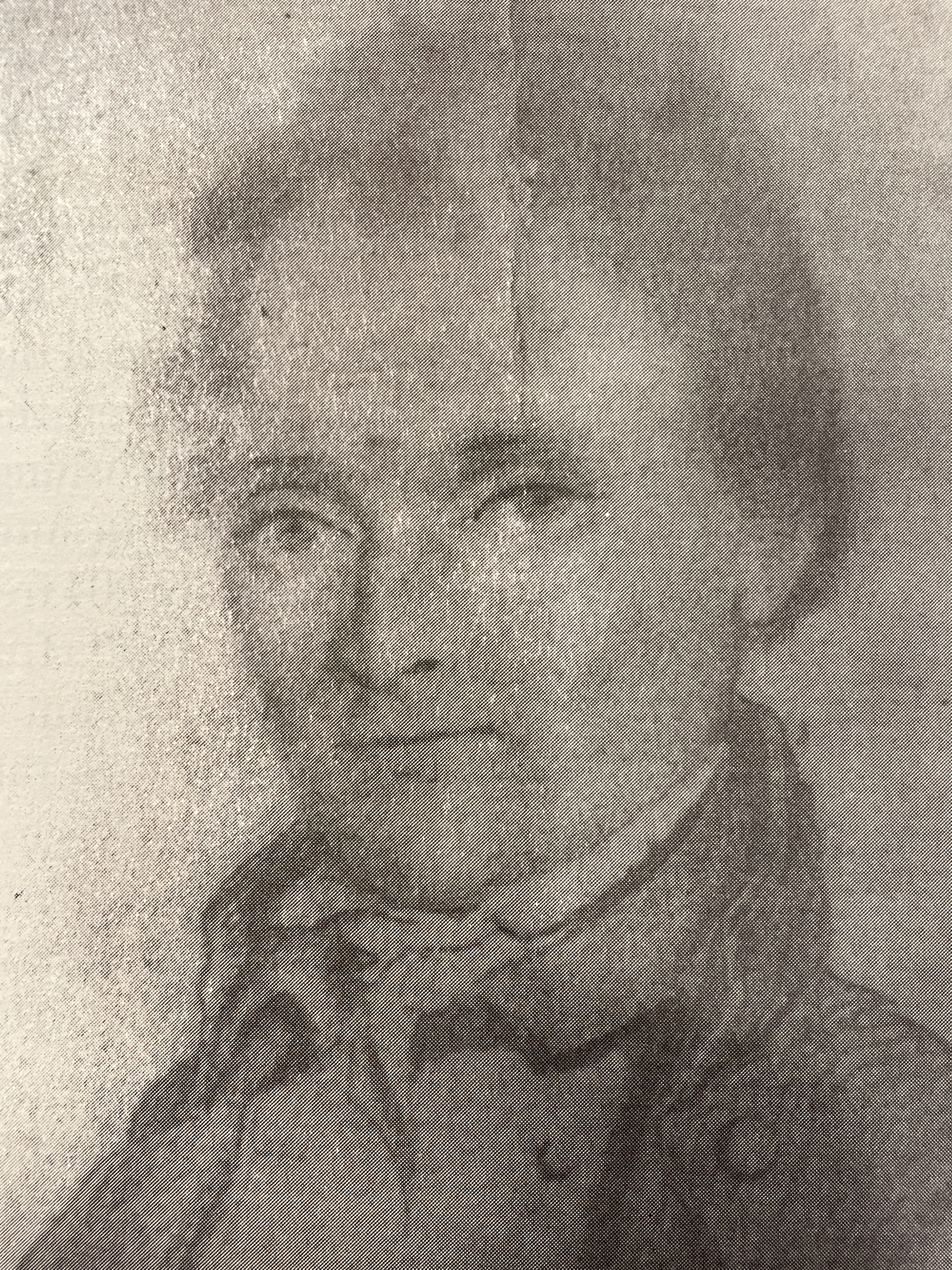
Photograph of pencil sketch likely commemorating West Ford's freedom, circa 1805. This cabinet card (a style of photograph) was donated to Mount Vernon in 1985.

== Moving to Mount Vernon, gaining freedom, inheriting land ==
When Bushrod Washington—a judge on the U.S. Supreme Court who was the son of John and Hannah—inherited Mount Vernon upon the death of his uncle George, he brought his personal slaves with him including West Ford, Jenny (West’s grandmother), Venus (West’s mother), and Bettey (sister to West).

Along with Ford's jobs of carpenter and gardener, he would become the main guardian of George Washington's tomb as many visitors were known to flock to his gravesite. West was granted his freedom around 1805.

Ford fathered four children—William, Daniel, Jane, and Julia—with his wife, Priscilla Ford, a free black woman from Alexandria. Their children were born free, and were educated on the Mount Vernon Plantation. When Bushrod Washington (nephew and heir to Mount Vernon after the death of Washington) died in 1829 without issue, he willed land to three of his nephews and a niece, also including Ford who was given 160 acres of land on Little Hunting Creek. One of his grandsons was Major George W. Ford.

== Founding Gum Springs ==
In 1833, Ford sold the land he inherited from Bushrod Washington, to buy a larger plot of 214 acres, located two miles north at Gum Springs Farm. He divided his new land into four equal parcels for his children in 1857. At that time, Ford was the second richest free black farmer in Fairfax County, Virginia.

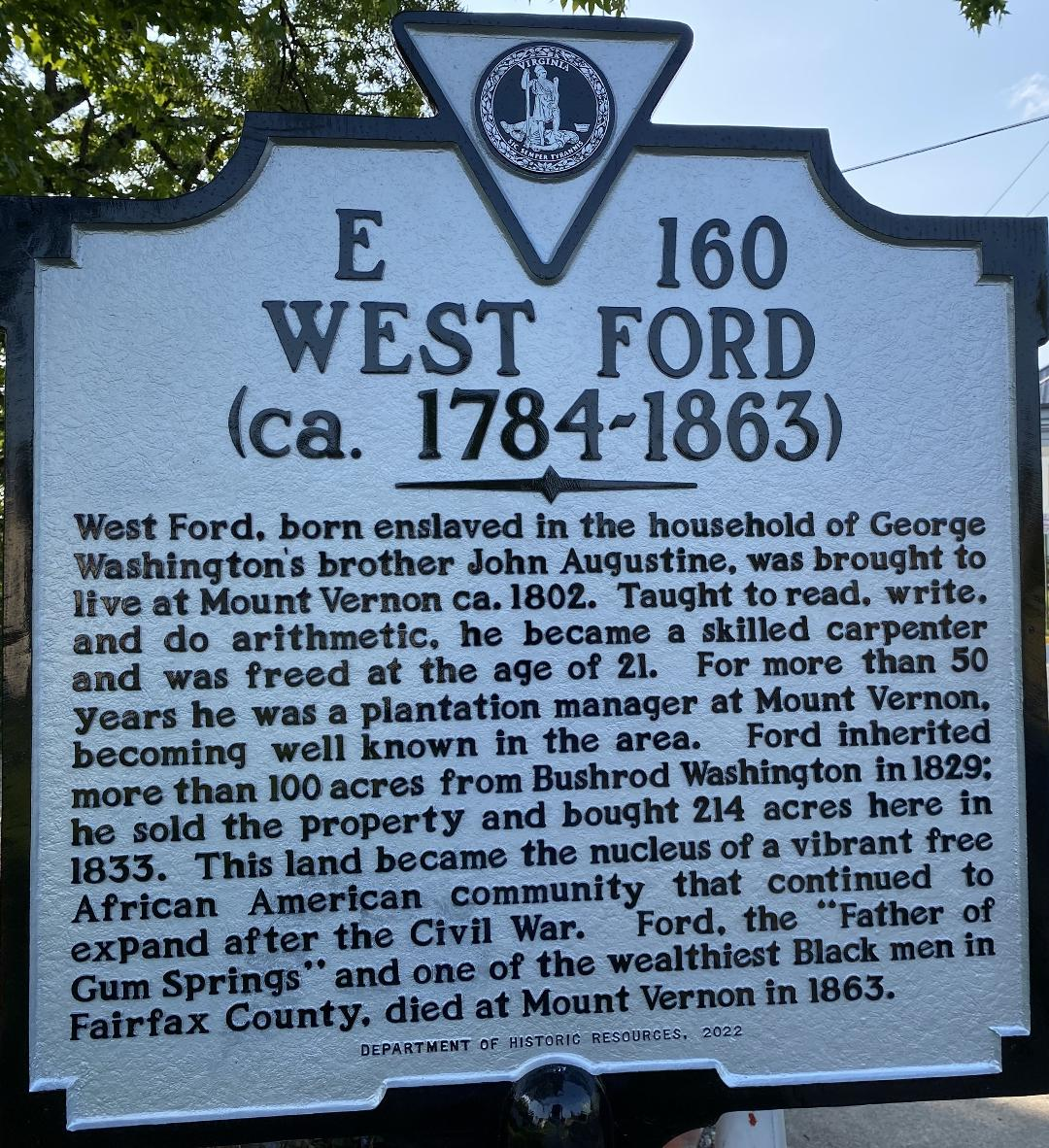
West Ford Historical Highway Marker, Gum Springs, Virginia. Photo by M. Hollis 2022.

Gum Springs Farm was the nucleus of a black community throughout the 19th century, a depot for blacks before and after the Civil War; Ford later became known as the "founder and father of Gum Springs". In view of its 1833 establishment, Gum Springs, Virginia is the oldest African American settlement in Fairfax County. A Virginia State historical marker honoring Ford was placed in Gum Springs on Fordson Road in June 2023.

== Later life ==
West Ford was frequently highlighted in news publications during his tenure at Mount Vernon, making his private life a matter of public record. In 1850, two Virginia newspapers—the Alexandria Gazette and the Virginia Advertiser—carried articles describing his prestigious position and authority at Mount Vernon. Another article was written by Benson J. Lossing, who was a prolific and popular American historian and a personal friend of George Washington Parke Custis (grandson of Martha Washington and step-grandson of George). Lossing asked after his interview if he could sketch West's picture. West told him he needed to clean up a bit as, "Artists make colored folks look bad enough anyhow." After the sketch was finished, West signed his name with Lossing's pencil at the bottom of the drawing. Lossing submitted the article for print in the Harpers New Monthly Magazine. This 1859 drawing can be seen at top right.

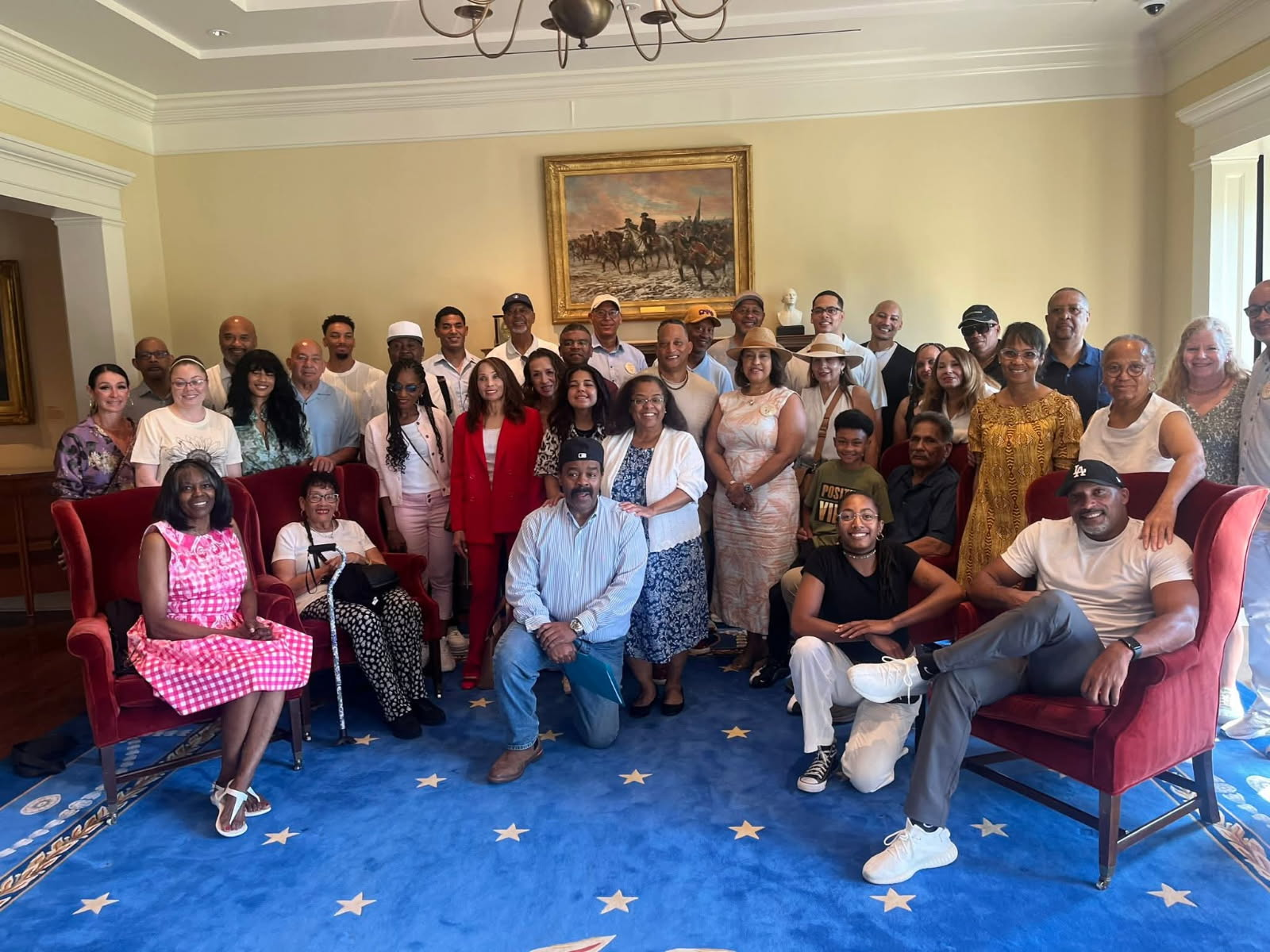
Linda Allen Hollis (in red) and other West Ford descendants at Mount Vernon in June 2025

When the Mount Vernon Ladies' Association bought the Mount Vernon Plantation in 1858, Ford became a valuable source of information about the original appearance of the estate in George Washington's day. He had managed the Mount Vernon estate during most of his adult life for George Washington’s heir Bushrod Washington, then for Bushrod’s heir John Augustine Washington II (grandson of George Washington’s brother John), and then for the latter’s son John Augustine Washington III. When Ford became ill in 1863, he was brought to Mount Vernon to be cared for by the Association. He died on July 20 of that year in the mansion house. His obituary appeared in the Alexandria Gazette Newspaper and read:

West Ford, an aged colored man, who has lived on the Mount Vernon estate the greater portion of his life, died yesterday afternoon at his home on the estate. He was, we hear, in his 79th year of his age. He was well known to most of our older citizens.

== Washington fatherhood controversy ==
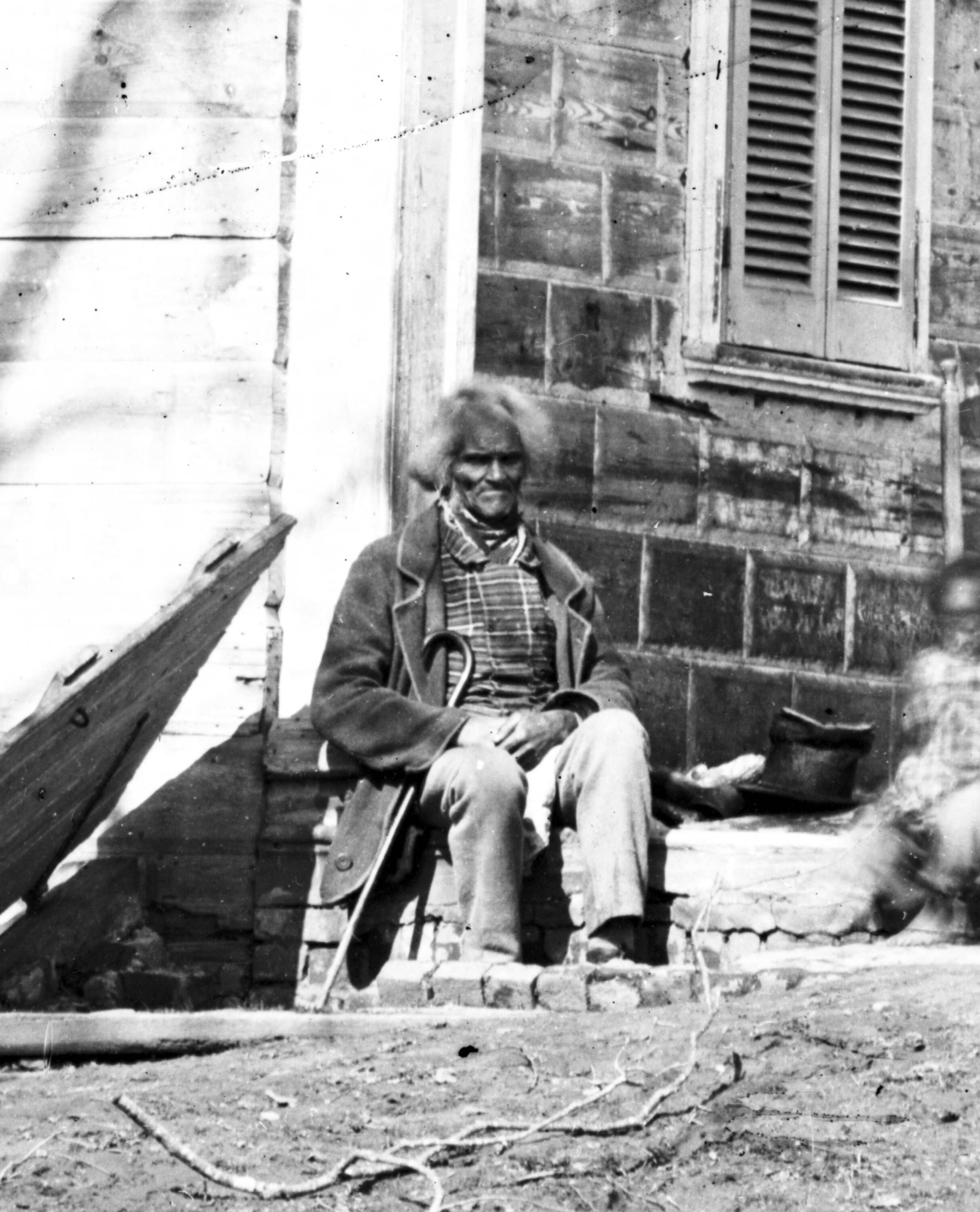
Photograph believed to be of Ford taken at Mount Vernon in 1858

Descendants of Ford maintain, through their family's oral tradition, that George Washington was the father of West Ford. They also have gathered documentation including historical accounts, scholarly works on Washington, last wills and testaments, drawings, tax records, census data, and personal letters. The controversy about whether Washington was Ford's father first surfaced in 1940. The Ford family's claim gained greater publicity after DNA tests carried out in 1999 lent support to the asserted connection between Thomas Jefferson and children born to his enslaved servant and companion Sally Hemings.

Hannah and her enslaved maid, Venus, per Washington's diary, visited Mount Vernon, where George Washington was in residence, sometime between July 1784 and January 1785. It can be inferred that Venus was in George's company at least three recorded times from George's diary in 1785. The dates the brothers (George and John) were in each other's company are June 1785, October 1785, October 1786. A detailed explanation on possible dates of interaction has been compiled and published by historian and author John Wayland.

An argument against George Washington's paternity is that he fathered no children with Martha Washington. As she bore four children in her previous marriage, some sources state that Washington was infertile, perhaps due to an early bout with smallpox or tuberculosis, though studies have shown that smallpox does not always cause sterility. In a letter written in 1786 (West Ford's birth date is believed to be around 1784–1786) to a nephew, George Washington expressed his opinion that it was not because of himself that he was childless with his wife. The letter also stated that he had no biological children:

If Mrs. Washington should survive me there is moral certainty of my dying without issue, and should I be the longest liver, the matter in my opinion is almost as certain; for whilst I retain the reasoning faculties I shall never marry a girl and it is not probable th[a]t I should have children by a woman of an age suitable to my own should I be disposed to enter into a second marriage.

Some speculate that it was Martha Washington who could not conceive a child with her husband. Authors William Rasmussen and Robert Tilton have written that, "According to a tradition passed down in Masonic circles, Martha Washington would have needed some sort of corrective surgery in order to conceive additional children, after the birth of Patsy." But regardless of whether Martha Washington could biologically have had children after her marriage to George, most historians believe that George could not, despite his own expressed opinion.

DNA testing has not been carried out even though the family has asked for it to be conducted. In 1994, locks of hair supposedly from George Washington were given to the FBI for testing, but not enough DNA was recovered to make analysis possible. In addition, West Ford's exact burial site is unknown. His family has stated that his body was placed in the old tomb of Washington upon his death and now it is thought his body was buried in Mount Vernon's Enslaved Burial Ground along with burials of perhaps 50 to 75 other individuals. Without corroborating evidence including DNA, or favorable treatment to indicate a relationship, establishing a relationship between the two is challenging. Linda Allen Hollis, the Ford family's official chronicler, is conducting new DNA research and gathering information from extended family branches to help substantiate the claim that West Ford was the son of George Washington. However if evidence was able to be found it still may be possible to discern if the two men were father and son. According to Bushrod Washington biographer Gerard Magliocca, it is more logical that West Ford's father was one of the four Washington men who lived at Bushfield plantation when Ford's mother was there. (Bushfield is where West Ford grew up before moving to Mount Vernon in 1802.)

== See also ==
- List of enslaved people of Mount Vernon
