= Gum Springs, Virginia =

Unincorporated community in Virginia, United States

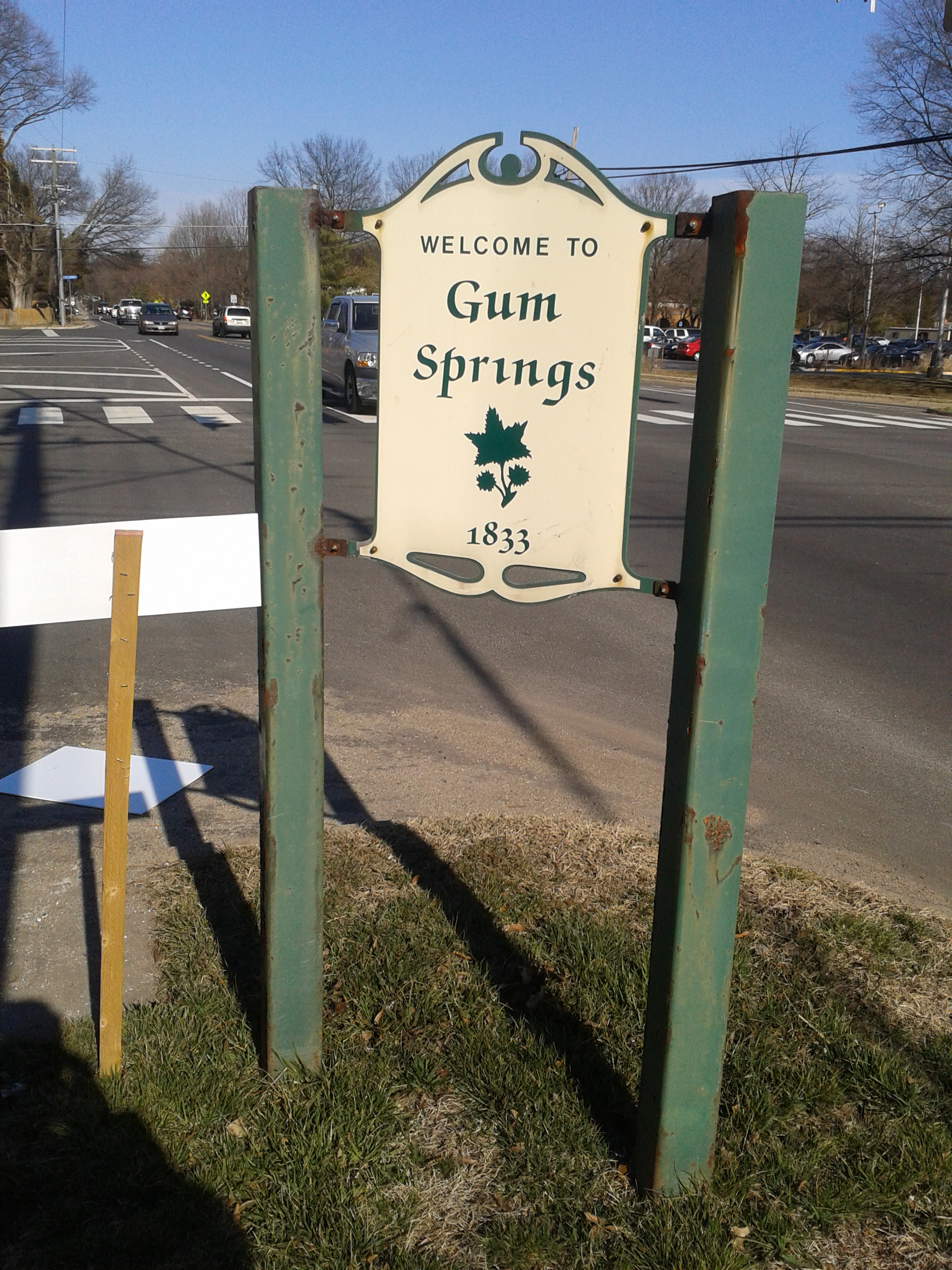
Welcome to Gum Springs

Gum Springs is a community in Fairfax County, Virginia, United States in Hybla Valley, along Route 1 (Richmond Highway). The African American community, the oldest in the county, was established in 1833 by West Ford, a freedman who had been manumitted by Hannah Bushrod Washington (widow of John Augustine Washington), in 1805. A historical marker (Number E-04) was erected by the Virginia Department of Historic Resources in 1991.

== History ==
=== Founding ===
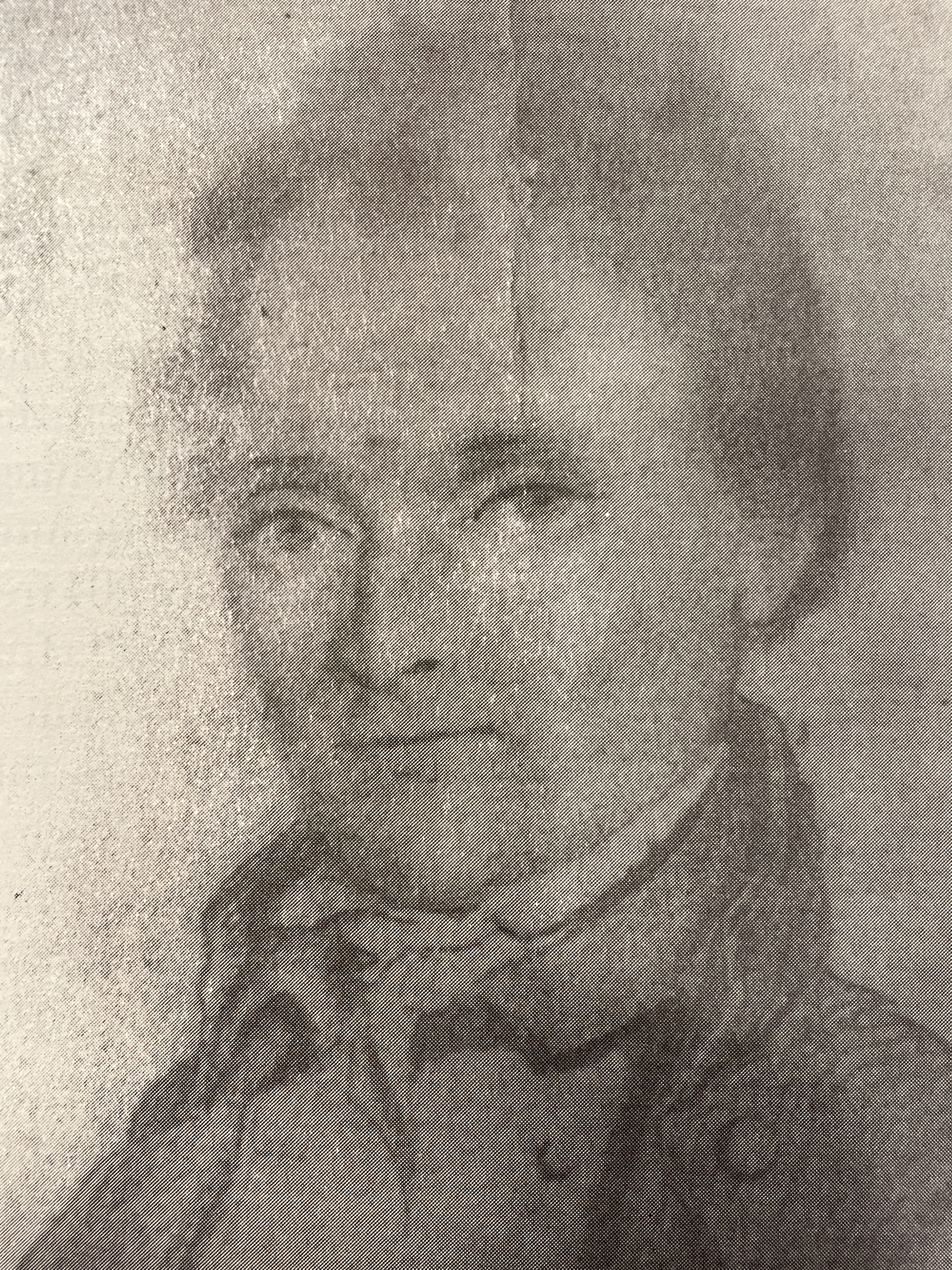
Gum Springs' founder, West Ford

In 1833, Gum Springs was founded by West Ford, a freed slave, skilled carpenter, and manager on George Washington's plantation, Mount Vernon. Ford was able to develop this 214-acre farming community from the sale of land he inherited from Hannah Washington, the sister-in-law of George Washington. By 1866, Ford was the second richest free black farmer in Fairfax County, Virginia. Gum Springs Farm became the nucleus of an African-American community throughout the 1800s.

=== Gum Springs School ===
The school was established after the Civil War.

=== Bethlehem Baptist Church ===
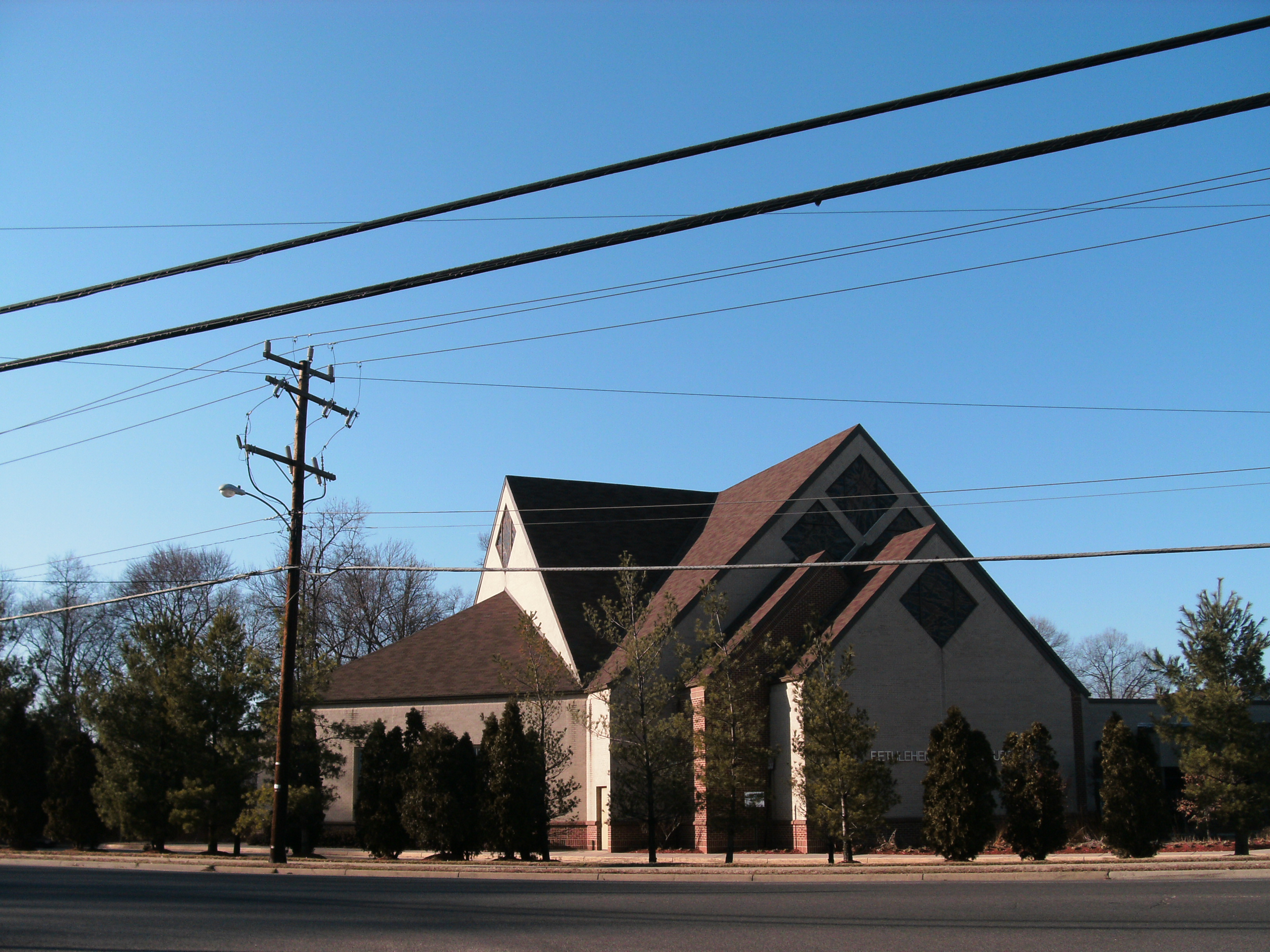
Bethlehem Baptist Church

The church was established in 1863.

=== Odd Fellows Hall ===
The Pride of Fairfax Lodge #298 building, formerly known as the Mount Vernon Enterprise Lodge No. 3488, is listed on the Fairfax County Inventory of Historic Sites and was listed to the Virginia Landmarks Register in 2021 and the National Register of Historic Places in 2022.

=== Joint Stock Club ===
In 1890, the Joint Stock Club was formed by five men. This endeavor helped create a safe place for African Americans to obtain land. All land was collaboratively bought, sold and subdivided at cost to other African Americans at a price of $30 an acre.

=== Gum Springs Historical Society and Museum ===
Gum Springs Historical Society and Museum is dedicated to preserving the legacy of Gum Springs Community and regularly disseminates information that tells the story of the Community's economic struggle and dedication to building an African-American community. A historical marker is located at the corner of Richmond Highway and Fordson Road ( 38° 44.909′ N, 77° 4.965′ W).

== Notable people ==
- West Ford
- Saunders B. Moon
- Annie M. (Dandridge) Smith
- Reverend Samuel K. Taylor
