= Spring Grove (Mount Holly, Virginia) =

Historic house in Virginia, United States

- U.S. National Register of Historic Places
- Virginia Landmarks Register
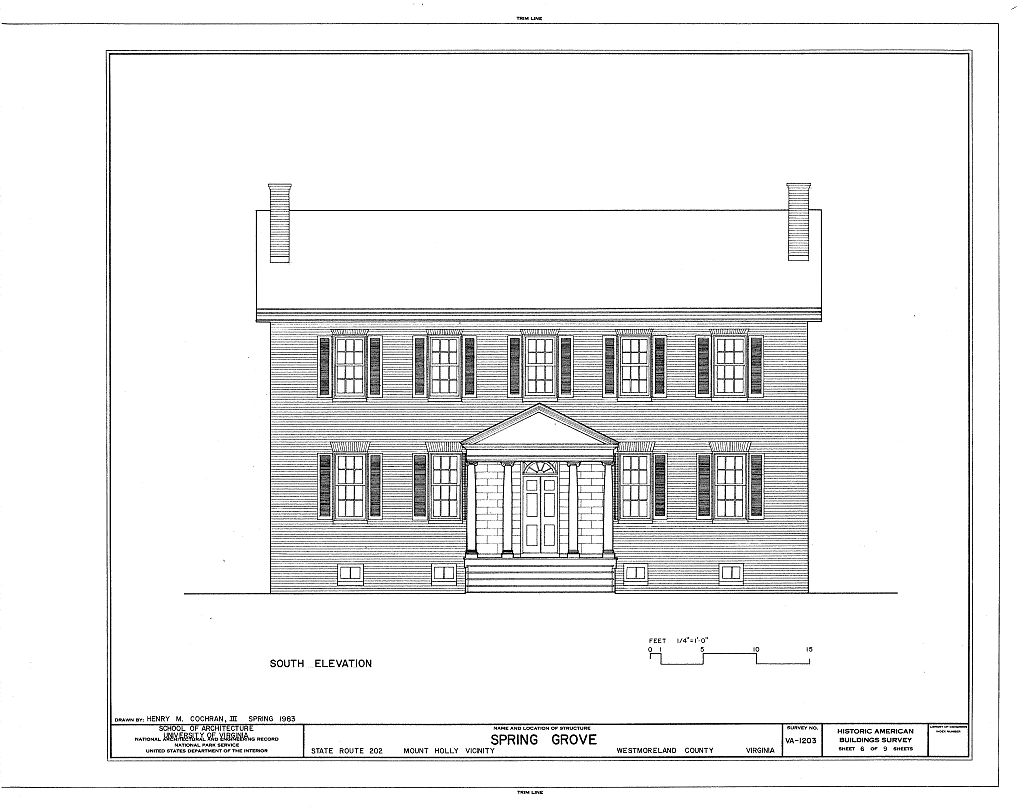
- HABS drawing of Spring Grove

- Location within Virginia Location within the United States
- Location: VA 202, Mount Holly, Virginia
- Coordinates: 38°5′9″N 76°42′20″W
- Area: 27 acres (11 ha)
- Built: 1834
- Architectural style: Greek Revival, Federal
- NRHP reference No.: 85003130
- VLR No.: 096-0023

Significant dates
- Added to NRHP: October 10, 1985
- Designated VLR: June 21, 1983

Spring Grove is a historic home located at Mount Holly, Westmoreland County, Virginia. It was built in 1834, and is a two-story, five-bay, brick farmhouse. The interior features pattern book inspired Greek Revival and Federal style woodwork and plasterwork. The front facade features a pedimented tetrastyle portico in an Ionic order. Also on the property are a contributing smokehouse and kitchen.

It was listed on the National Register of Historic Places in 1985.
