= Bushfield (Mount Holly, Virginia) =

Historic house in Virginia, United States

- U.S. National Register of Historic Places
- Virginia Landmarks Register
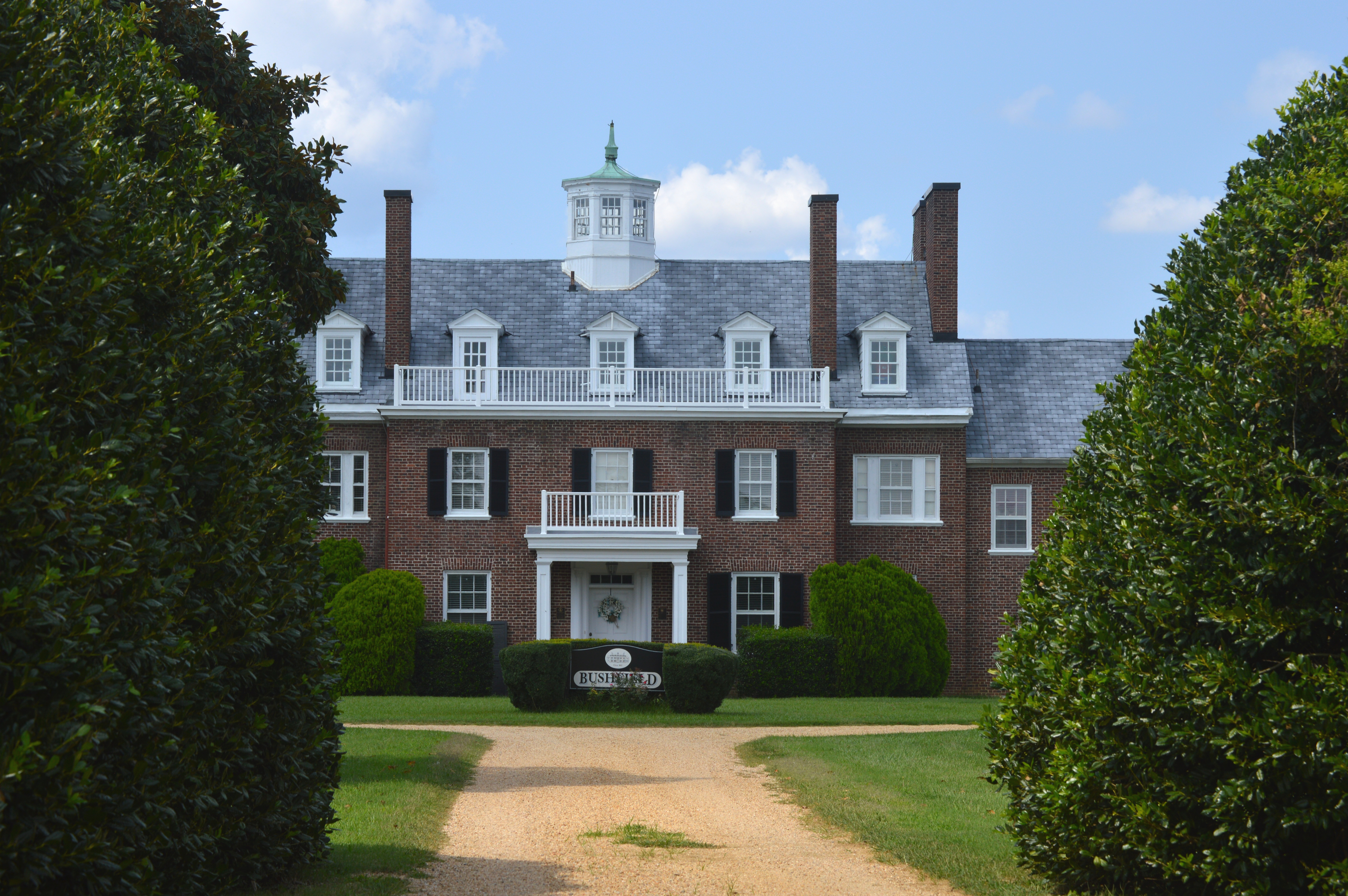
- Front of the house

- Location within Virginia Location within the United States
- Location: 367 Club House Loop, Mount Holly, Virginia
- Coordinates: 38°8′0″N 76°42′51″W
- Area: 6 acres (2.4 ha)
- Built: 1751, Renovated 1916
- Architect: Waddy Butler Wood, Richardson & Burgess, Inc.
- Architectural style: Colonial Revival
- NRHP reference No.: 04000053
- VLR No.: 096-0052

Significant dates
- Added to NRHP: February 11, 2004
- Designated VLR: October 5, 2003

Bushfield, also known as Bushfield Manor, is a historic 2 1/2-story Flemish bond, 18th century brick Colonial Revival mansion located in Mount Holly, Westmoreland County, Virginia.

Bushfield is the former homestead of John Augustine Washington, younger brother to George Washington, and his wife, Hannah Bushrod Washington. The plantation is located on Nomini Creek and the Potomac River, and was divided throughout the 19th century. The dwelling house was remodeled in the early 20th century by noted architect, Waddy Butler Wood.

During research for its historic nomination, Historian Kimble A. David, of Norfolk located a 1916 letter describing a contractual agreement for a remodeling project at Bushfield. The renovation was so extensive that many came to believe incorrectly that the house was first built at that time.

The origins of the Mount Holly property have been proven so conclusively that it was named to the National Register of Historic Places in 2004.

Wood enlarged the 18th century original home of the family of George Washington. Its National Register of Historic Places listing is based on its 1916 renovation discussed below. Also on the property are a contributing Bungalow-style caretaker's House, barn, silo, and cemetery.

== History ==
Bushfield, on Nomini Creek, was the family plantation of John Bushrod, whose father (of the same name) had bought it from Rice Maddox. Hannah Bushrod (daughter of the former Mildred Corbin, who married the younger John Bushrod) married John Augustine Washington in 1756. Bushfield was about 20 miles down the King's Highway from the oldest Washington family plantation—700 acres called "Head of Maddox" (meaning Mattox Creek, a tributary of the Potomac River), which Augustine Washington in 1743 willed to that same John Augustine Washington, his younger son. While his older brother George Washington was surveying western lands, John Augustine Washington brought his bride to Mount Vernon further up the Potomac River, then managed that plantation until George Washington married Martha Custis and brought her to Mount Vernon, which John Augustine Washington left in September 1761, after selling his brother some cattle.

John and Hannah Washington would have sons Bushrod, Corbin, and William Augustine Washington, and daughters Mary and Jenny.

John Bushrod, by his February 1760 will (admitted to probate by the end of that year), bequeathed Bushfield, its land, furniture and 35 slaves to Hannah Bushrod Washington, and three slaves each to his granddaughters Mary and Jenny. John A. Washington and his family visited Mount Vernon many times between 1760 and John's death on January 10, 1787, the last recorded being a three-day visit in October 1786. John A. Washington had given his son Bushrod 41 slaves as a marriage deed of gift, which specified they would be deducted from his share of the estate. John Washington then wrote a will in 1784 (that gave his widow dower rights in 1/3 of his slaves (some named) and divided his land among his sons Bushrod and Corbin Washington, among other specified legacies) and a codicil in November 1785—which were both admitted to probate in Westmoreland County on July 31, 1787. In addition to his Westmoreland County plantations, John A. Washington had purchased 213 acres near and town lots in Berkeley Springs. Many Bushrods, as well as John Augustine Washington, and Corbin Washington and his wife (the former Hannah Lee) would all be buried at Bushfield, although Corbin and his wife both died in Fairfax County in the winter of 1799–1800. Although several of the gravestones were missing in the Bushfield graveyard in 1944, two stone tombs remain and replacement markers were added, so 14 graves are known.

Bushrod Washington sold Bushfield in 1804, and it was resold several times by the century's end.

== Renovation ==
In 1916, prominent Chicagoan Mark Skinner Willing, heir to the Marshall Field & Company retailing fortune, hired architect Waddy Butler Wood, who renovated and enlarged the dwelling in the Colonial Revival style, expanding an existing dwelling on both sides, with side gable roofs. A portico and lantern reflect the property's association with the family of George Washington. Waddy Butler Wood's father was from Virginia, and although the architect was born in St. Louis, Missouri, he was raised in Gloucester County, Virginia and educated at Virginia Tech. In the early 20th century, Wood became a prominent architect in the national capital area, for both government and private buildings. He preferred the Colonial Revival style and had earlier renovated the interior of another former Washington family house, Woodlawn.

Mark Skinner Willing was the son and heir of Henry J. Willing who was a partner in the Marshall Field Department Store. His mother was Frances Skinner who was the daughter of Mark Skinner a prominent Chicago lawyer and supporter of Abraham Lincoln. Upon retiring from Marshall Field Henry J. Willing became a real estate developer in Chicago. In 1895 Mark Skinner Willing married Margaret McFaden, the daughter of Robert and Rose McFaden of Chicago. He was the son of a prominent family from Quincy, Illinois. Mark Skinner Willing, eschewing Chicago where the family lived on Walton Place and in Lake Forest, where he had constructed a home on Lake Michigan, bought the old Bushfield Plantation which was located on a peninsular between Nomini and Buckner Creeks in Westmoreland County, Virginia. His first purchase was for the existing 18th c. home and the property around it. Subsequently he bought property to complete his purchase of the entire peninsula. In 1915 he engaged Waddy Wood of Washington D.C. as architect for the project to greatly enlarge the still standing Bushfield Manor House for his family which now included three daughters (Margaret Woodbridge, Evelyn Pierpont, and Frances) and in 1920 a son, Mark Skinner Willing, Jr. Brick from the old house was used in the partial construction of the Willing home. So remote was Bushfield (getting there involved an overnight on a Chesapeake Bay steamer from Baltimore) that it took 7 years to complete the transformation of Bushfield into a Georgian Revival brick mansion. Mr. Willing and Mr. Wood sited the house to take maximum advantage of the views to the Potomac River and to catch the breeze off the river. The family at first resided there during the fall and spring but increasingly during the Depression and World War II spent more time there and made Bushfield their primary home. In addition to constructing farm buildings for a working farm and a plant to produce electricity, Mr.Willing installed a tennis court and a golf course for his family. Mr. Willing died in 1944 and the house and farm were sold to Mrs. St. John. Mrs. Willing returned to Chicago and died there in 1948. Margaret Willing married and resided in Chicago as did Mark S. Willing Jr. Evelyn Willing, upon her marriage, remained in Virginia and resided in Tappahannock, Virginia.
