= Bushrod Washington =

US Supreme Court justice from 1798 to 1829

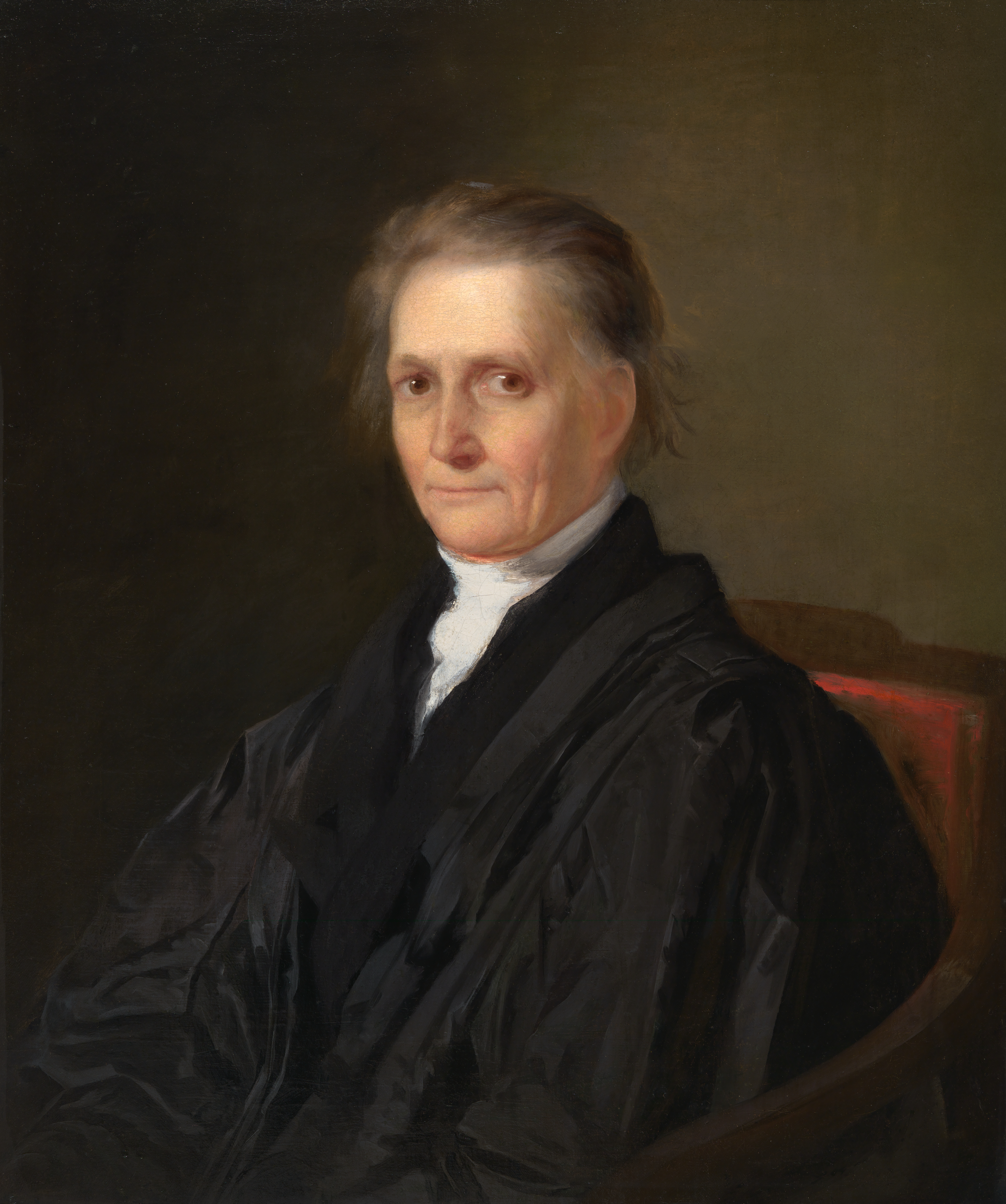
- Portrait by Chester Harding, 1828

Associate Justice of the Supreme Court of the United States
- In office November 9, 1798 – November 26, 1829
- Nominated by: John Adams
- Preceded by: James Wilson
- Succeeded by: Henry Baldwin

Member of the Virginia House of Delegates from Westmoreland County
- In office October 15, 1787 – June 23, 1788 Serving with Richard Lee
- Preceded by: Daniel McCarty
- Succeeded by: William A. Washington

Personal details
- Born: June 5, 1762 Mount Holly, Virginia, British America
- Died: November 26, 1829 (aged 67) Philadelphia, Pennsylvania, U.S.
- Party: Federalist
- Spouse: Julia Anne (Anna) Blackburn
- Parent(s): John Augustine Washington; Hannah Bushrod
- Relatives: Washington family
- Education: College of William and Mary (BA)

Military service
- Allegiance: United States
- Branch/service: Continental Army
- Years of service: 1781–1782
- Rank: Private
- Unit: 3rd Virginia Regiment
- Battles/wars: American Revolutionary War: Battle of Green Spring; Siege of Yorktown

Bushrod Washington (June 5, 1762 – November 26, 1829) was an American attorney and politician from the Washington family who served as Associate Justice of the Supreme Court of the United States from 1798 to 1829. On the Supreme Court, he was a staunch ally of Chief Justice John Marshall.

Washington was a co-founder and president of the American Colonization Society, which promoted the emigration of former slaves to Africa. The nephew of American Founding Father and President George Washington, he inherited his uncle's papers and Mount Vernon, taking possession in 1802 after the death of Martha Washington, his uncle's widow, and with Marshall's help, published a biography of the first president.

== Early life ==
Bushrod Washington was born on June 5, 1762, at Bushfield Manor, a plantation located at Mount Holly in Westmoreland County, Virginia. He was a son of John Augustine Washington, the brother of George Washington, and John's heiress wife, Hannah Bushrod. He had a younger brother and two older sisters, all married into the First Families of Virginia.

=== Education ===
Bushrod Washington received his initial classical schooling from a private tutor who also taught the children of Richard Henry Lee, who lived nearby in Westmoreland County. He then traveled to Williamsburg for further studies and despite some school closures related to the American Revolutionary War and British raids nearby, graduated from the College of William & Mary in 1778, although only 16 years old. He returned in the summer of 1780 to study law under George Wythe and during that time as an alumnus became the 41st member of Phi Beta Kappa.

In Williamsburg he became acquainted with young veteran John Marshall, who was taking a six-week course from Wythe. As discussed below, Washington soon would enlist in the war's final campaign. Although his friend Marshall was already practicing law in Virginia, after that military service, Bushrod traveled to Philadelphia for further legal studies (financed by his uncle, the President) under James Wilson, then a prominent lawyer and soon-to-be Supreme Court justice as well as law professor at the University of Pennsylvania.

=== Military service ===
The College of William and Mary had been occupied by soldiers several times during the American Revolutionary War. Washington joined the Continental Army in 1781, serving as a private of dragoons in Colonel John Francis Mercer’s cavalry, the 3rd Virginia Regiment. Although he remained a private until the war ended and the troop disbanded in 1782, he and his cousin Ludwell Lee fought in the Battle of Green Spring, and he witnessed General Cornwallis’s surrender to George Washington at Yorktown.

=== Marriage ===
Bushrod Washington married Julia Anne (Anna) Blackburn, the daughter of Col. Thomas Blackburn of Prince William County, Virginia, a former aide de camp to General Washington and planter who also served in the Virginia General Assembly. The marriage took place in a panelled ballroom known as “the Best Room” in Blackburn’s house, Rippon Lodge. They had no children, and she died days after her husband while accompanying their niece and nephew to Virginia and her husband's funeral.

== Legal and political careers ==
After concluding his studies with Wilson in April 1784, Washington returned to Westmoreland County and opened a law office. He continued his private legal practice from 1784 to 1798. In 1789, he and his new bride moved into a newly constructed house at 521 Duke Street in Alexandria, Virginia, which may have been built as a wedding present, which he kept as one of his residences for decades.

Westmoreland County voters elected Washington as one of their two representatives in the Virginia House of Delegates in 1787, where he served along with veteran Richard Henry Lee. The following year, he won another election and attended the Virginia Ratifying Convention (this time alongside Henry Lee), where he voted for ratification of the U.S. Constitution. In 1789 he published a two-volume Reports of the Virginia Court of Appeals, 1790-96, and, three decades later, with R. Peters, published decisions of the United States Court for the Third Circuit, 1803-27 in four volumes.

== Supreme Court of the United States ==
On September 29, 1798, President John Adams gave Washington, then 36 years old, a recess appointment as an associate justice of the United States Supreme Court, to a seat vacated by James Wilson. He was sworn into office on November 9, 1798. Formally nominated on December 19, 1798, Washington was confirmed by the United States Senate on the following day. He served on the Supreme Court until he died in 1829.

After John Marshall became chief justice in 1801, Washington voted with Marshall on all but three occasions (one being Ogden v. Saunders). During his Supreme Court tenure, Washington authored the opinion in Corfield v. Coryell, 6 Fed. Cas. 546 (C.C.E.D. Penn. 1823). In Corfield, Washington listed several rights that he deemed were fundamental "privileges and immunities of citizens in the several States."

== Planter and George Washington's executor ==
By 1787, the year of his father's death and a Virginia tax census, Washington enslaved nine adults and 25 children (all supervised by an overseer) and owned land as well as nine horses (including stud horses), 59 cattle, and six carriage wheels in Westmoreland County. He also enslaved nine adults and four children in Berkeley County (that became West Virginia after the American Civil War) and his brother Corbin (the other primary beneficiary of J. A. Washington's will) enslaved 27 adults and 26 children there, owning 17 horses including a stud horse and 40 cattle.

Coat of arms of the Washington family

Around 1795, Washington purchased Belvidere, the former Richmond estate of William Byrd III. Thus, while handling cases and taking the notes that would make him the reporter for Virginia's appellate court, Washington primarily lived in Richmond. Washington sold Belvidere upon being appointed to the Supreme Court in 1798. When former President George Washington died in December 1799, Lawrence Lewis, who had married Nelly Custis and hoped to inherit Mount Vernon, initially chose not to invite Bushrod Washington to the funeral, only Dr. Stuart (the guardian for the Custis children), Mr. Law and Mr. Peter (who had married the other Custis daughters) and G.W.P. Custis. Dispatches were sent to the rest of the late President's possible heirs the following day so that none could attend the funeral held on the fourth day after the President's death. When the will was read, Lewis was named an executor but only received Woodlawn plantation where he lived. The President named Bushrod Washington to receive Mount Vernon and be an executor. Other executors (who would prove less active in carrying out the will's terms and managing the property) were Martha Washington and one man from each branch of the Augustine Washington family. When Mrs. Washington died, Bushrod Washington was notified. Still, according to tradition, Lawrence and Nellie Lewis did not invite him to the post-funeral dinner, so he asked an enslaved person to prepare and bring food to him in a cabin.

Upon his aunt Martha Washington's death in 1802, Bushrod Washington inherited all of George Washington's papers as well the largest part of his estate, including the Mount Vernon plantation, according to the terms of his late uncle's will. George Washington's will freed the people George enslaved after his wife Martha died, giving her control of them during her lifetime. However, Martha feared she might be poisoned, and so after consulting with Bushrod, signed a deed of manumission in 1800 and freed the enslaved people before she died. Thus, when Bushrod Washington and his wife moved to Mount Vernon in 1802, he brought people he enslaved. In 1803, Bushrod Washington and Lawrence Lewis (with the consent of the remaining executors) allowed the other heirs to buy various parcels of real estate in the estate. Not all potential heirs chose to participate, and some of those who bought parcels never paid for them, which led to further legal problems.

== Enslaver and American Colonization Society president ==
The contrast in his treatment of two groups of enslaved people would later become an issue. At the request of his mother, Hannah Bushrod, before her death, Bushrod and his brothers freed an enslaved mulatto man named West Ford. Ford was likely their brother, cousin, or nephew, born in Westmoreland County in 1784, and who would become the overseer of enslaved domestic workers at Mount Vernon. Ford would help protect George Washington's house and tomb from the British during the War of 1812 (and from many visitors before and after the conflict), alongside a man named Oliver Smith, who had been raised alongside Bushrod Washington as his personal servant, as was the custom of the time.

There are discrepancies among scholars about the paternity of West Ford, some of it based on the oral history of Ford's descendants, that West Ford may have been fathered either by George Washington, or Bushrod Washington, but there is no direct evidence for either. Although Ford's mother was Venus, a woman enslaved by Bushrod's mother, who died in 1801 and freed him in her will, the precise identify of his white father is unknown, only that his grandson, George W. Ford, born in Alexandria, Virginia, in 1847 would become a Buffalo soldier and the first African American national cemetery superintendent. Bushrod Washington's will also gave land to West Ford. The Mount Vernon estate did not include much cash, and Washington would not support elderly formerly enslaved people as required by his late uncle's will. Washington instead maintained the plantation's mansion on the proceeds from the property and his Supreme Court salary. Over time, Washington sold many enslaved people, stating that he could thereby support the main house, property, and elderly formerly enslaved people.

Justice Joseph Story said the mansion appeared deteriorated when he visited his colleague. However, other visitors to the American South also noticed many examples of property deterioration there, especially compared to the Northern States, including Philip Fithian (who tutored the children of Councilor Robert Carter in Westmoreland County in 1773–1774, but whose letters were not published until the 20th century), Alexis de Tocqueville (who toured the county in 1831 and wrote about the subject in 1835 and again in 1855) and Frederick Law Olmsted (who toured the South from 1852 until 1857, publishing dispatches in the New York Daily Times which were collected and republished in 1856, 1857 and 1860). For many years, Bushrod Washington and his cousin Lawrence Lewis administered George Washington's estate. In fact, the estate would not be closed until more than a decade after Bushrod Washington's death.

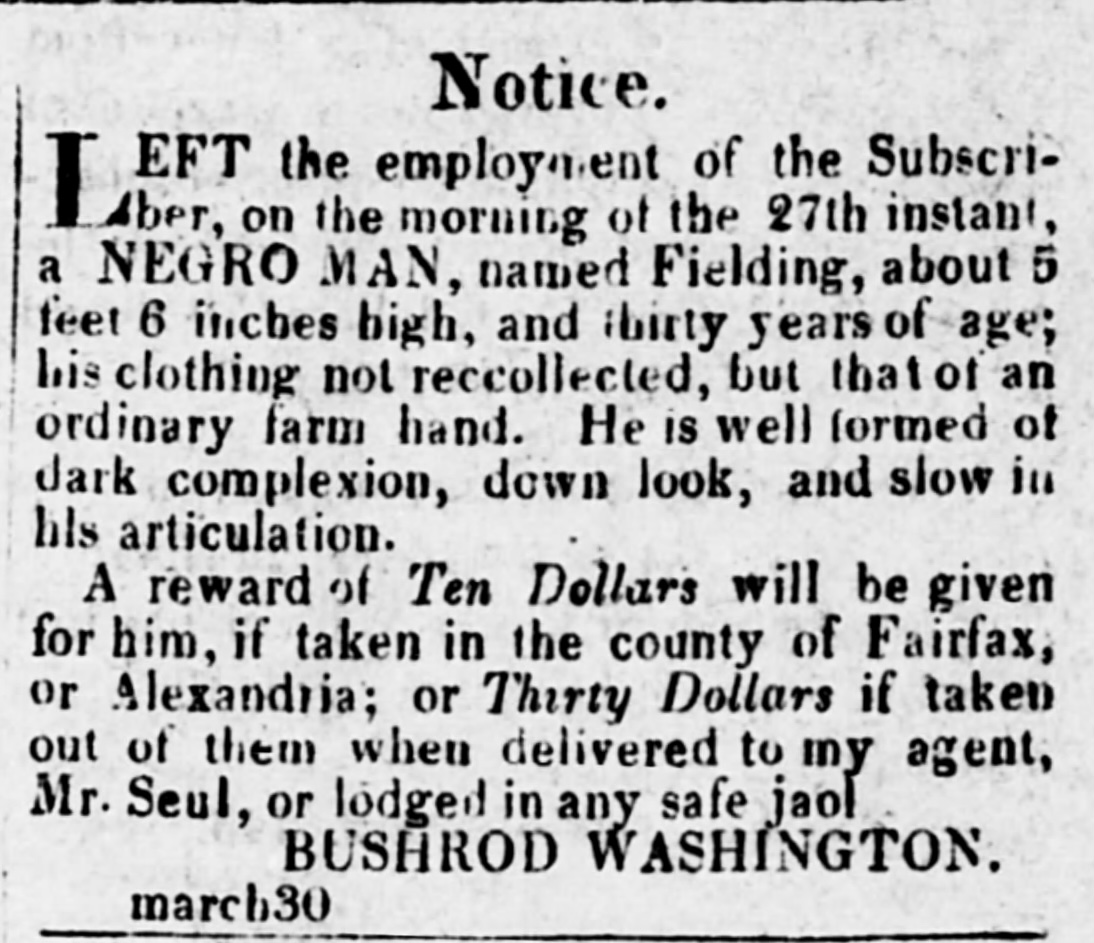
Washington placed a runaway slave ad in the Alexandria Gazette of April 4, 1821, seeking the return of Fielding, reward $10

Meanwhile, Bushrod Washington helped found the American Colonization Society (ACS) to encourage and support the migration of freeborn people of color and emancipated slaves to the continent of Africa at the Davis Hotel in Washington, D.C., on December 21, 1816. He became its national president (lending the prestige of the Washington name to its fundraising) and remained so until he died in 1829. His decades-long friend, Chief Justice John Marshall, joined the organization as a life member shortly after its founding and became president of its Richmond branch. In the 1810 census, the Mount Vernon plantation included 71 enslaved people, and one of his nephews of the same name also enslaved people in Fairfax County. A decade later, Bushrod Washington enslaved 83 people at Mount Vernon. His practice of selling enslaved people to support Mount Vernon's upkeep or his lifestyle angered abolitionists, who questioned why the ACS president could not set an example by freeing the people he enslaved, as had his uncle George Washington. Some believed that Washington should have sent them to Liberia.

In particular, Hezekiah Niles in his nationally distributed Weekly Register questioned Washington's sale of 54 enslaved people from Mount Vernon in 1821 and reprinted a letter Washington had sent to the editor of a Baltimore federalist paper on the subject, as well as an August article in a Leesburg, Virginia, paper that noted that a "drove of 100 negroes" were walked westward through the town the previous Saturday. Washington responded in print several times, advising that he had sold 54 enslaved people the previous March for $10,000 for use on plantations in Louisiana's Red River area, and the contract promised that families would not be broken up. Niles questioned the justice of the action, insisted that he was not disrespecting Washington, and did not discuss the economics of shipping from the port of Alexandria compared to the lengthy foot journey the coffle was undertaking. Washington insisted the sale was justified by the economics of plantation management, insubordination of the enslaved people, and the likelihood that more would escape northward.

== Other memberships ==
In 1805 Washington was elected a member of the American Philosophical Society in Philadelphia. He was elected to membership in the American Antiquarian Society in 1813, a year after the Society's founding in 1812.

== Death and legacy ==
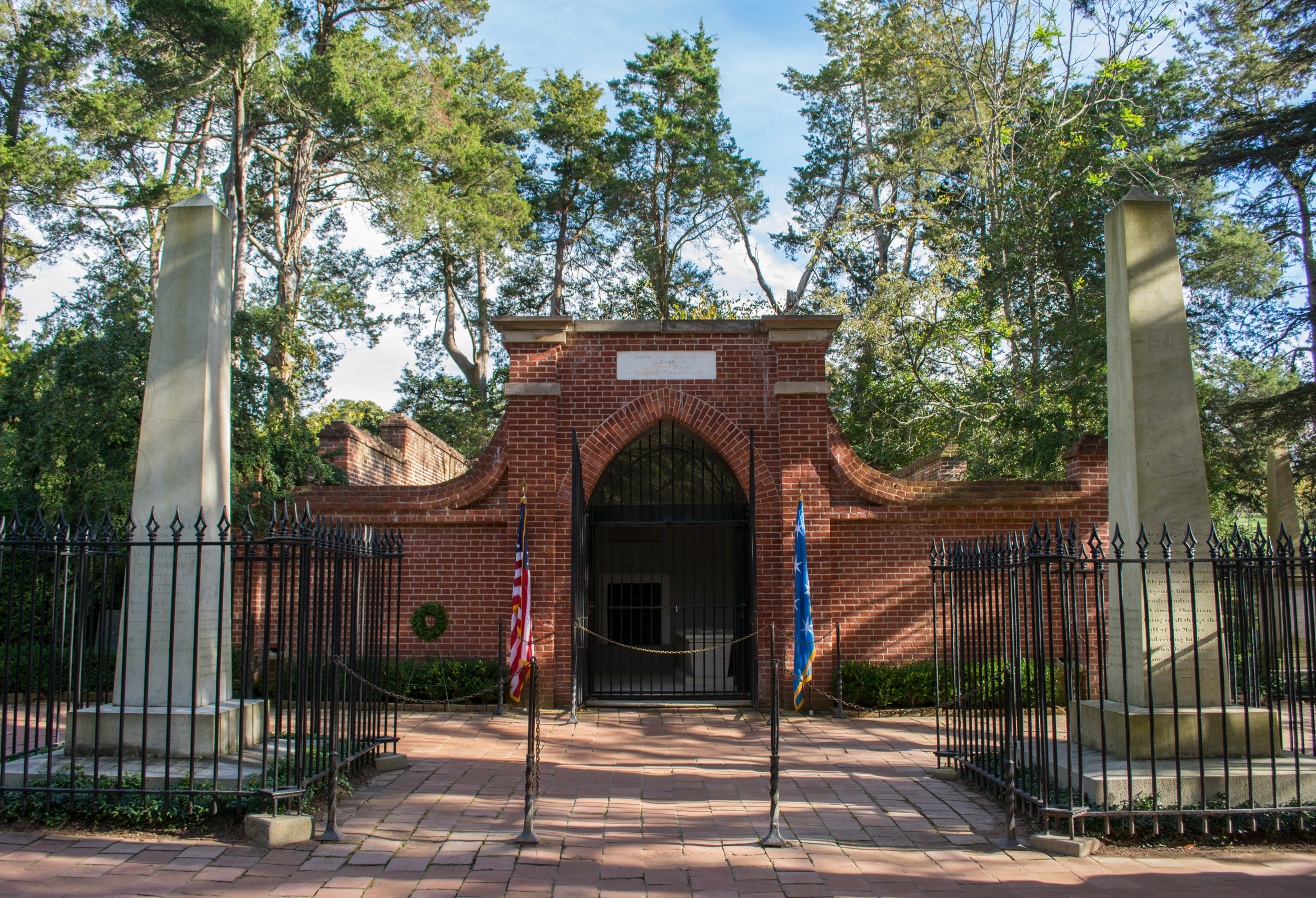
Washington family tomb at Mount Vernon in 2014. Bushrod Washington's remains are interred in a vault at the rear of the tomb. His memorial is the obelisk at the right side of the photograph.

Washington died in Philadelphia, Pennsylvania, on November 26, 1829, while riding circuit. His wife died two days later while transporting his body for burial. Both are interred in a vault within the Washington family tomb at Mount Vernon. An obelisk erected in front of the tomb memorializes Bushrod and his wife.

In 1830, his former colleague, U.S. District Judge Joseph Hopkinson, published a memorial. In 1858, Horace Binney privately printed a short encomium. Although one source claimed that Bushrod Washington kept meticulous correspondence files, his correspondence is believed to have burned after his death. Various institutions have partial collections, including the Library of Congress, the Pennsylvania Historical Society and the Chicago Historical Society. The University of Virginia's library is collecting and digitizing them.

Because of his role in the ACS and his assistance in founding the Republic of Liberia, Bushrod Island near the national capital of Monrovia was named for him.

== See also ==
- List of federal judges appointed by John Adams
- List of United States federal judges by longevity of service

Legal offices
Preceded by James Wilson	Associate Justice of the Supreme Court of the United States; 1798–1829	Succeeded by Henry Baldwin
