= Manual High School (Peoria, Illinois) =

Manual Academy

Location
- 811 S. Griswold St. Peoria, Illinois 61605; United States
- 40°40′49″N 89°38′3″W

Information
- School type: Public
- Founded: 1909
- School district: Peoria Public Schools District 150
- Superintendent: Sharon Desmoulin-Kherat
- Principal: Devon Hawks
- Staff: 41.75 (FTE)
- Enrollment: 713 (2023-2024)
- Student to teacher ratio: 17.08
- Colors: Orange and Black
- Athletics conference: Big Twelve Conference
- Mascot: Ram
- Nickname: Rams
- Rival: Peoria Lions
- Website: Manual Academy

Manual Academy (formerly Manual Training High School and later Manual High School) is a public high school located in the south end of Peoria, Illinois. It is the southernmost of the three city high schools operated by the Peoria Public Schools.

== History ==
Manual opened as Manual Training High School in 1909, and moved from its Lincoln avenue site to a new building located at 811 S. Griswold in January 1963.

== Academics ==
In recent years, Manual is increasing student enrollment, which has been as low as 450 students and as high as 1200 students.

After failing to meet the federal requirements of the No Child Left Behind Act, Manual went through a mandated restructuring in 2008.

Manual High School improved its tests scores during the 2009–2010 school year to meet federal safe harbor.

== Athletics ==
Manual's nickname is the Rams and the school colors are orange and black.

In the 1950s and early 1960s Manual was a central Illinois football powerhouse. Manual was undefeated in 1958, 1959, 1960 and 1962 in the Mid-State Eight Conference. The culmination of the season was the traditional "Turkey Day" Thanksgiving game against Peoria High School, often drawing 10,000 to Peoria Stadium (where all Peoria high school home games were played). During those years there was no state football playoffs. Ken Hinrichs was the football coach, and is in the Illinois Coaches' Hall of Fame. His won-lost record at Manual over 17 years was 121-40-7 (.752). This record is the strongest ever compiled by an area coach with a tenure of more than ten years.

Manual won the IHSA state boys basketball title in 1930 and four straight Class 2A titles in 1994, 1995, 1996, and 1997. The 1994 team was coached by Dick Van Scyoc. The 1995–97 teams were coached by Wayne McClain.

== Alumni ==
Manual alumni number in the many thousands and are involved in all walks of life in Peoria and elsewhere.

A 100-year Centennial All Class Reunion Weekend celebration was held Friday – Sunday September 11–13, 2009.

=== Notable alumni ===
- Montana of 300 — American rapper, singer and songwriter
- Rita Ali — 47th Mayor of Peoria
- Jack Brickhouse — Hall of Fame sports announcer
- Mark Clark — Black Panther who was killed alongside Fred Hampton
- Linda Hollis — historian
- Sergio McClain (1997) — former head basketball coach at Parkland College and University of Illinois basketball player
- Adam Miller (transferred) — college basketball player
- Howard Nathan (1991) — former NBA player
- Louis Skidmore (1915) — co-founder of Skidmore, Owings & Merrill
- Al Smith (1965) — basketball player: ABA and NBA (1971–74 Denver Rockets; 1974–76 Utah Stars; 3803 points)
- Frank Williams (1998) — former NBA player

== See also ==
- Illinois Mr. Basketball
- Peoria metropolitan area
