= Mount Holly, Virginia =

Unincorporated community in Virginia, US

Coordinates: 38.091659°N 76.718018°W

Mount Holly is an unincorporated community in Westmoreland County, in the U. S. state of Virginia.

The plantation houses Bushfield and Spring Grove are nearby and are listed on the National Register of Historic Places.

== Notable people ==
- W. Tayloe Murphy (1901–1962), state delegate and state senator
- Bushrod Washington (1762–1829), nephew of George Washington and Associate Justice of the Supreme Court of the United States
