= George W. Ford (Buffalo Soldier) =

US military officer (1847-1939)

George William Ford
- Born: November 23, 1847; Alexandria, Virginia
- Died: June 20, 1939 (aged 91)
- Burial place: Camp Butler Cemetery
- Military career
- Allegiance: (United States) United States; Union
- Branch: United States Army; Union Army
- Rank: Major
- Conflicts: Spanish–American War

George William Ford was a U.S. military officer in the Spanish American War and a Buffalo Soldier. Born in Alexandria, Virginia, at George Washington's Mount Vernon Plantation, he joined the 10th Cavalry in 1867 at age 19.

Ford was assigned to Company L. He and his fellow troops protected railroad working crews, and escorted stages and supply wagons.

Ford died in 1939 in Springfield, Illinois, at the age of 91. He was honored with a full military funeral and buried at Camp Butler National Cemetery. He was the last surviving member of the original 10th United States Cavalry.

== Early life ==
Ford was born on November 23, 1847. He was the son of William West and Henrietta Bruce Ford, who were both born free. Ford was the grandson of West Ford, who, in Ford’s oral history, is the African-American son of George Washington. West Ford's story is detailed in the narrative nonfiction book, I Cannot Tell a Lie: The True Story of George Washington's African American Descendants.

All the Ford offspring were educated along with the Washington children at the Mount Vernon Schoolhouse. Ford and his brothers became guardians of the first president's tomb, a position that was handed down to their sons.

Before the Civil War, William Ford moved his family to New York to stay with his wife's relatives. At the end of the Civil War, Ford and his family moved back to Virginia, where they owned a farm next to Mount Vernon.

== Military career ==
=== 10th Cavalry ===
In 1866, Congress passed legislation establishing two cavalry and four infantry regiments of Black men. Ford joined the call to enlist because it gave him purpose and a chance to obtain equal rights in a country that had just finished fighting a Civil War over slavery. At the age of 19, he enlisted with the legendary 10th Cavalry, Company L. He was stationed at Fort Leavenworth in Kansas for his basic training. His commanding officer was Colonel Benjamin Grierson, who was one of the foremost cavalry officers of the Civil War.

The 10th Cavalry's focus during Ford’s enlistment was keeping the peace between the settlers and the confederated tribes. Ford also served as a mail courier for troops L and D between Ft. Arbuckle, Kansas, and Ft. Gibson, Indiana.

During his second tour of duty, Ford was elevated to sergeant, and his company was sent to Texas under the command of Colonel Wood.

Ford served ten years with his regiment, and was honorably discharged with the rank of regimental quartermaster sergeant. He was commended in General Orders No. 53, Fort Sill, for acts of good judgment and gallantry.

=== Spanish-American War ===
Ford was 50 years old when he voluntarily enlisted for the Spanish-American War with the rank of major with the Second Battalion of 23rd Kansas Volunteers. Ford and the other Black soldiers going to Cuba were called the "Immune Troops."

== Later life ==
In 1879, Ford married Harriet Bythewood. The couple had eight children: George Jr., James Irwin, Noel Bertram, Elise, Vera, Harriet, Cecil Bruce, and Donald. After Ford mustered out of the military, he worked at Arlington Cemetery for a few months before he was appointed as the superintendent at Chattanooga National Cemetery in Tennessee on November 9, 1878. He was the first African-American to receive this honor. He managed five national cemeteries during his lifetime. Ford finally retired on October 20, 1930, after spending 53 years of service to the establishment.

Continuing with his love of public service, Ford met W.E.B. Du Bois. He accepted an advisory position as secretary of the Army-Navy Committee in the Niagara Movement, a precursor to the NAACP. He also served as the first African-American president of the NAACP branch in Springfield, Illinois, where he fought for equal rights for all.

Ford died in 1939 at 91 of bronchial pneumonia at his home in Springfield, Illinois. He was honored with a full military funeral, and is buried at Camp Butler National Cemetery.
