= Mattox Creek =

River in Westmoreland County, Virginia, United States

Coordinates: 38.21152°N 76.95664°W

Location
- Country: United States
- State: Virginia
- County: Westmoreland County

Physical characteristics
- Mouth
  - location: Potomac River
  - elevation: 0 feet (0 m)
- Length: 13.9 mi (22.4 km)

Mattox Creek is a tributary of the Potomac River in the Washington District of Westmoreland County, Virginia, near the colonial stagecoach stop of Oak Grove. The creek is 13.9 miles (22.4 km) long, and the lower 3 miles (5 km) of the creek is navigable. It lies between, and only minutes from, the birthplaces of George Washington and James Monroe.

Washington's great-grandfather, John Washington, came to the area in 1656 aboard an English merchant ship which ran aground in the vicinity. After the ship was refloated, second mate Washington decided to stay in the area as a guest of Col. Nathaniel Pope, whose daughter, Anne, he fell in love with. Lawrence Washington, grandfather of George Washington, was born in 1659 at Mattox Creek. The land along Mattox Creek on which he was born was the wedding gift to his father and mother, by Lawrence's grandfather Pope. Lawrence was the first child born in the colonies of America to a Washington family seeking a new life and fortune following the English Civil War. His father John Washington's purchase of 5,000 acres (20 km^{2}) of land and his appointments to county and colony leadership positions were in keeping with the family's English royalist allegiances. A prominent Washington name had thus been established in the Colony of Virginia.

Mattox Creek was a thriving port of trade in such commodities as tobacco, fruits and vegetables due to the fertile fields in the region. During the Civil War, Confederate troops operated a supply base on the right bank of the creek. Several Union Navy ships, including USS Wyandank, USS Stepping Stones, and USS Don were on routine patrol to blockade the supply route. A battle broke out in March 1865, with several ships being sunk and a landsman named Aaron Anderson becoming one of the first African Americans to receive the Medal of Honor for his bravery on the creek that day.

Ferries provided transportation needs across the creek prior to construction of the Route 205 bridge in 1930. The existing bridge, long suffering from structural deficiencies, Is being replaced in a phased construction process which started 15 July 2014 and will continue for approximately 2 years.

Today Mattox Creek is a beautiful wildlife and recreation area used for boating, skiing, fishing and swimming. Bald eagles, ospreys, herons, beavers, foxes, deer and migrating waterfowl are abundant in the area. The area has been protected and improved by the Chesapeake Bay Act, which has made wetland protection and environmental issues a priority in the entire Chesapeake Bay watershed.

== See also ==
- List of rivers of Virginia
