= 1876 United States presidential election =

Election of Rutherford B. Hayes

- November 7, 1876

369 members of the Electoral College 185 electoral votes needed to win
- Turnout: 82.6% (▲10.5 pp)
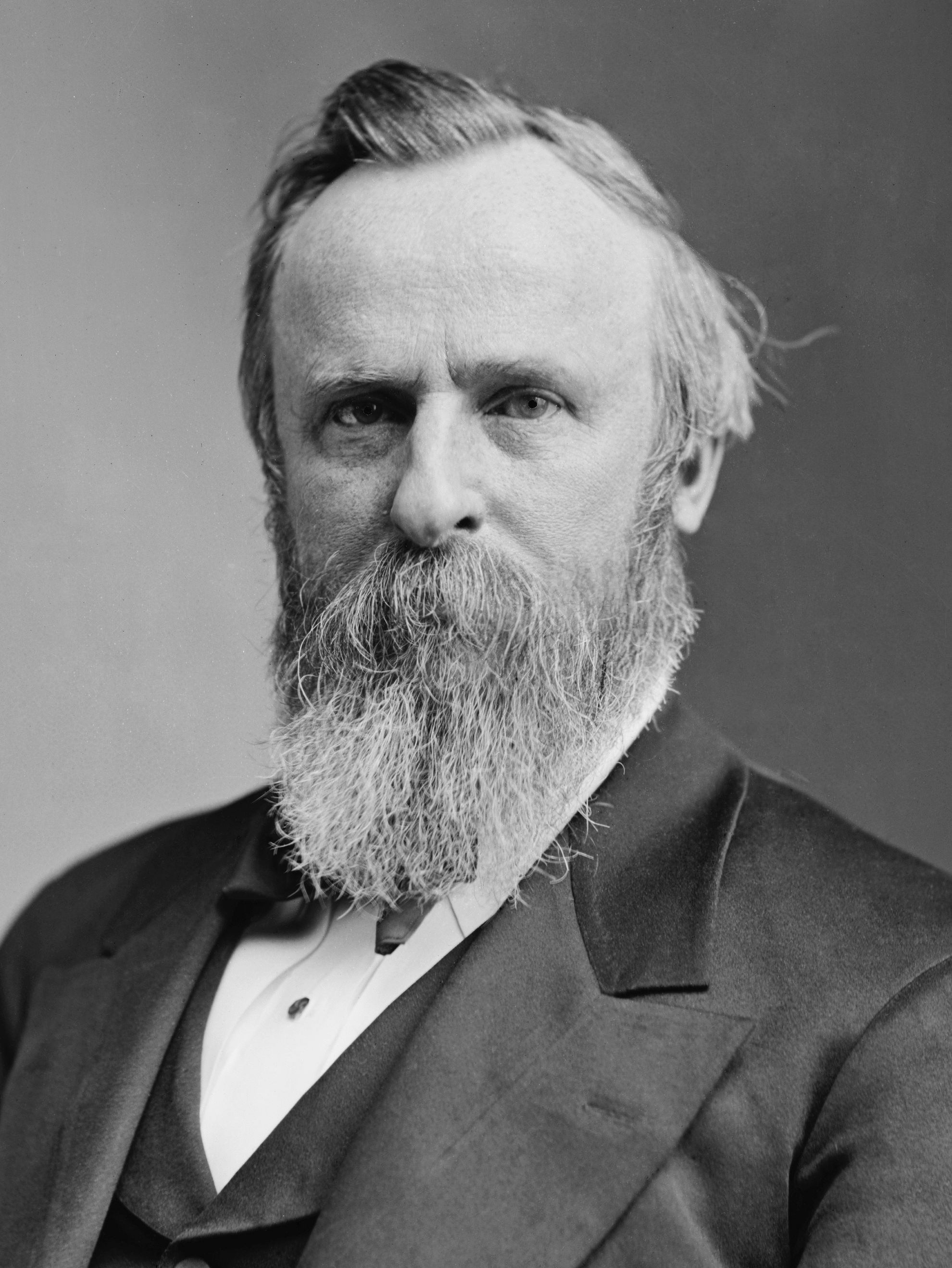

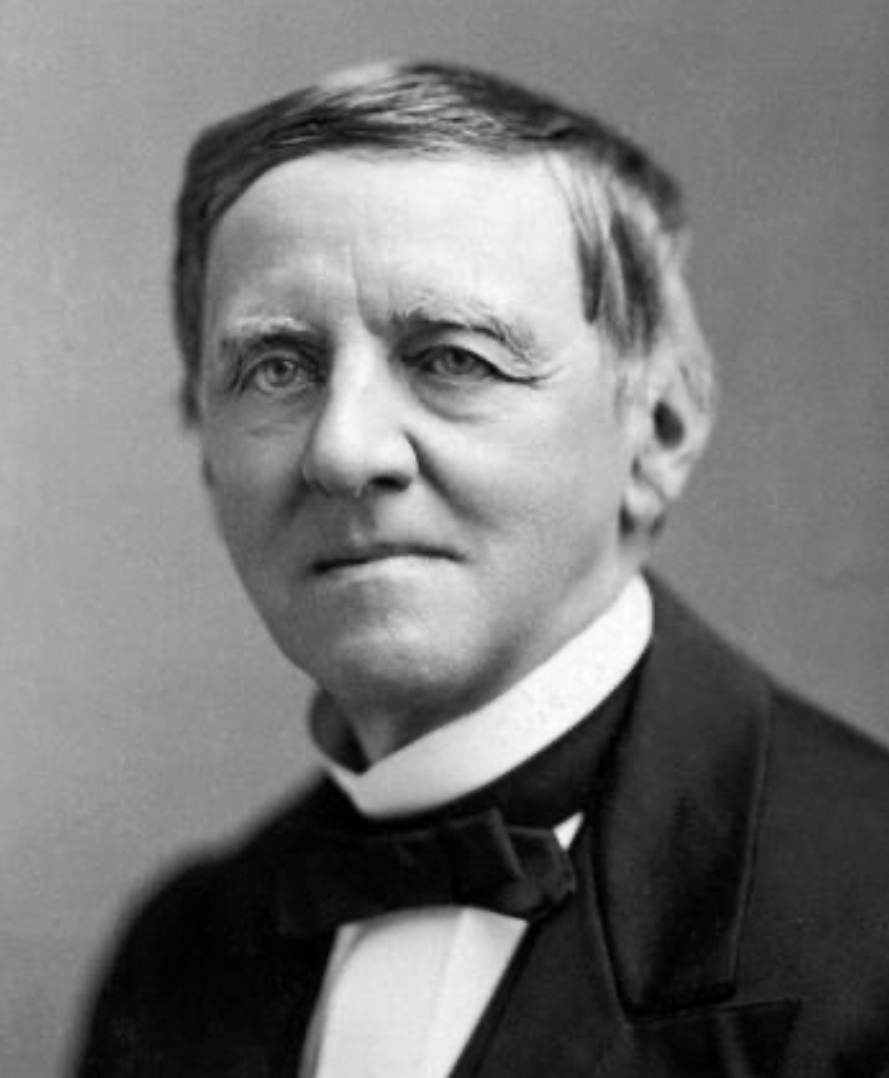
Nominee	Rutherford B. Hayes	Samuel J. Tilden
Party	Republican	Democratic
Home state	Ohio	New York
Running mate	William A. Wheeler	Thomas A. Hendricks
Electoral vote	185	184
States carried	21	17
Popular vote	4,034,142	4,286,808
Percentage	47.9%	50.9%
- Presidential election results map. Red denotes states won by Hayes/Wheeler, blue denotes those won by Tilden/Hendricks. Numbers indicate the number of electoral votes allotted to each state.
President before election
Ulysses S. Grant
Republican
Elected President
Rutherford B. Hayes
Republican

A presidential election was held in the United States on November 7, 1876. The Republican ticket of Governor Rutherford B. Hayes of Ohio and House Representative William A. Wheeler of New York very narrowly defeated the Democratic ticket of Governor Samuel J. Tilden of New York and Governor Thomas A. Hendricks of Indiana.

Following President Ulysses S. Grant's decision to retire after his second term, U.S. Representative James G. Blaine emerged as frontrunner for the Republican nomination; however, Blaine was unable to win a majority at the 1876 Republican National Convention, which settled on Hayes as a compromise candidate. The 1876 Democratic National Convention nominated Tilden on the second ballot.

The election was among the most contentious in American history, and was widely speculated to have been resolved by the Compromise of 1877, in which Hayes supposedly agreed to end Reconstruction in exchange for the presidency. In the first count, Tilden had 184 electoral votes (one vote short of a majority) to Hayes's 163, with the 22 votes from Florida, Louisiana, South Carolina, and Oregon disputed. To address this constitutional crisis, Congress established the Electoral Commission, which awarded all twenty-two votes and thus the presidency to Hayes in a strict party-line vote. Some Democratic representatives filibustered the commission's decision, hoping to prevent Hayes's inauguration; their filibuster was ultimately ended by party leader Samuel J. Randall. On March 2, 1877, the House and Senate confirmed Hayes as president. This was the last election taken under Reconstruction, in which some Southern states voted for a Republican candidate. Following the election, Southern states were able to fully implement Jim Crow laws, disenfranchising black Americans, and beginning a period of Democratic domination known as the Solid South. No Republican presidential nominee would win a former Confederate state until Warren G. Harding won Tennessee in the 1920 United States presidential election.

It was the fifth of six consecutive presidential election victories for the Republican Party and the second of five U.S. presidential elections in which the winner did not win a plurality of the national popular vote, after the 1824 election. Although Tilden defeated Hayes in the official popular vote tally, the election involved substantial electoral fraud, voter intimidation by paramilitary groups such as the Red Shirts, and disenfranchisement of black Republicans. The election had the highest voter turnout of the eligible voting-age population in American history, at 82.6%. Tilden's share of the popular vote, 50.9%, is the largest received by a candidate who was not elected to the presidency and makes him the only presidential candidate in American history to lose despite winning an outright majority of the popular vote. Tilden was also the last person to win an outright majority of the popular vote until William McKinley in 1896. As of 2024, this remains the only presidential election in which both candidates were sitting governors, and was the last presidential election during which the presidential electors of a state (Colorado) were appointed at the discretion of the state legislature rather than by popular vote.

== Nominations ==
=== Republican Party nomination ===
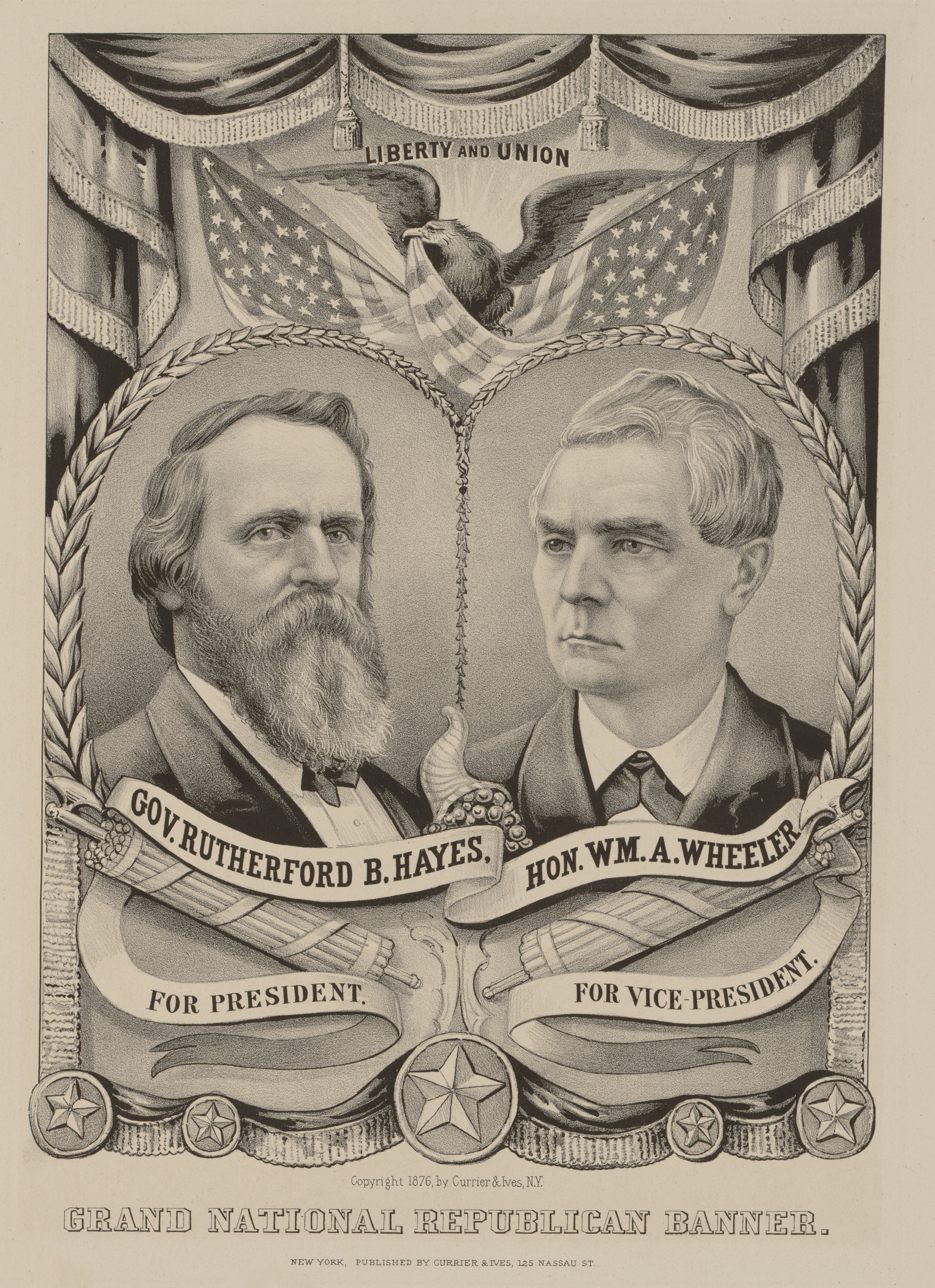
Hayes/Wheeler campaign poster

Republican Party (United States) 1876 Republican Party ticket
Rutherford B. Hayes	William A. Wheeler
for President	for Vice President
29th & 32nd Governor of Ohio (1868–1872 & 1876–1877)	U.S. Representative for New York's 19th (1861–1863 & 1869–1877)

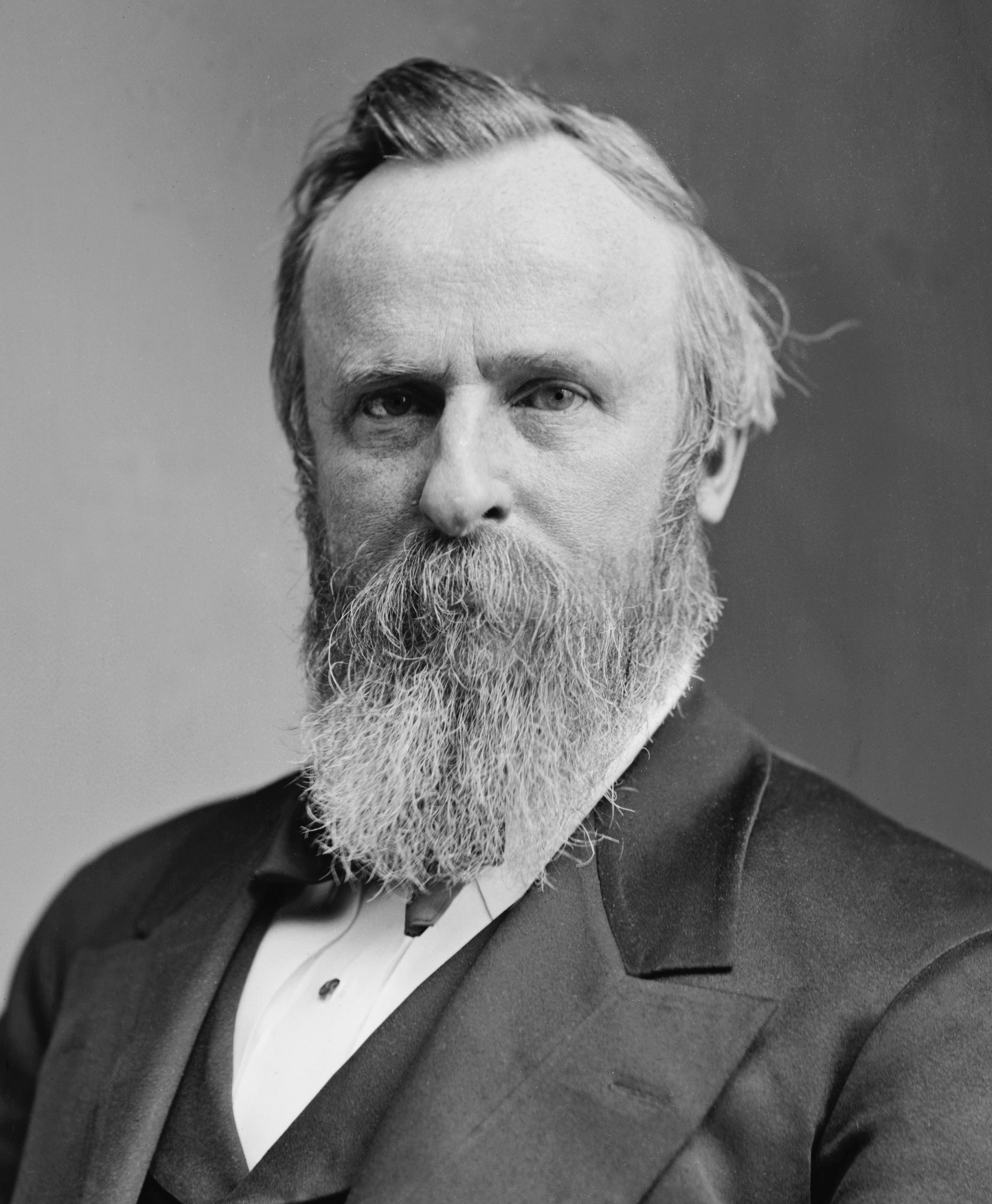
Governor Rutherford B. Hayes of Ohio

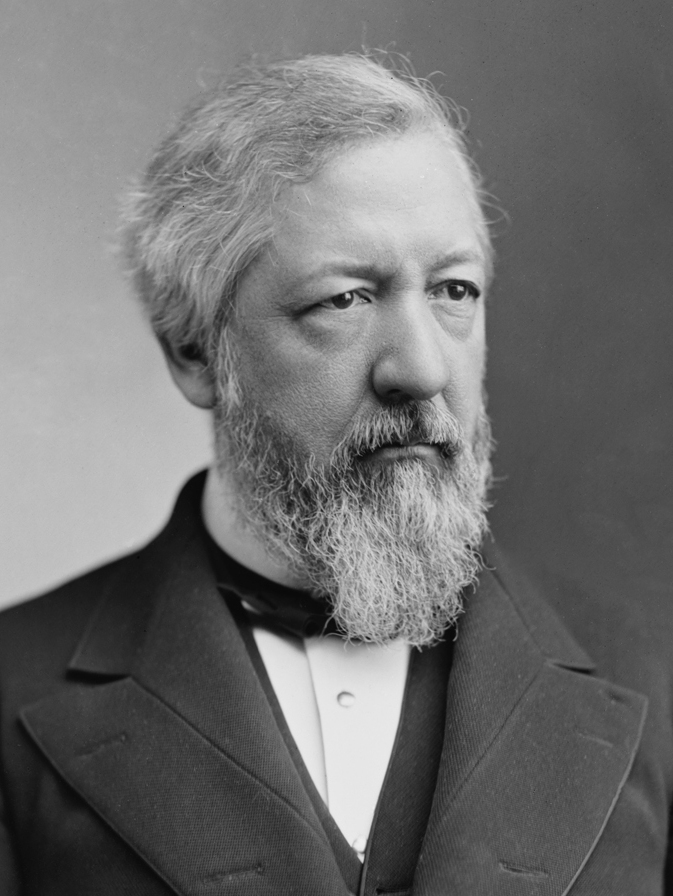
Senator James G. Blaine from Maine

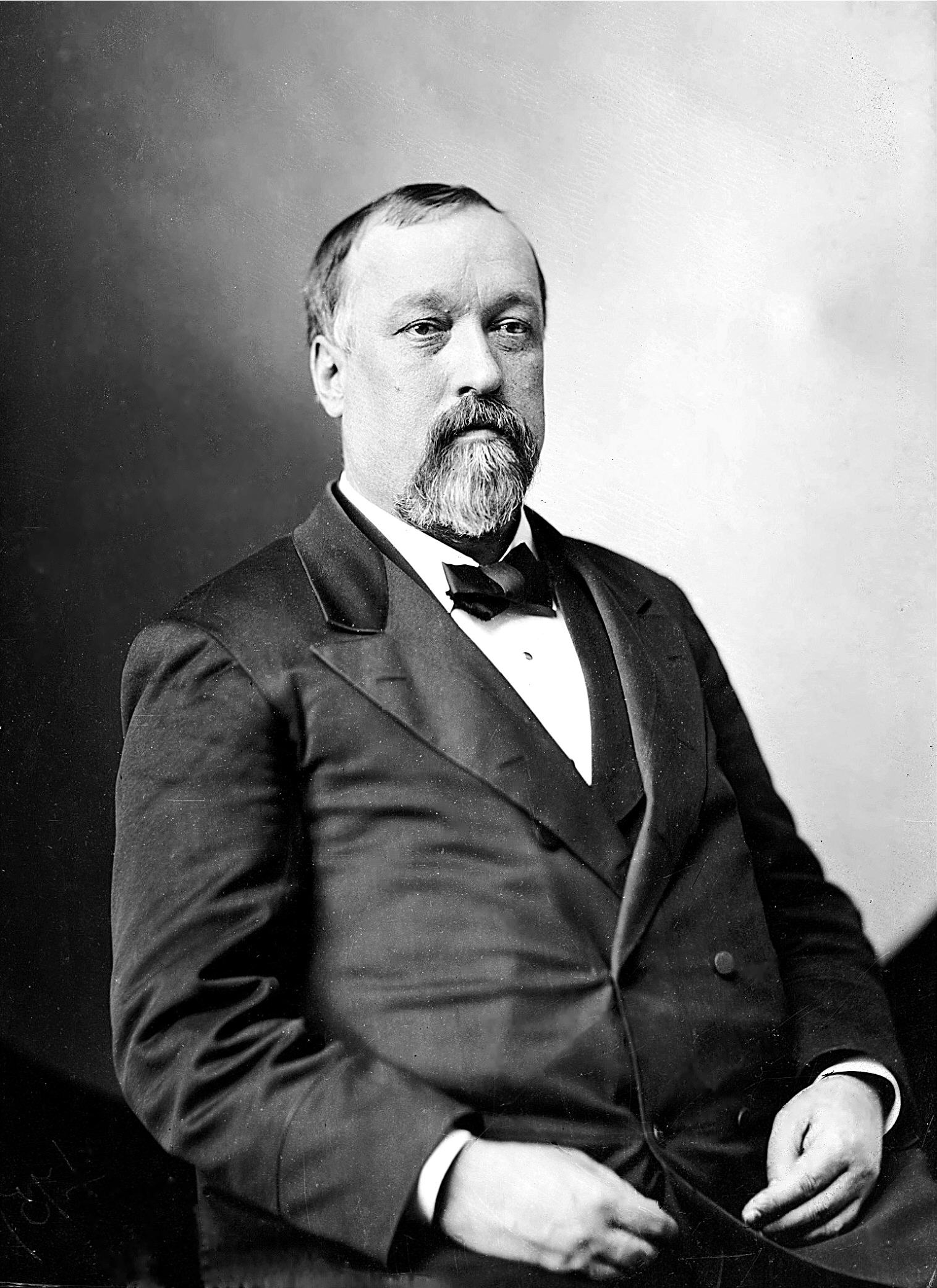
Secretary of the Treasury Benjamin Bristow

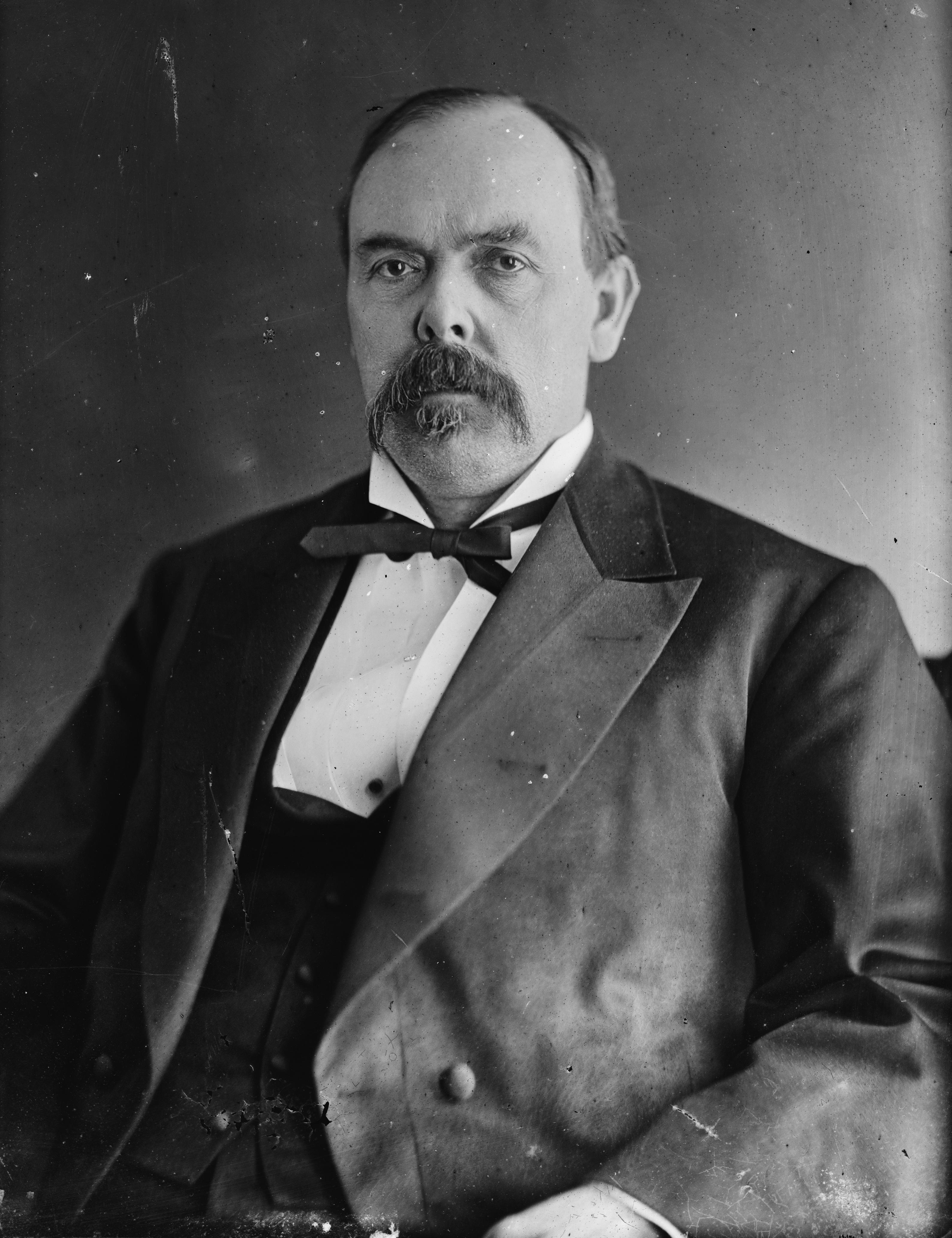
Senator Oliver P. Morton from Indiana

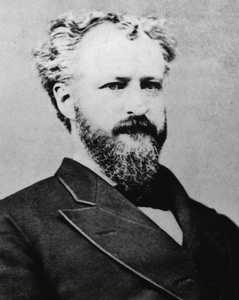
Senator Roscoe Conkling from New York

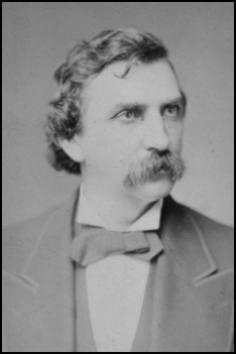
Governor John F. Hartranft of Pennsylvania

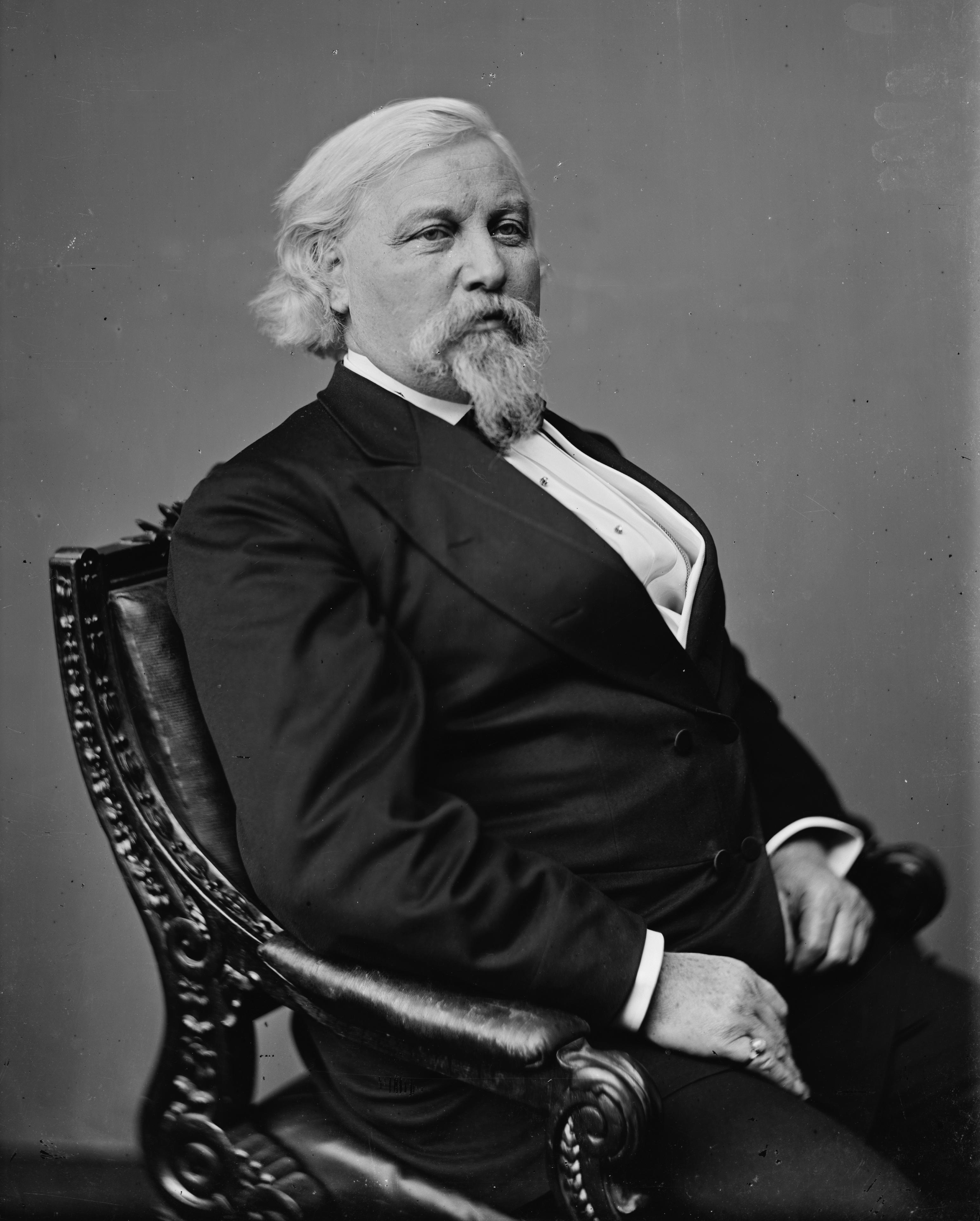
Postmaster General Marshall Jewell

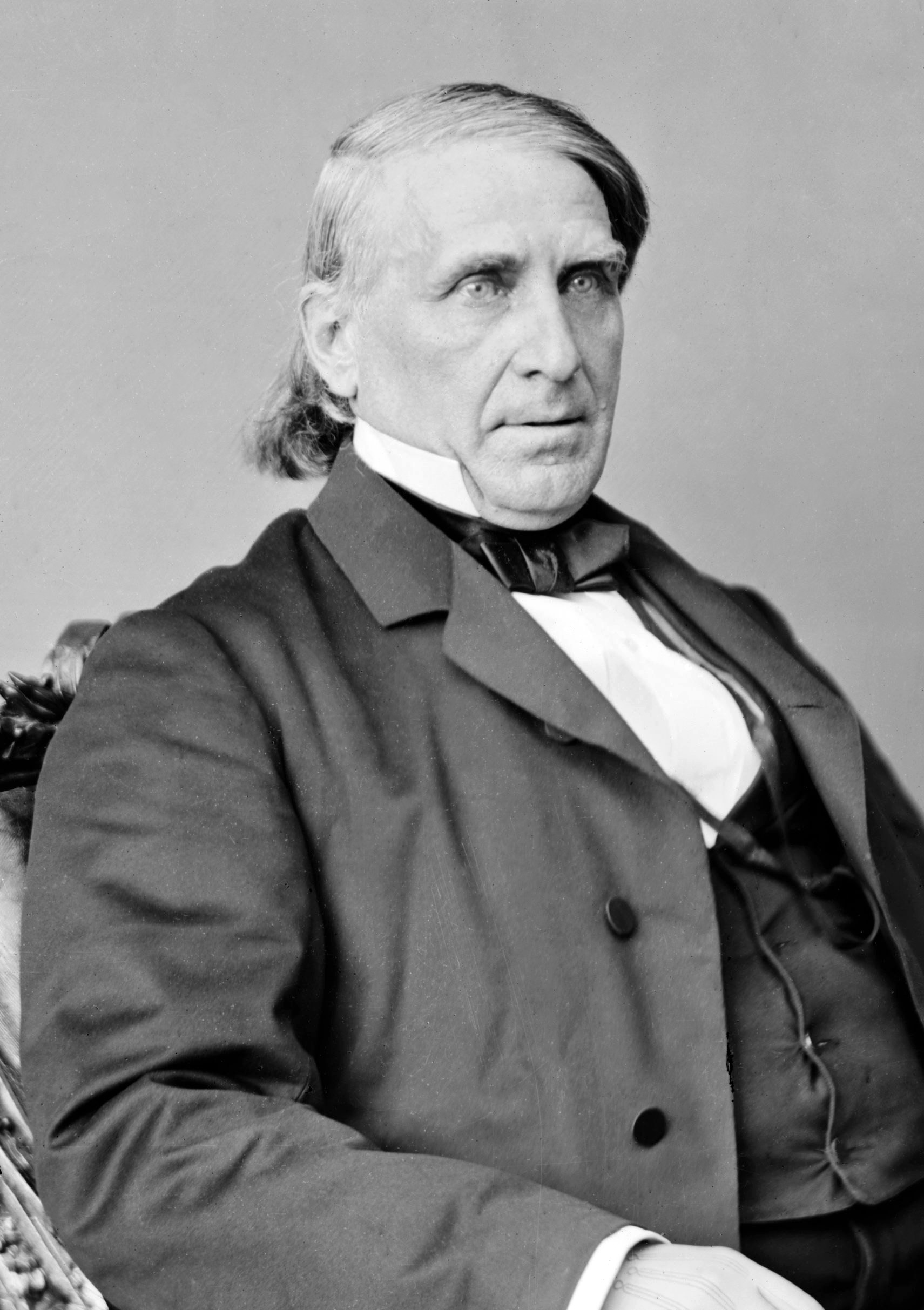
Ambassador Elihu B. Washburne from Illinois

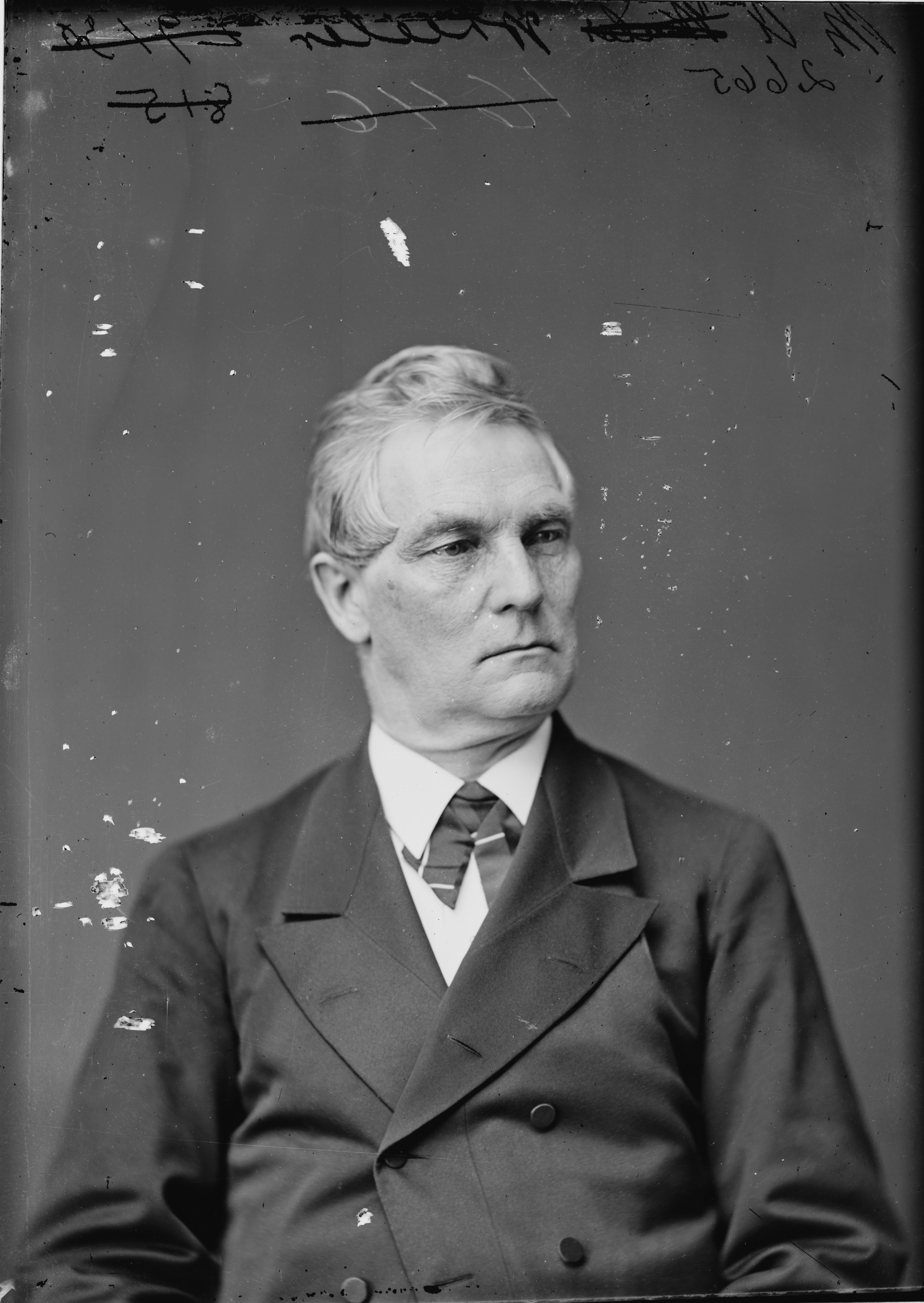
Representative
William A. Wheeler from New York

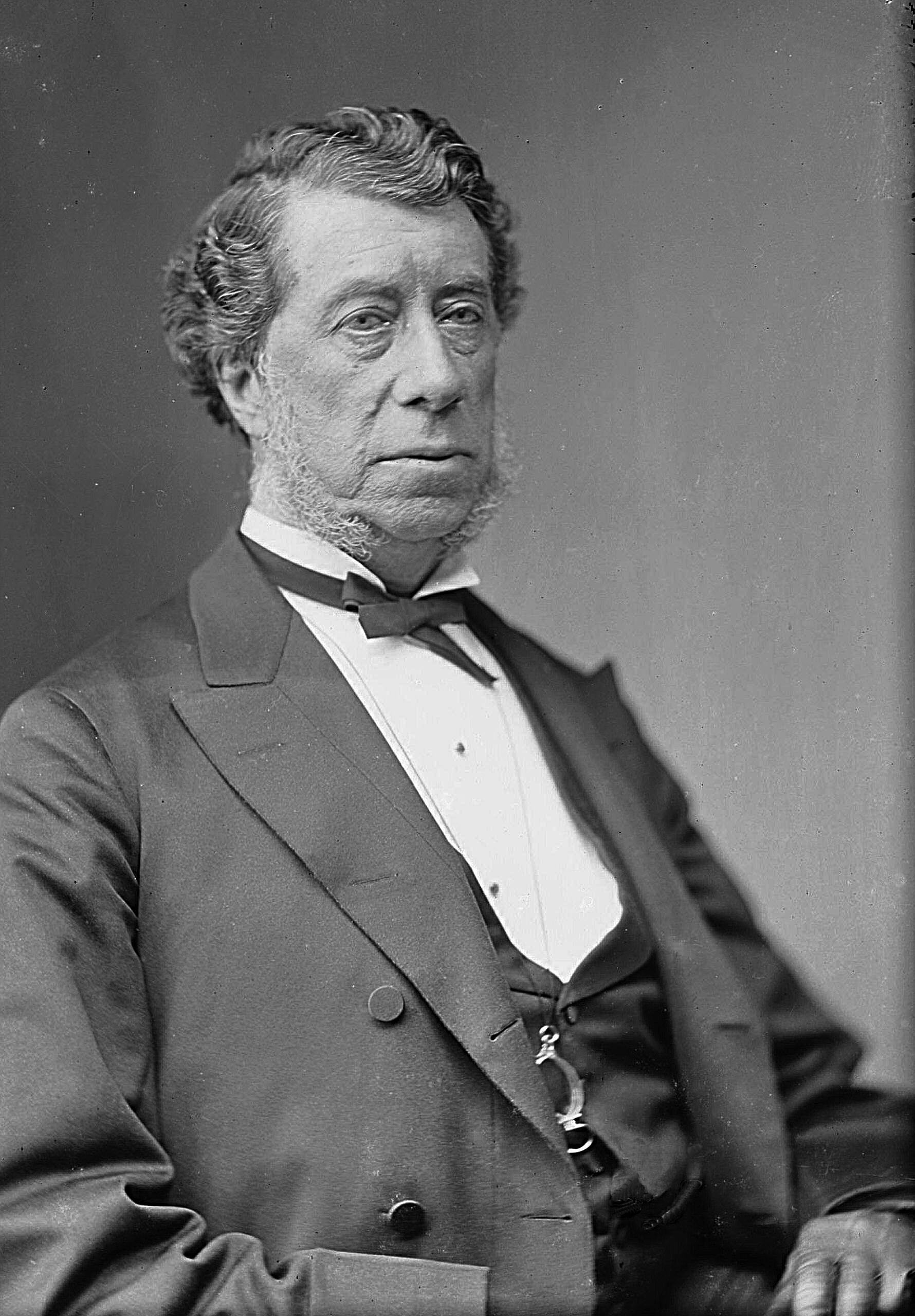
Secretary of State
Hamilton Fish from New York
(declined to run)

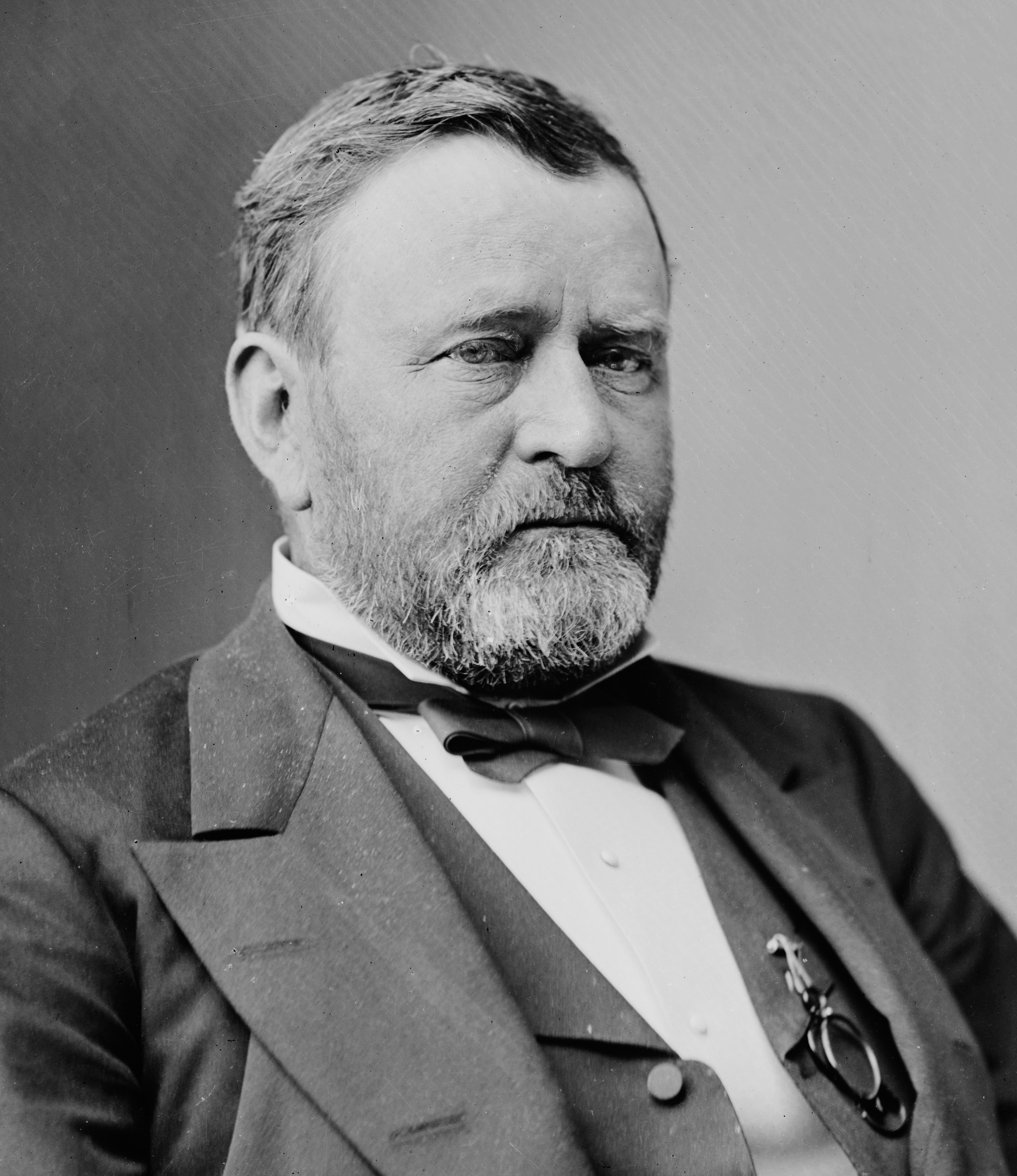
President Ulysses S. Grant
(declined in 1875)

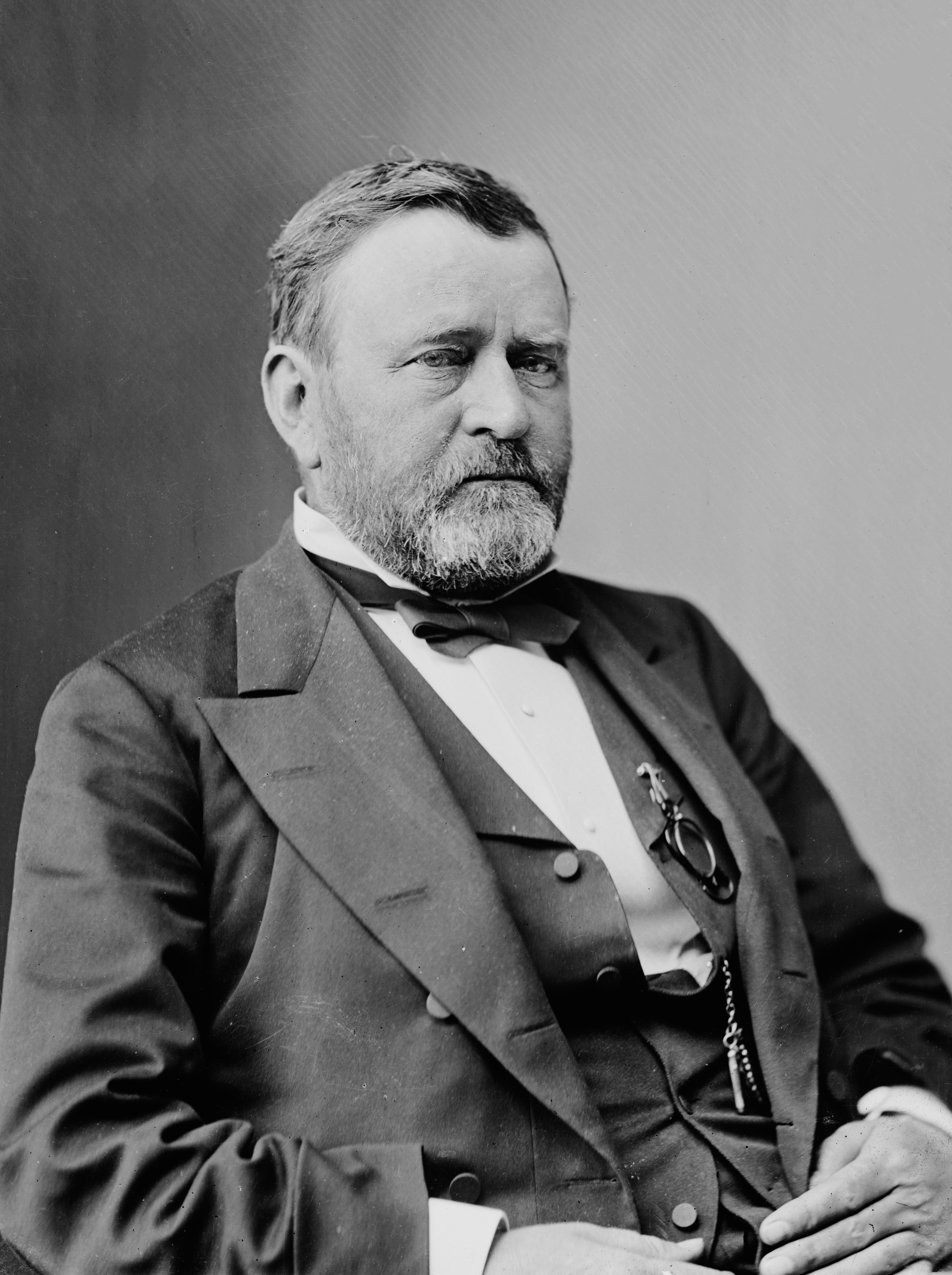
Ulysses S. Grant, the incumbent president in 1876, whose second term expired on March 4, 1877

It was widely assumed during the year 1875 that incumbent President Ulysses S. Grant would run for a third term as president despite the poor economic conditions, the numerous political scandals that had developed since he assumed office in 1869, and despite a longstanding tradition set by George Washington not to stay in office for more than two terms. Grant's inner circle advised him to go for a third term and he almost did so, but on December 15, 1875, the House, by a sweeping 233–18 vote, passed a resolution declaring that the two-term tradition was to prevent a dictatorship. Grant had already ruled himself out of the running in May 1875. He instead tried to persuade Secretary of State Hamilton Fish to run for the presidency, but the 67-year-old Fish declined since he believed himself too old for that role. Grant nonetheless sent a letter to the convention imploring them to nominate Fish, but the letter was misplaced and never read to the convention. Fish later confirmed that he would have declined the presidential nomination even if it had been offered to him.

When the Sixth Republican National Convention assembled in Cincinnati, Ohio, on June 14, 1876, James G. Blaine appeared to be the presidential nominee. On the first ballot, Blaine was just 100 votes short of a majority. His vote began to slide after the second ballot, however, as many Republicans feared that Blaine could not win the general election. Anti-Blaine delegates could not agree on a candidate until his total rose to 41% on the sixth ballot. Leaders of the reform Republicans met privately and considered alternatives. They chose the reforming Ohio Governor Rutherford B. Hayes, who had been gradually building support during the convention until he finished second on the sixth ballot. On the seventh ballot, Hayes was nominated for president with 384 votes, compared to 351 for Blaine and 21 for Benjamin Bristow. New York Representative William A. Wheeler was nominated for vice president by a much larger margin (366–89) over his chief rival, Frederick Theodore Frelinghuysen, who later served as a member of the Electoral Commission, which awarded the election to Hayes.

Presidential Ballot
Ballot	1st	2nd	3rd	4th	5th	6th	7th
Hayes	61	64	67	68	104	113	384
Blaine	285	296	293	292	286	308	351
Bristow	113	114	121	126	114	111	21
Morton	124	120	113	108	95	85	0
Conkling	99	93	90	84	82	81	0
Hartranft	58	63	68	71	69	50	0
Jewell	11	0	0	0	0	0	0
Washburne	0	1	1	3	3	4	0
Wheeler	3	3	2	2	2	2	0
Not Voting	2	2	1	2	1	2	0

Republican Presidential Nomination Vote by State Delegation By Ballot
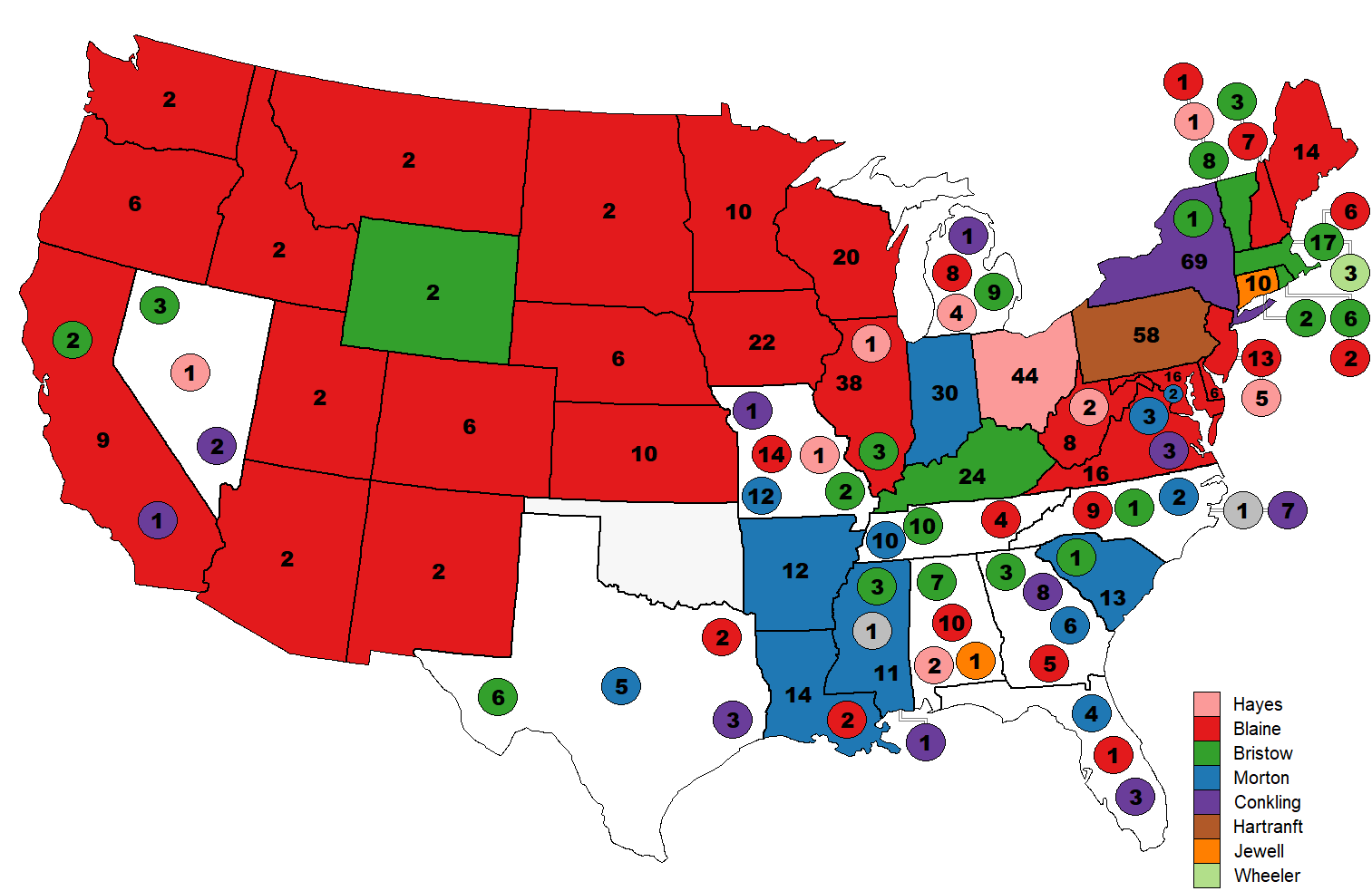
1st Presidential Ballot

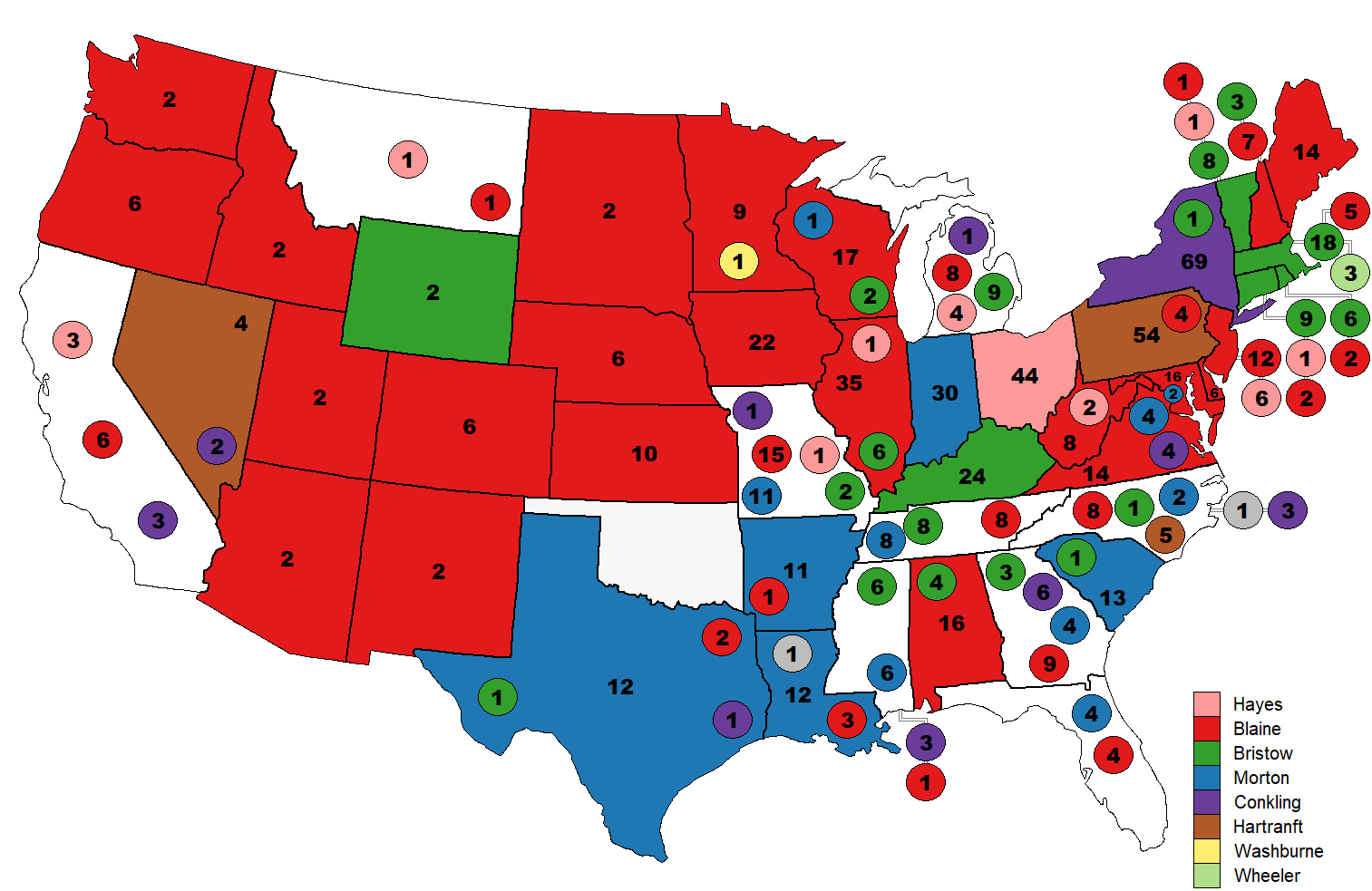
2nd Presidential Ballot

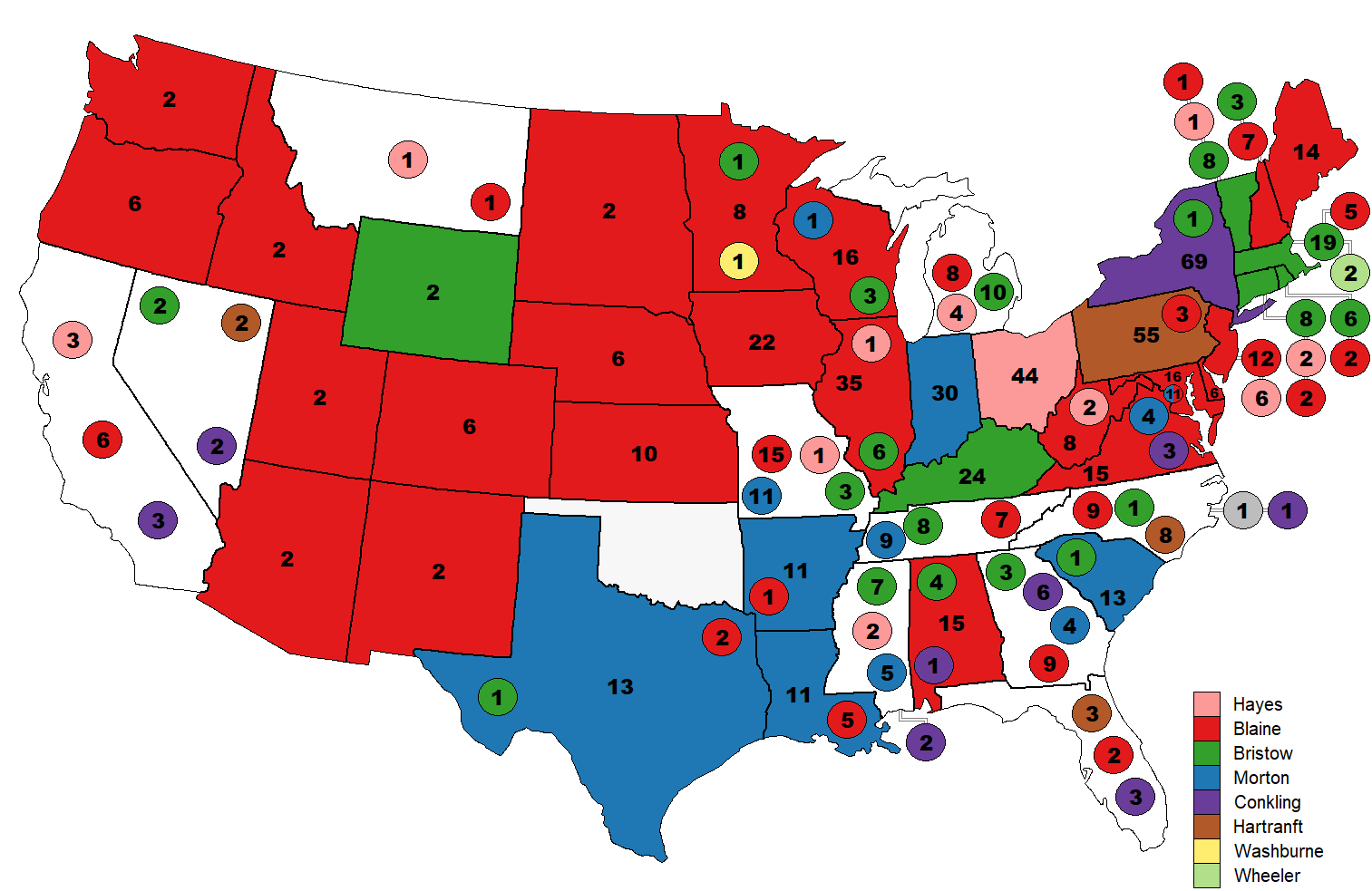
3rd Presidential Ballot

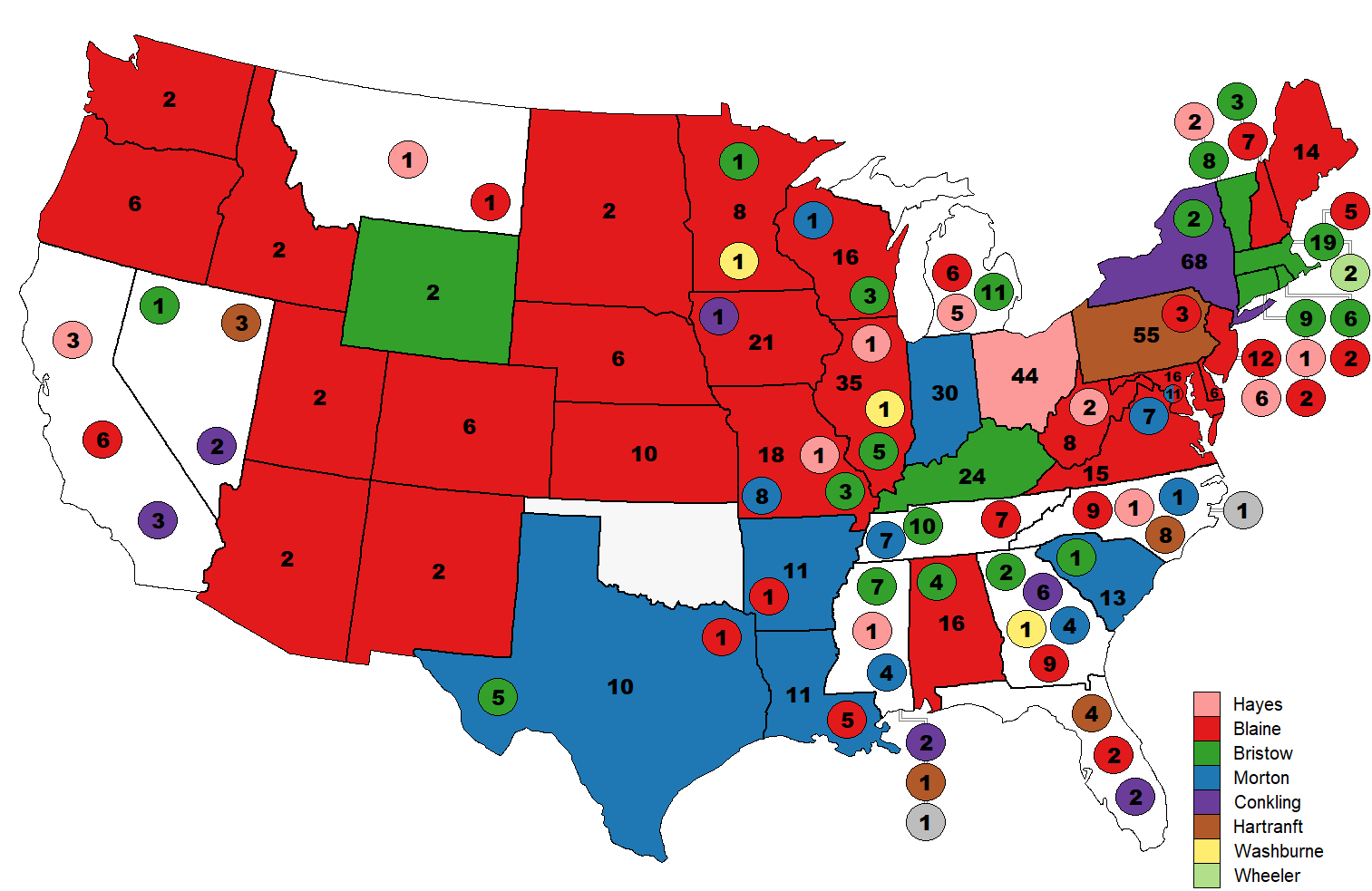
4th Presidential Ballot

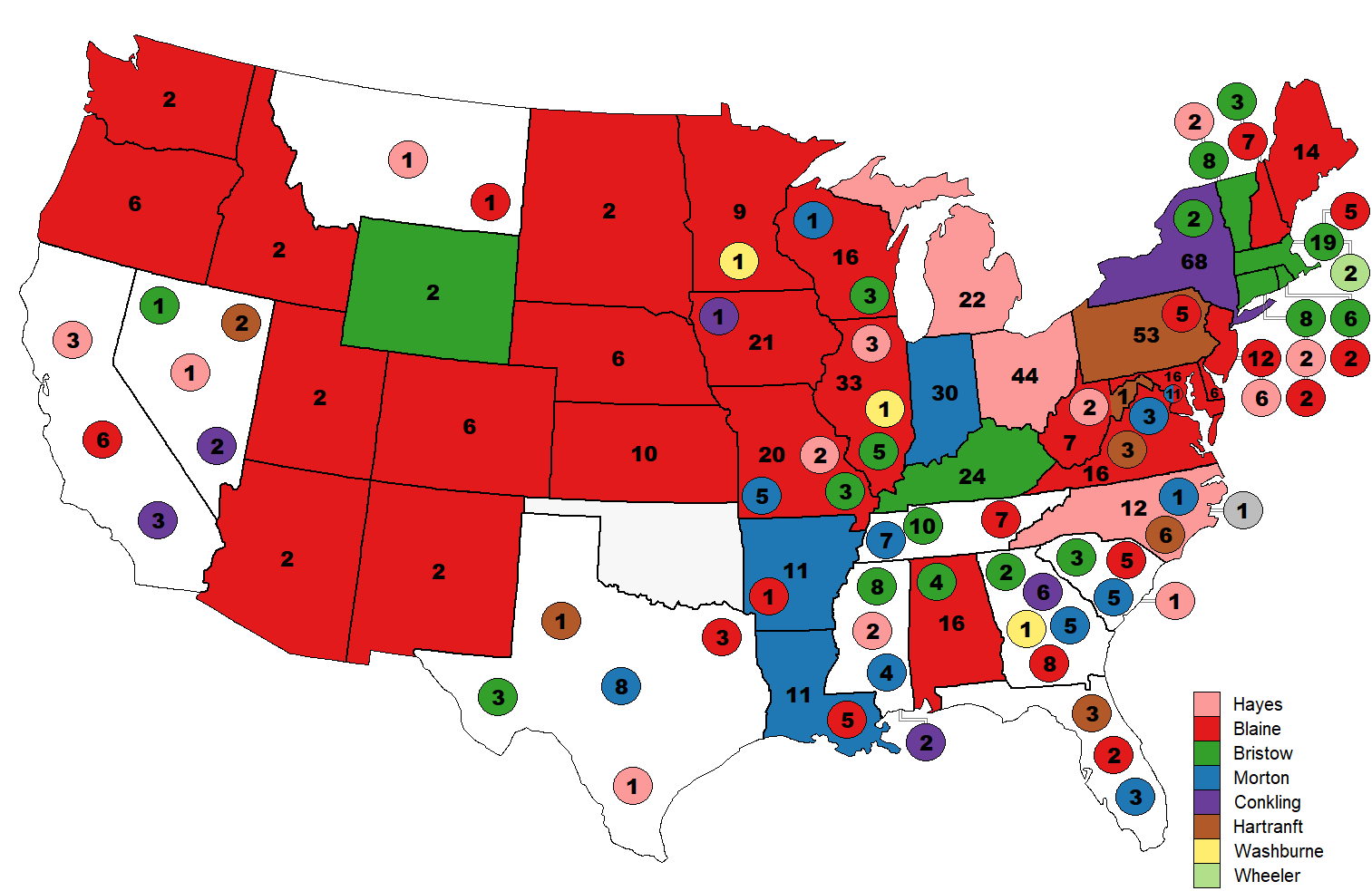
5th Presidential Ballot

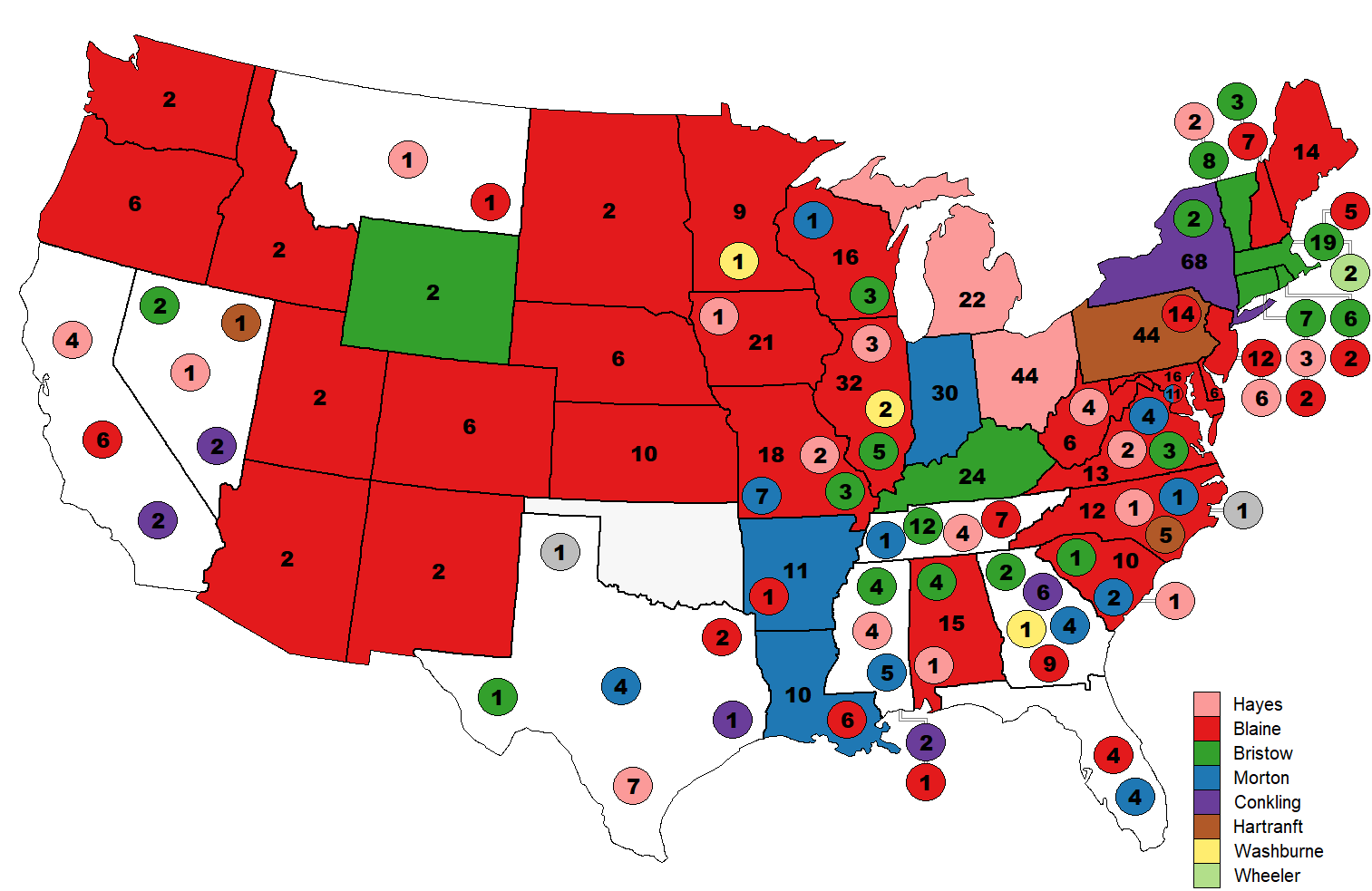
6th Presidential Ballot

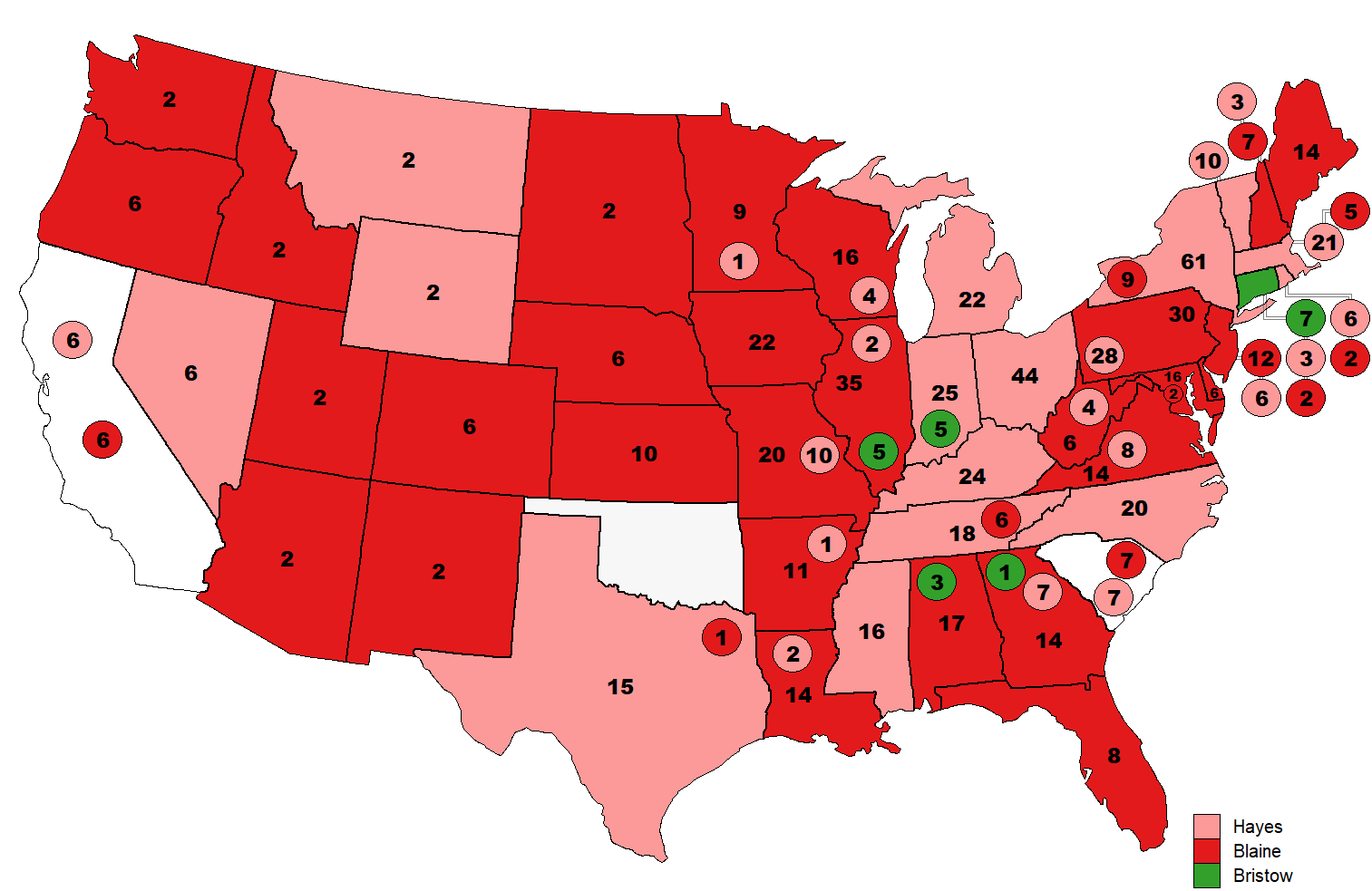
7th Presidential Ballot

Vice Presidential Ballot
Ballot	1st (Partial Roll-Call)
Wheeler	366
Frelinghuysen	89
Jewell	86
Woodford	70
Hawley	25
Not Called	120

Republican Vice Presidential Nomination Vote by State Delegation
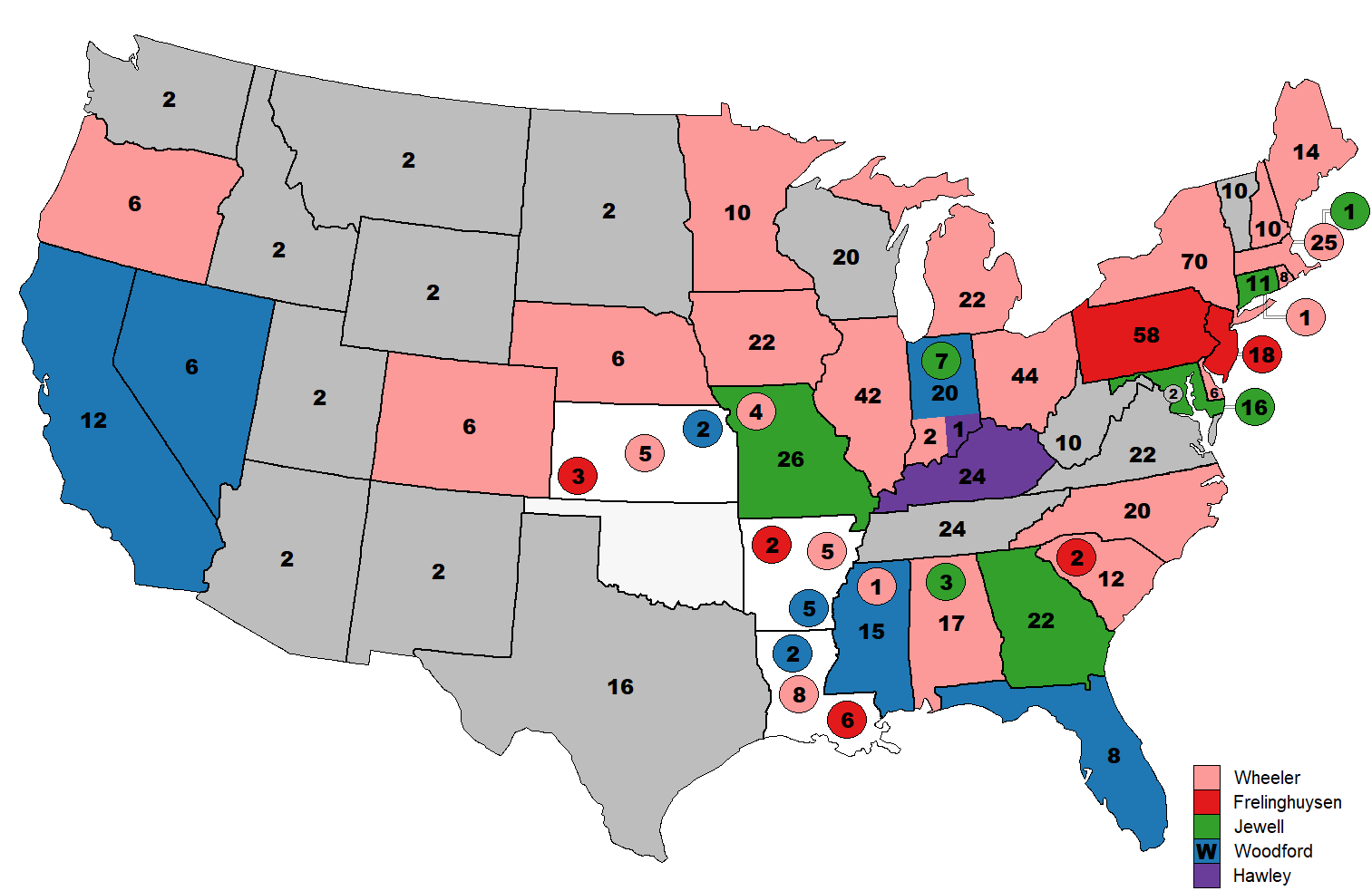
1st Vice Presidential Ballot
(Partial)

=== Democratic Party nomination ===
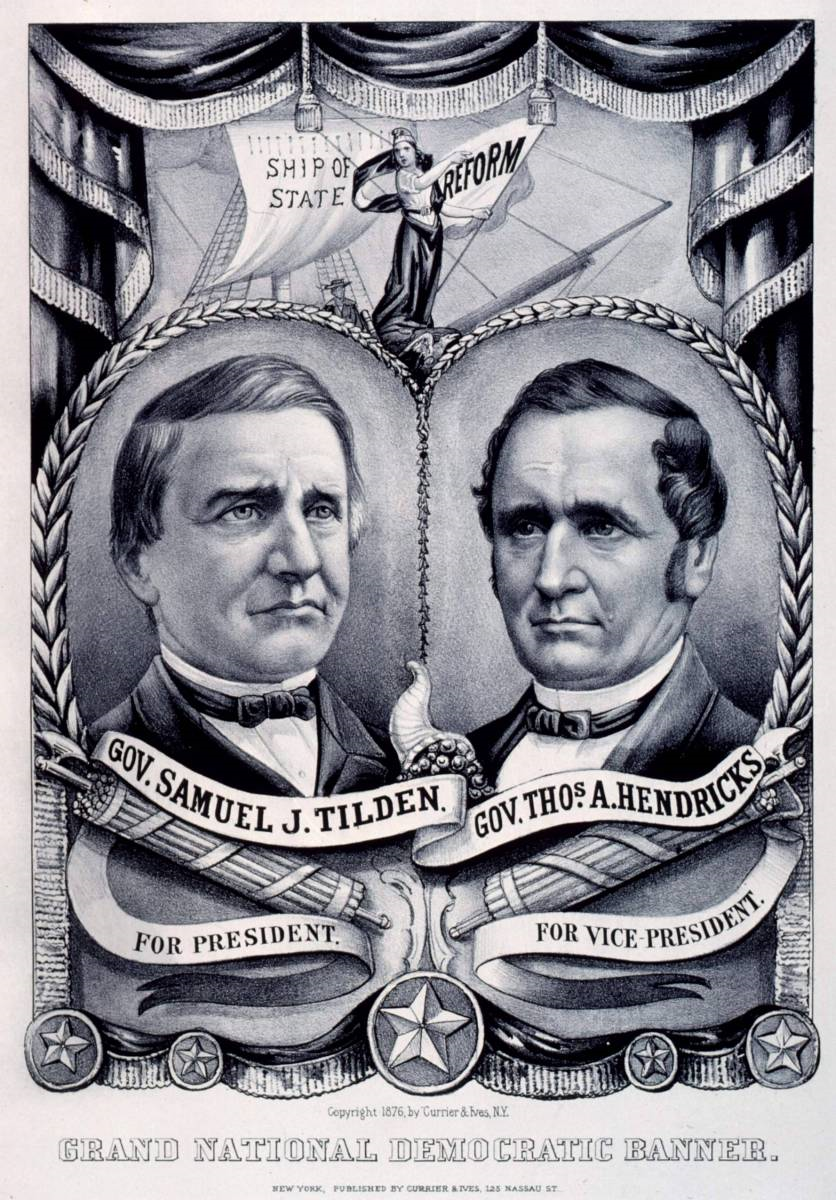
Tilden/Hendricks campaign poster

Democratic Party (United States) 1876 Democratic Party ticket
Samuel J. Tilden	Thomas A. Hendricks
for President	for Vice President
25th Governor of New York (1875–1876)	16th Governor of Indiana (1873–1877)
Campaign

Democratic candidates:

- Samuel J. Tilden, governor of New York
- Thomas A. Hendricks, governor of Indiana
- Winfield Scott Hancock, United States Army major general from Pennsylvania
- William Allen, former governor of Ohio
- Thomas F. Bayard, U.S. senator from Delaware
- Joel Parker, former governor of New Jersey
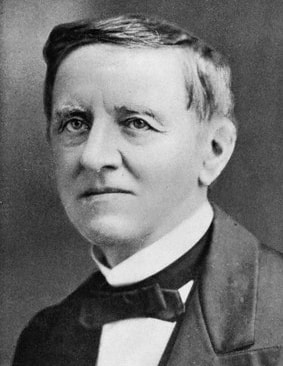
Governor Samuel J. Tilden of New York

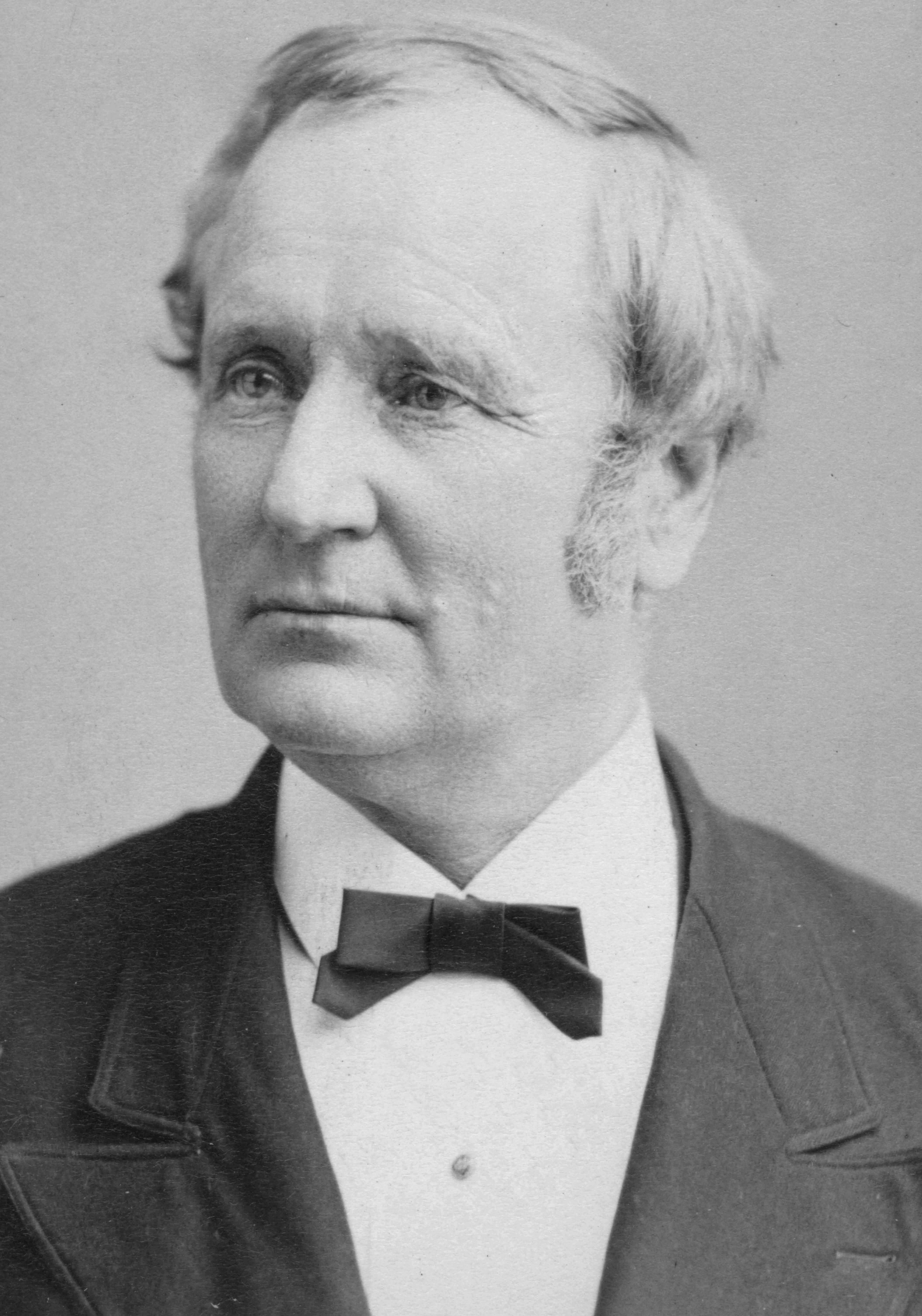
Governor Thomas A. Hendricks of Indiana

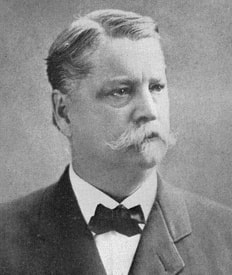
Major General Winfield Scott Hancock from Pennsylvania

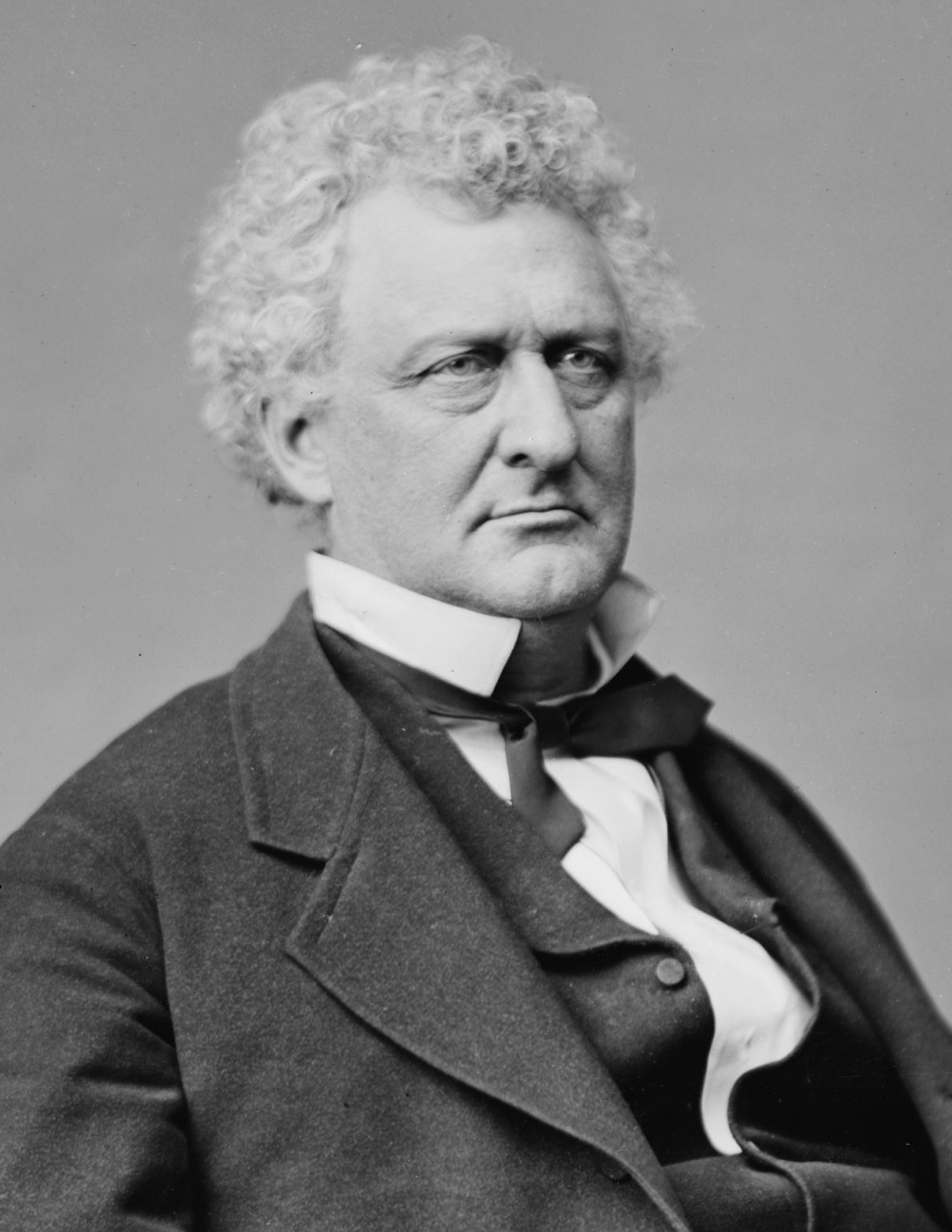
William Allen from Ohio

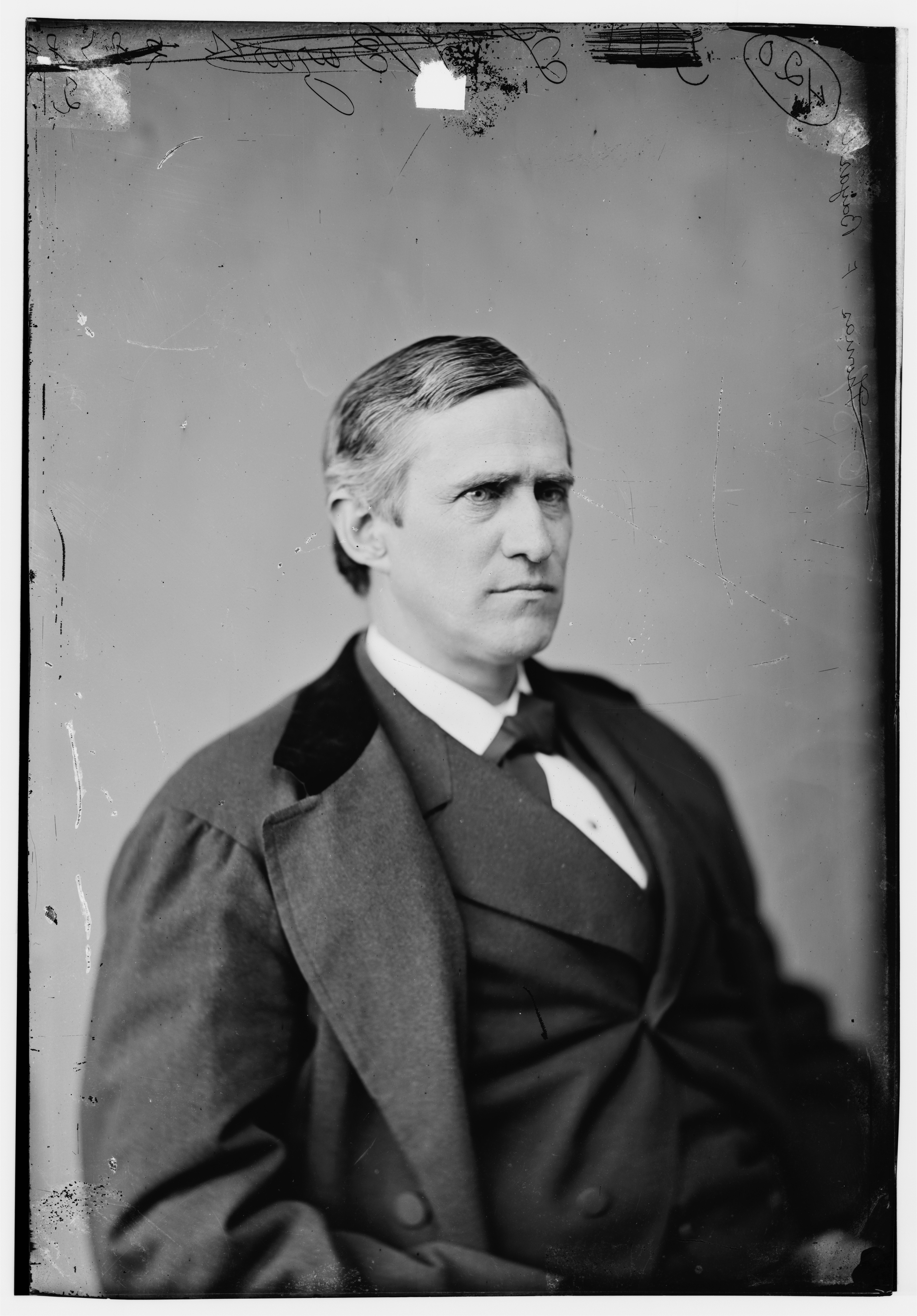
Senator Thomas F. Bayard from Delaware

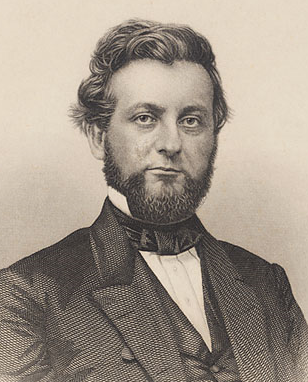
Joel Parker from New Jersey

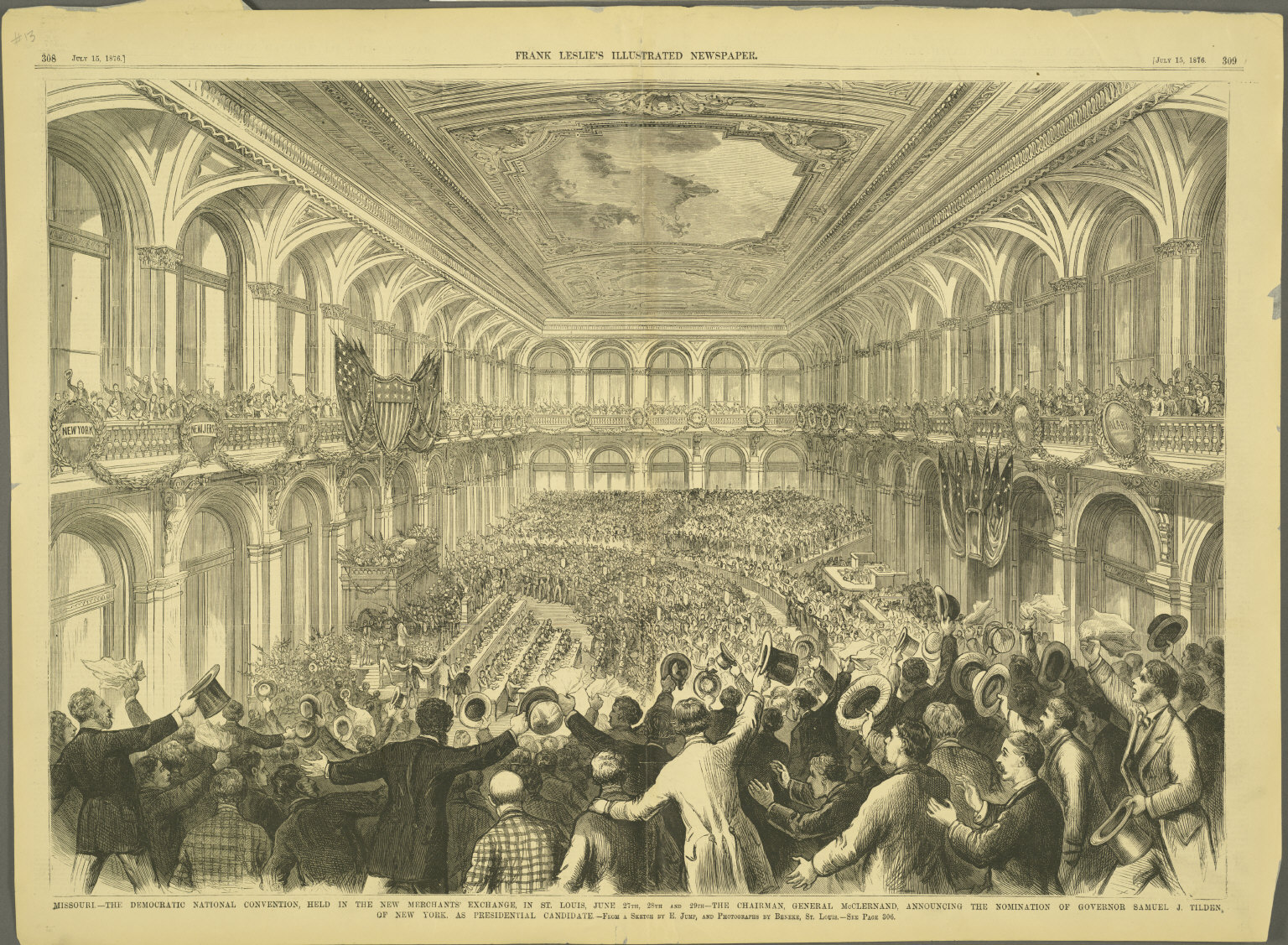
Interior of the Merchants Exchange Building of St. Louis, Missouri, during the announcement of Samuel J. Tilden as the Democratic presidential nominee

The Democratic Party's failure to nominate its own ticket in the previous presidential election, in which they had instead endorsed the Liberal Republican candidacy of Horace Greeley, had resulted in much debate about the party's viability. Any doubts about the party's future were dispelled firstly by the collapse of the Liberal Republicans in the aftermath of that election, and secondly by significant Democratic gains in the 1874 mid-term elections, which saw them take control of the House of Representatives for the first time in sixteen years.

The 12th Democratic National Convention assembled in St. Louis, Missouri, in June 1876, which was the first political convention ever held by one of the major American parties west of the Mississippi River. There were 5000 people jammed inside the auditorium in St. Louis amid hopes for the Democratic Party's first presidential victory in 20 years. The platform called for immediate and sweeping reforms in response to the scandals that had plagued the Grant administration. Tilden won more than 400 votes on the first ballot and the presidential nomination by a landslide on the second.

Tilden defeated Thomas A. Hendricks, Winfield Scott Hancock, William Allen, Thomas F. Bayard, and Joel Parker for the presidential nomination. Tilden overcame strong opposition from "Honest John" Kelly, the leader of New York's Tammany Hall, to obtain the presidential nomination. Thomas Hendricks was nominated for vice president since he was the only person to put forward for that position.

The Democratic platform pledged to replace the corruption of the Grant administration with honest, efficient government and to end "the rapacity of carpetbag tyrannies" in the South. It also called for treaty protection for naturalized United States citizens visiting their homelands, restrictions on Asian immigration, tariff reform, and opposition to land grants for railroads. It has been claimed that the voting Democrats received Tilden's presidential nomination with more enthusiasm than any leader since Andrew Jackson.

Presidential Ballot
	1st (Before Shifts)	1st (After Shifts)	2nd (Before Shifts)	2nd (After Shifts)	Unanimous
Tilden	403.5	410.5	508	534	738
Hendricks	133.5	140.5	85	60	0
Hancock	77	77	60	59	0
Allen	56	56	54	54	0
Bayard	31	31	11	11	0
Broadhead	19	5	0	0	0
Parker	18	18	18	18	0
Thurman	0	0	2	2	0

Source: Official proceedings of the National Democratic convention, held in St. Louis, Mo., June 27th, 28th and 29th, 1876. (September 3, 2012).

Democratic Presidential Nomination Vote by State Delegation By Ballot
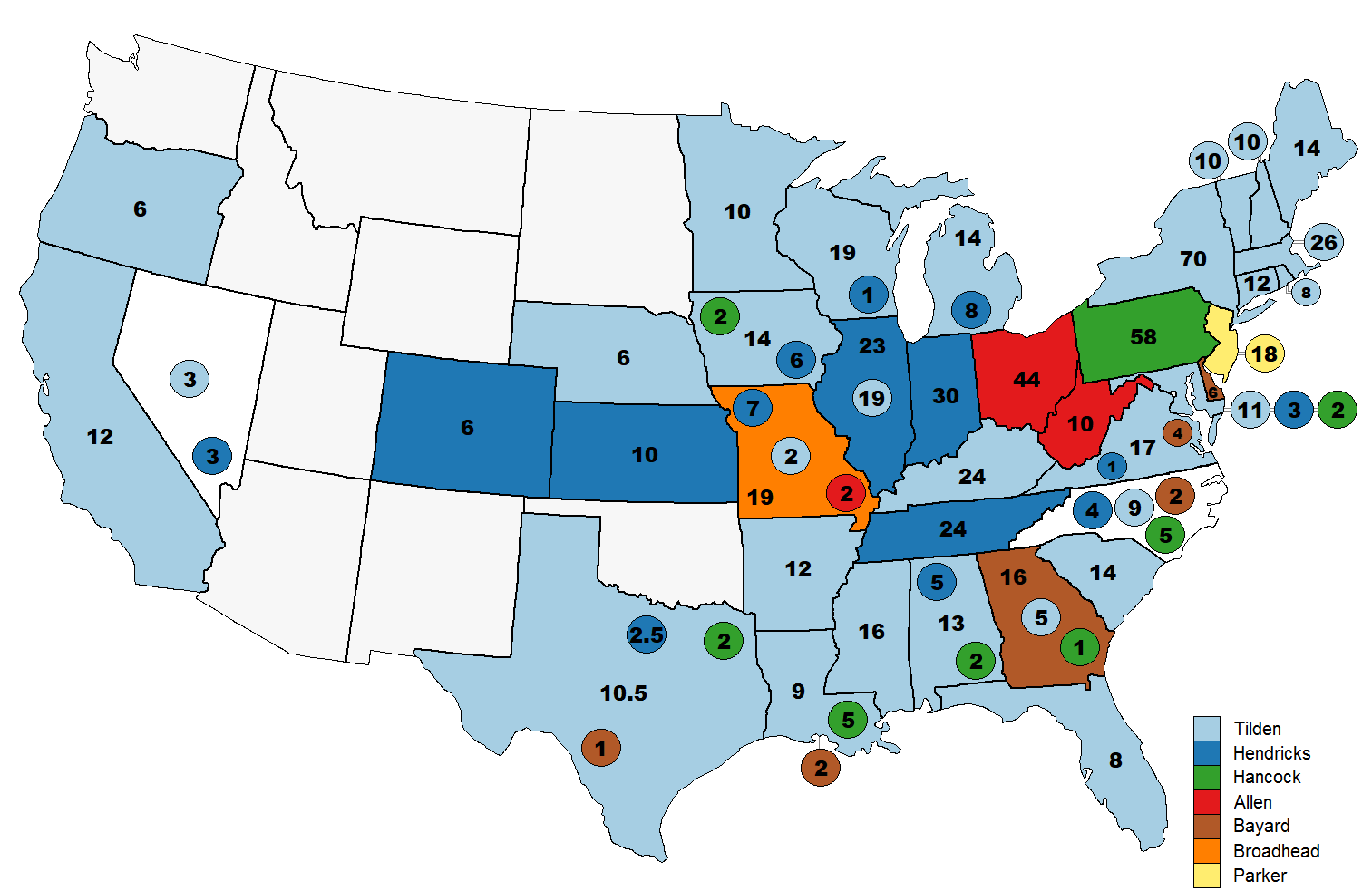
1st Presidential Ballot
Before Shifts

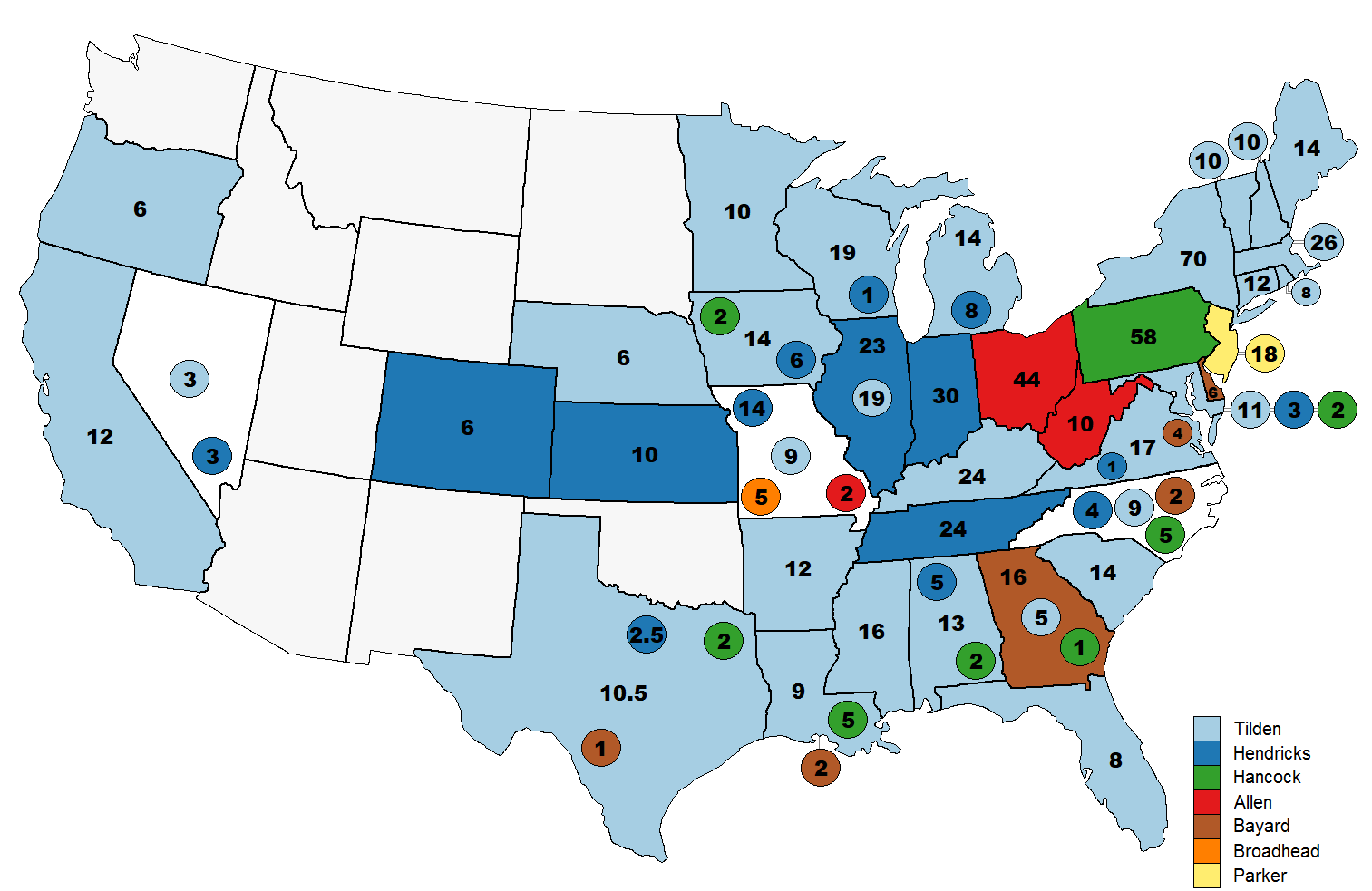
1st Presidential Ballot
After Shifts

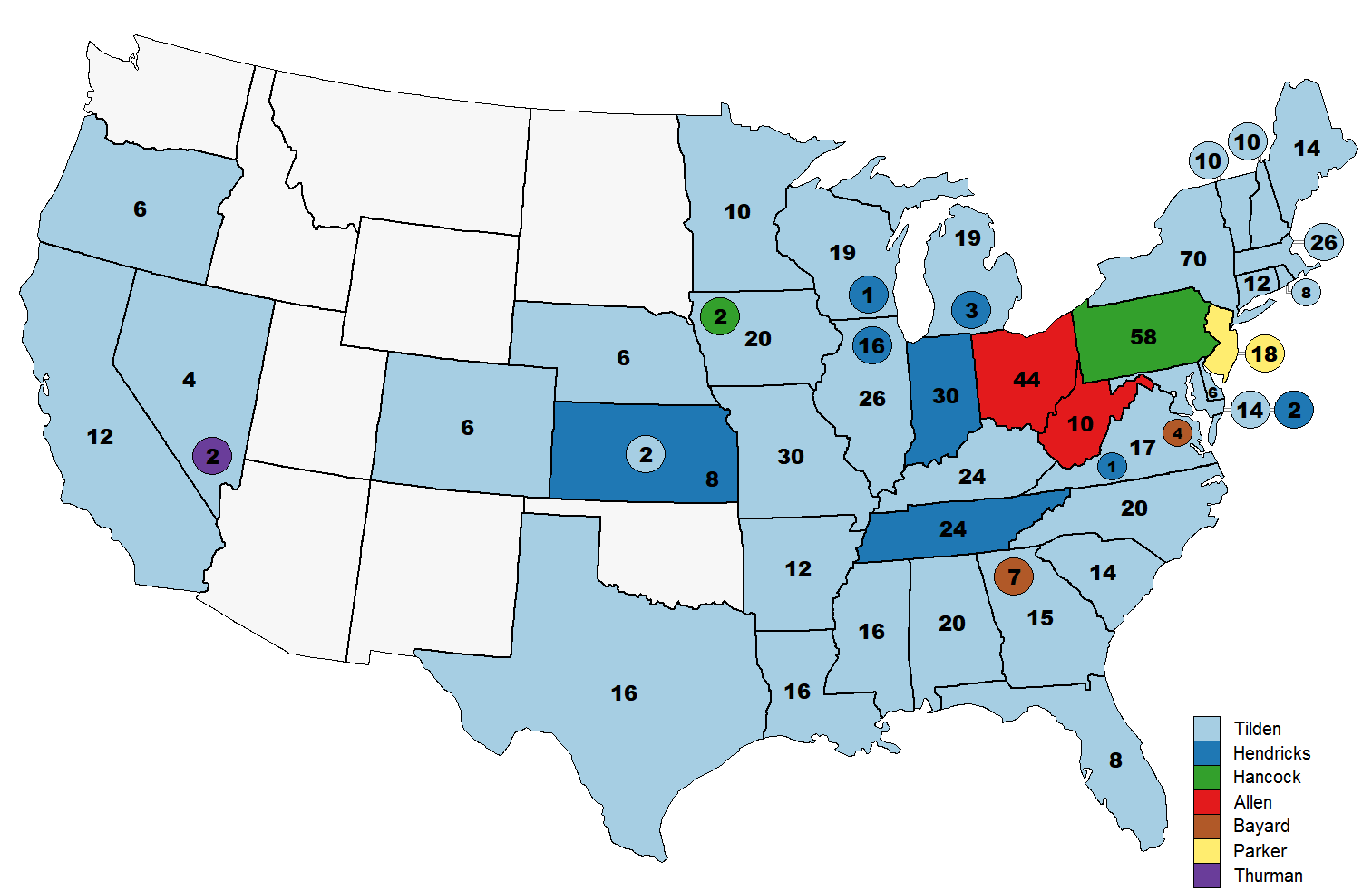
2nd Presidential Ballot
Before Shifts

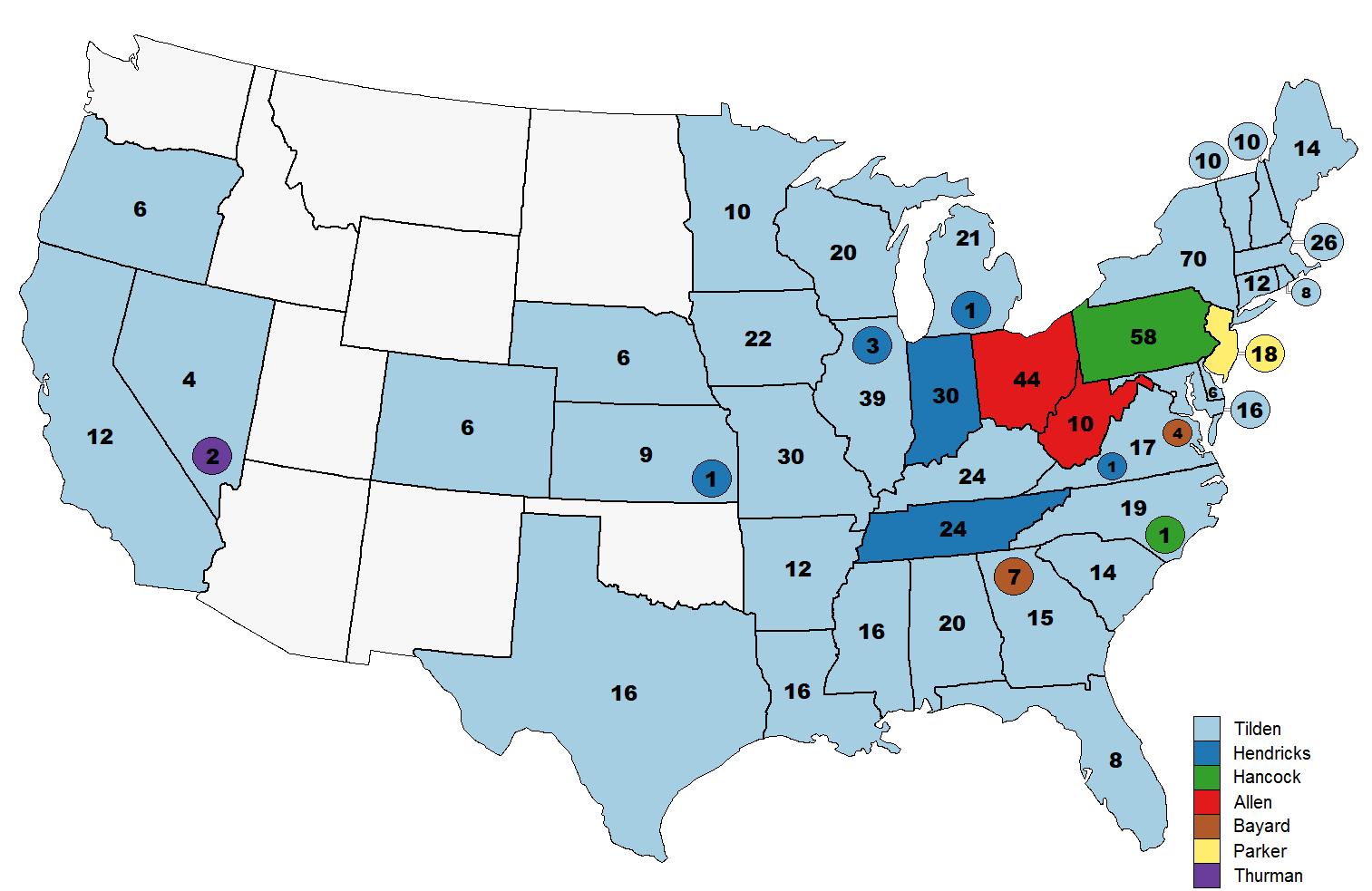
2nd Presidential Ballot
After Shifts

Source: Official proceedings of the National Democratic convention, held in St. Louis, Mo., June 27th, 28th and 29th, 1876. (September 3, 2012).

Vice Presidential Ballot
	1st
Thomas A. Hendricks	730
Blank	8

Source: Official proceedings of the National Democratic convention, held in St. Louis, Mo., June 27th, 28th and 29th, 1876 (September 3, 2012).

=== Greenback Party nomination ===
Greenback candidates:

- Peter Cooper, U.S. philanthropist from New York
- Andrew Curtin, former governor of Pennsylvania
- William Allen, former governor of Ohio
- Alexander Campbell, U.S. representative from Illinois

==== Candidates gallery ====
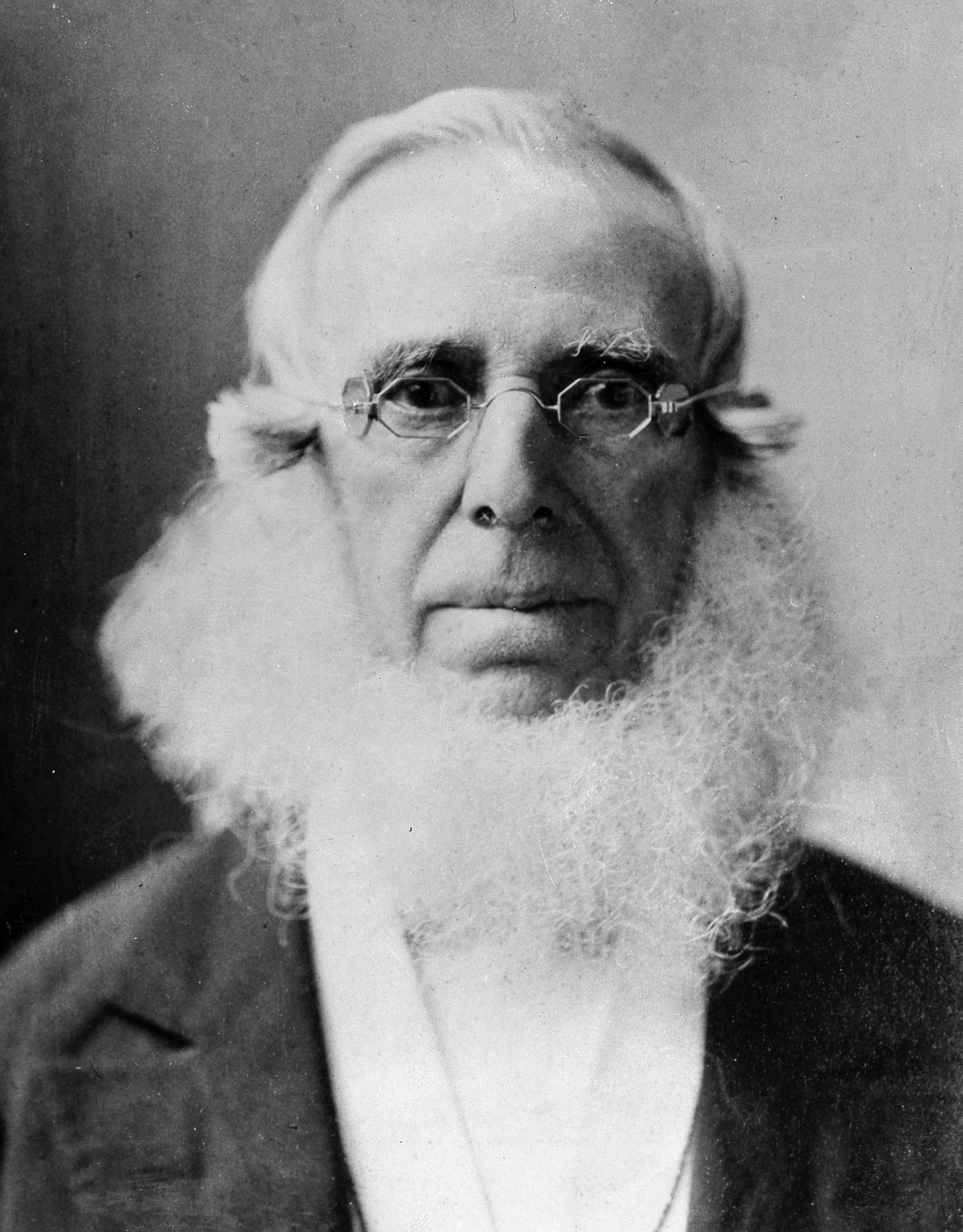
Philanthropist Peter Cooper from New York

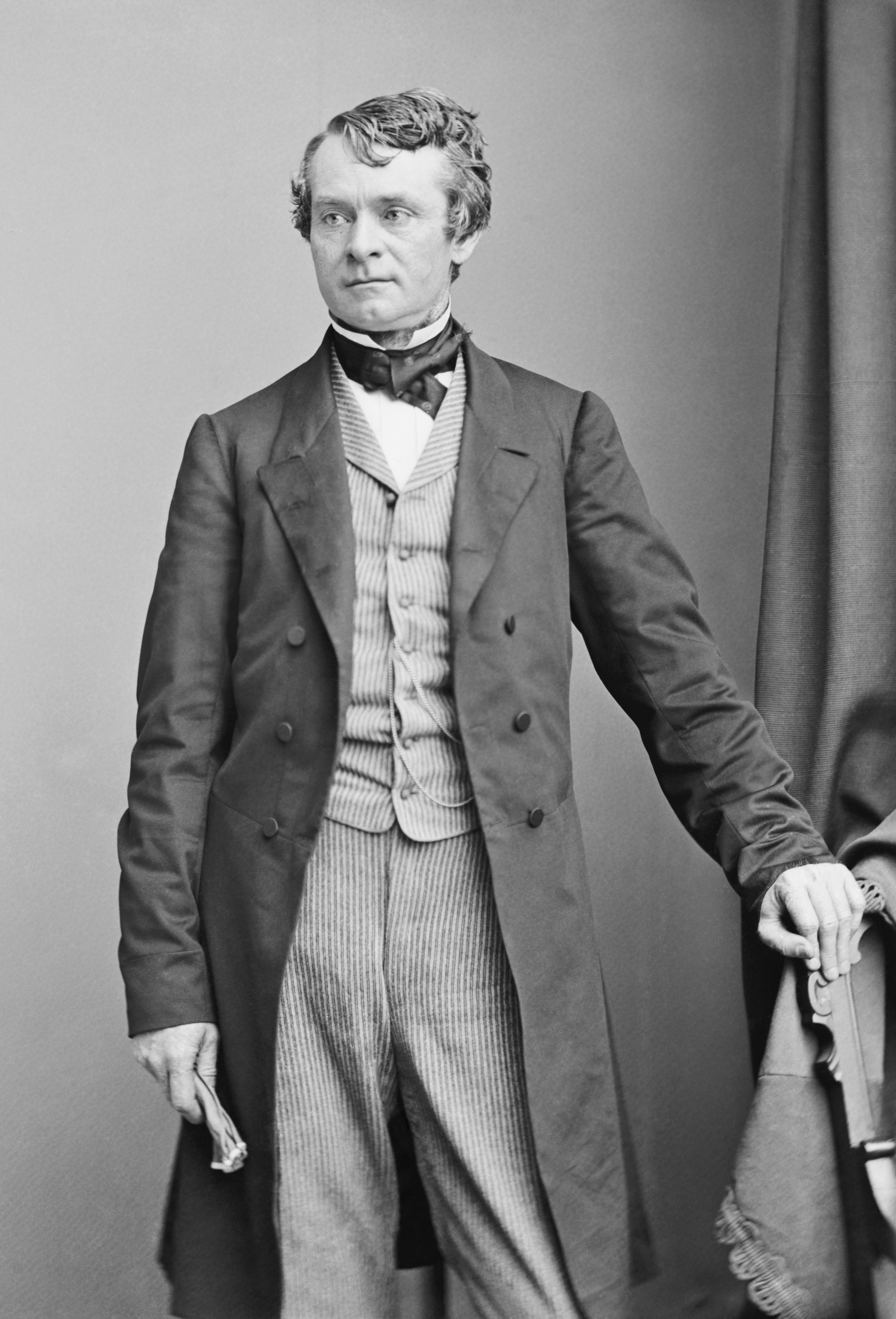
Andrew Curtin from Pennsylvania

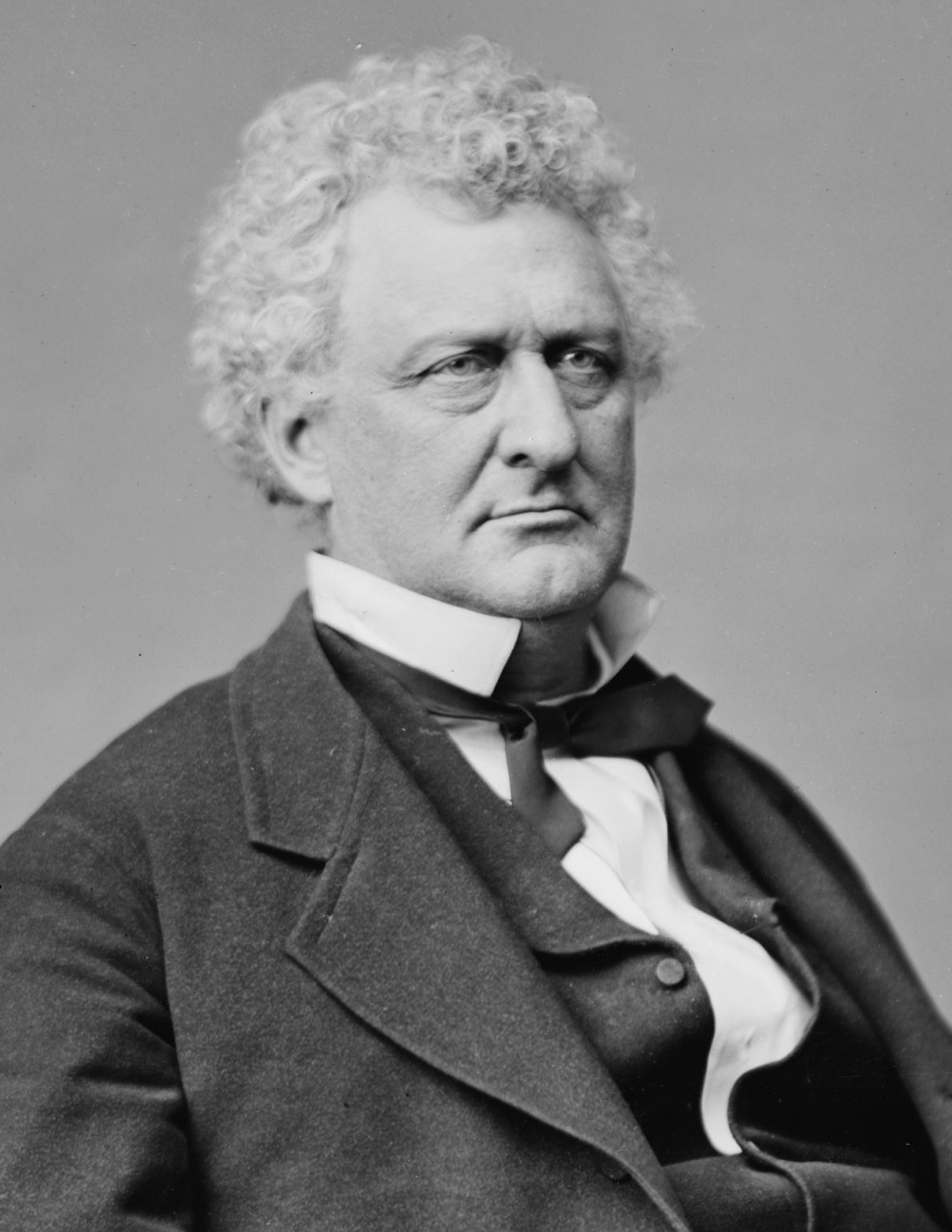
William Allen from Ohio

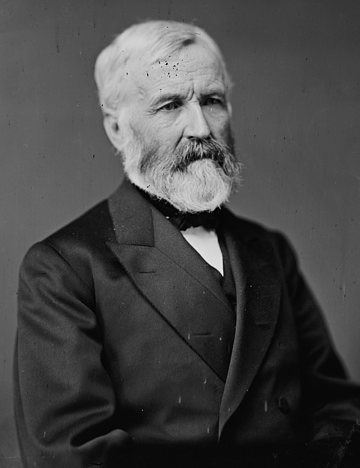
Alexander Campbell from Illinois

The Greenback Party had been organized by agricultural interests in Indianapolis, Indiana, in 1874 to urge the federal government to inflate the economy through the mass issuance of paper money called greenbacks. Its first national nominating convention was held in Indianapolis during the month of May 1876. Peter Cooper was nominated for president with 352 votes to 119 for three other candidates. The convention nominated Anti-Monopolist Senator Newton Booth of California for vice president. After Booth declined to run, the national committee chose Samuel Fenton Cary as his replacement on the ticket.

=== Prohibition Party nomination ===
The Prohibition Party, in its second national convention in Cleveland, nominated Green Clay Smith as its presidential candidate and Gideon T. Stewart as its vice presidential candidate.

=== American National Party nomination ===
This small political party used several different names, often with different names in different states. It was a continuation of the Anti-Masonic Party that met in 1872 and nominated Charles Francis Adams Sr., for president. When Adams declined to run, the party did not contest the 1872 election.

The convention was held from June 8 to 10, 1875 in Liberty Hall, Pittsburgh, Pennsylvania. B.T. Roberts of New York served as chairman, and Jonathan Blanchard was the keynote speaker.

The platform supported the Reconstruction Amendments to the Constitution, international arbitration, the reading of the scriptures in public schools, specie payments, justice for Native Americans, abolition of the Electoral College, and prohibition of the sale of alcoholic beverages. It declared the first day of the week to be a day of rest for the United States. The platform opposed secret societies and monopolies.

The convention considered three potential presidential candidates: Charles F. Adams, Jonathan Blanchard, and James B. Walker. When Blanchard declined to run, Walker was unanimously nominated for president. The convention then nominated Donald Kirkpatrick of New York unanimously for vice president.

== General election ==
=== Campaign ===
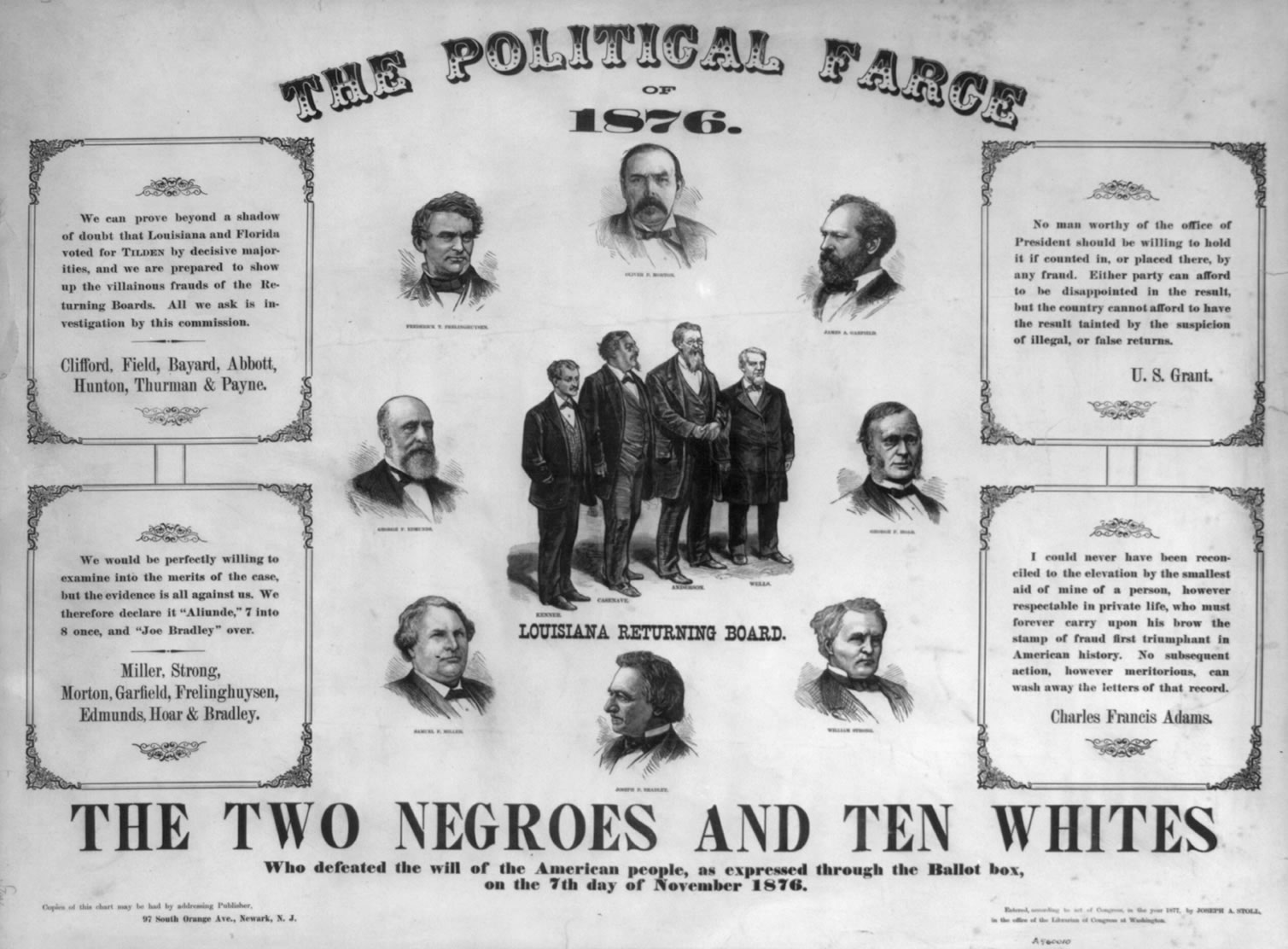
The election was hotly contested, as can be seen by this poster, which was published in 1877.

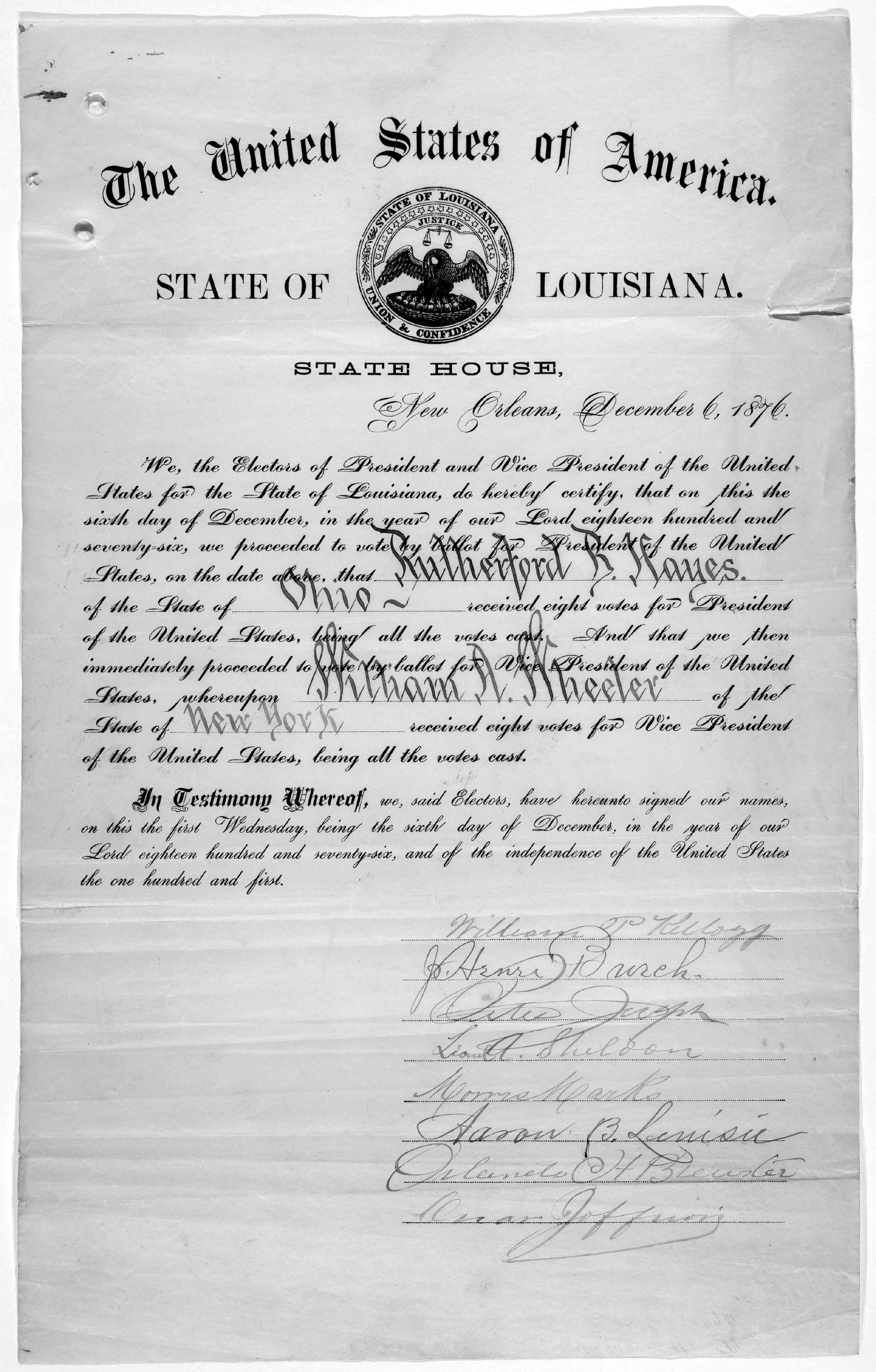
A certificate for the electoral vote for Rutherford B. Hayes and William A. Wheeler for the State of Louisiana

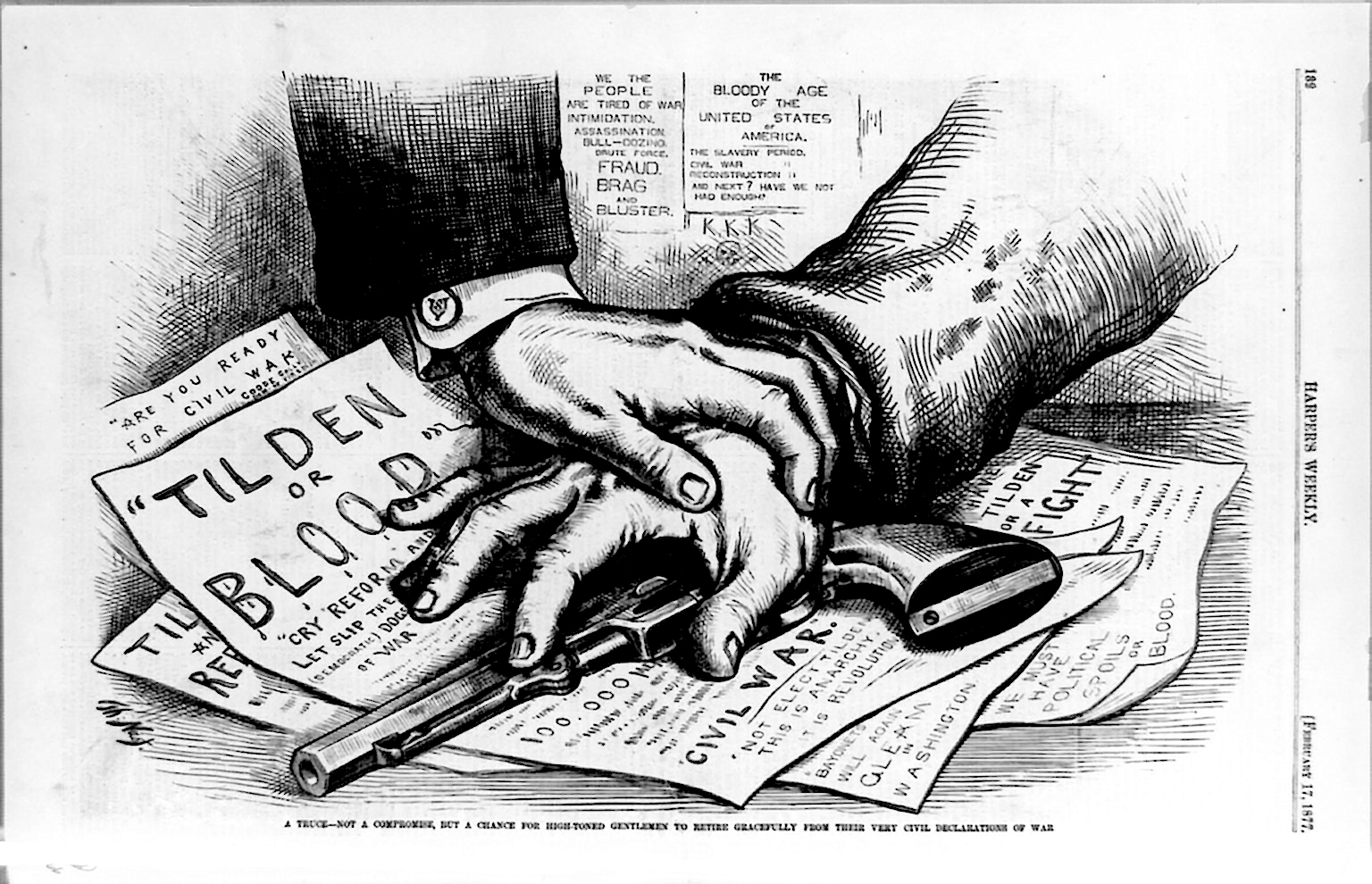
"A truce – not a compromise, but a chance for high-toned gentlemen to retire gracefully from their very civil declarations of war." By Thomas Nast in Harper's Weekly, February 17, 1877, p. 132.

Tilden, who had prosecuted machine politicians in New York and sent the political boss William M. Tweed to jail, ran as a reform candidate against the background of the corruption of the Grant administration. Both parties backed civil service reform. Both sides mounted mudslinging campaigns, with Democratic attacks on Republican corruption being countered by Republicans raising the Civil War issue, a tactic that was ridiculed by Democrats, who called it "waving the bloody shirt". Republicans chanted, "Not every Democrat was a rebel, but every rebel was a Democrat."

Hayes was a virtual unknown outside his home state of Ohio, where he had served two terms as a U.S. representative and then two terms as governor. Henry Adams called Hayes "a third-rate nonentity whose only recommendations are that he is obnoxious to no one". Hayes had served in the Civil War with distinction as colonel of the 23rd Ohio Regiment and was wounded several times, which made him marketable to veterans. He had later been brevetted as a major-general. His most important asset was his help to the Republican ticket in carrying Ohio, a crucial swing state. On the other side, the newspaperman John D. Defrees described Tilden as "a very nice, prim, little, withered-up, fidgety old bachelor, about one-hundred and twenty-pounds avoirdupois, who never had a genuine impulse for many nor any affection for woman".

The Democratic strategy for victory in the South relied on paramilitary groups such as the Red Shirts and the White League. These groups saw themselves as the military wing of the Democrats. Using the strategy of the Mississippi Plan, they actively suppressed both black and white Republican voting. They violently disrupted meetings and rallies, attacked party organizers, and threatened potential voters with retaliation for voting Republican.

Because it was considered improper for a candidate to pursue the presidency actively, neither Tilden nor Hayes appeared publicly during the campaign. Speaking and leading rallies were left to their surrogates.

=== Colorado ===
Colorado was admitted to the Union as the 38th state on August 1, 1876; this was the first presidential election in which the state sent electors. There was insufficient time or money to organize a presidential election in the new state. Therefore, Colorado's state legislature selected the state's three members of the Electoral College. The Republican Party held a slim majority in the state legislature following a closely contested election on October 3, 1876. Many of the seats in that election had been decided by only a few hundred votes. On November 7, 1876, in a 50 to 24 vote, the state legislature chose Otto Mears, William Hadley, and Herman Beckurts to serve as the state's electors for president. All three of the state's electors cast their votes for Hayes. This was the last election in which any state chose electors through its state legislature, rather than by popular vote.

== Electoral disputes and Compromise of 1877 ==
Florida (with four electoral votes) and Louisiana (with eight) reported returns that favored Tilden, while Hayes led in South Carolina (with seven). However, the elections in each state were marked by electoral fraud and threats of violence against Republican voters. The most extreme case was in South Carolina, where an impossible 101 percent of all eligible voters in the state had their votes counted, and an estimated 150 Black Republicans were murdered. One of the points of contention revolved around the design of ballots. At the time, parties would print ballots or "tickets" to enable voters to support them in the open ballots. To aid illiterate voters, the parties would print symbols on the tickets, and in this election, many Democratic ballots were printed with the Republican symbol of Abraham Lincoln on them. The Republican-dominated state electoral commissions subsequently rejected enough Democratic votes to award their electoral votes to Hayes.

In two Southern states, the governor recognized by the United States had signed the Republican certificates; the Democratic certificates from Florida were signed by the state attorney-general and the newly elected Democratic governor. Those from Louisiana were signed by the Democratic gubernatorial candidate and those from South Carolina by no state official. The Tilden electors in South Carolina claimed that they had been chosen by the popular vote although they were rejected by the state election board.

Meanwhile, in Oregon, the vote of a single elector was disputed. The statewide result clearly favored Hayes, but the state's Democratic governor, La Fayette Grover, claimed that one of the Republican electors, Ex-Postmaster John Watts, was ineligible under Article II, Section 1, of the United States Constitution since he had been a "person holding an office of trust or profit under the United States." Grover substituted a Democratic elector in Watts's place.

The two Republican electors dismissed Grover's action and reported three votes for Hayes. However, the Democratic elector, C. A. Cronin, reported one vote for Tilden and two votes for Hayes. The two Republican electors presented a certificate signed by the secretary of state of Oregon, and Cronin and the two electors whom he appointed (Cronin voted for Tilden while his associates voted for Hayes) presented a certificate signed by the governor and attested by the secretary of state.

Ultimately, all three of Oregon's votes were awarded to Hayes, who had a majority of one in the Electoral College. The Democrats claimed fraud, and suppressed excitement pervaded the country. Threats were even muttered that Hayes would never be inaugurated. In Columbus, Ohio, a shot was fired at Hayes's residence as he sat down to dinner. After supporters marched to his home to call for the President, Hayes urged the crowd that "it is impossible, at so early a time, to obtain the result". Grant quietly strengthened the military force in and around Washington.

The Constitution provides that "the President of the Senate shall, in presence of the Senate and House of Representatives, open all the [electoral] certificates, and the votes shall then be counted." The Republicans held that the power to count the votes lay with the President of the Senate, with the House and Senate being mere spectators. The Democrats objected to that construction, since the President Pro Tempore of the Senate, the Republican Thomas W. Ferry, could then count the votes of the disputed states for Hayes.

The Democrats insisted that Congress should continue the practice followed since 1865: no vote objected to should be counted except by the concurrence of both houses. Since the House had a solid Democratic majority, rejecting the vote of one state, therefore, would elect Tilden.

Facing an unprecedented constitutional crisis, the Congress passed a law on January 29, 1877, to form a 15-member Electoral Commission, which would settle the result. Five members were selected from each house of Congress, and they were joined by five members of the United States Supreme Court, with William M. Evarts serving as counsel for the Republican Party. The majority party in each house named three members and the minority party two members. As the Republicans controlled the Senate and the Democrats controlled the House of Representatives, that yielded five Democratic and five Republican members of the commission. Of the Supreme Court justices, two Republicans and two Democrats were chosen, with the fifth to be selected by those four.

The justices first selected the independent Justice David Davis. According to one historian, "No one, perhaps not even Davis himself, knew which presidential candidate he preferred." Just as the Electoral Commission Bill was passing Congress, the Illinois Legislature elected Davis to the Senate, and Democrats in the legislature believed that they had purchased Davis's support by voting for him. However, they had miscalculated, as Davis promptly excused himself from the commission and resigned as a Justice to take his Senate seat. As all of the remaining available Justices were Republicans, Republican Justice Joseph P. Bradley, who was considered the most impartial remaining member of the court was selected. That selection proved decisive.

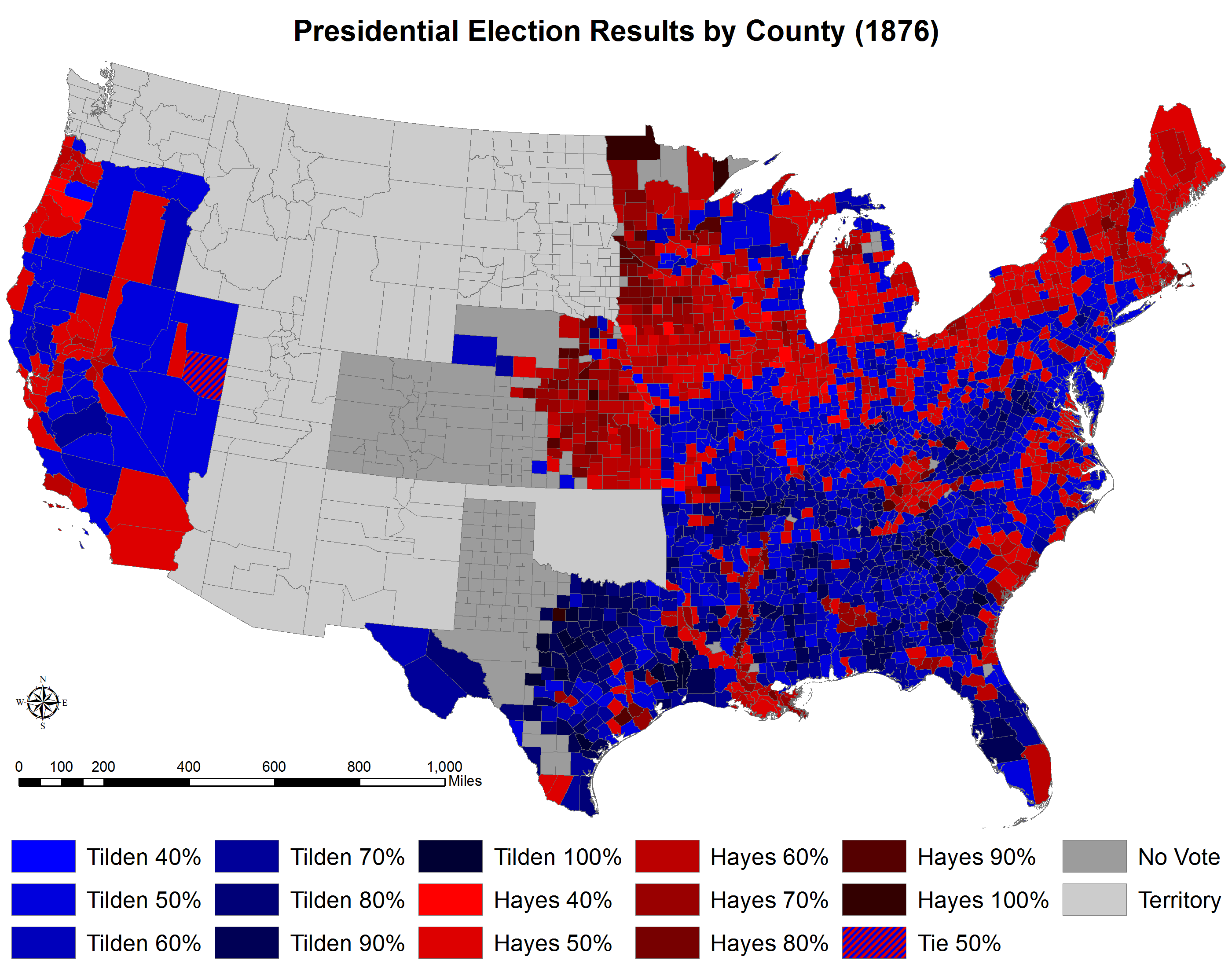
Results by county explicitly indicating the percentage of the winning candidate in each county. Shades of blue are for Tilden (Democratic), and shades of red are for Hayes (Republican). Note that Ripon – the commonly recognized birthplace of the Republican Party – is in Fond du Lac County, Wisconsin, which voted for Tilden.

It was drawing perilously near to Inauguration Day, and thus the commission met on January 31. Each of the disputed state election cases (Florida, Louisiana, Oregon, and South Carolina) was respectively submitted to the commission by Congress. Eminent counsel appeared for each side, and there were double sets of returns from every one of the states named.

The commission first decided not to question any returns that were prima facie lawful. Bradley then joined the other seven Republican committee members in a series of 8–7 votes that gave all 20 disputed electoral votes to Hayes, which gave Hayes a 185–184 electoral vote victory. The commission adjourned on March 2. Hayes privately took the oath of office the next day and was publicly sworn into office on March 5, 1877, and Hayes was inaugurated without disturbance.

The Compromise of 1877 might be a reason for the Democrats accepting the Electoral Commission. During intense closed-door meetings, Democratic leaders agreed reluctantly to accept Hayes as president in return for the withdrawal of federal troops from the last two Southern states that were still occupied: South Carolina and Louisiana. Republican leaders in return agreed on a number of handouts and entitlements, including federal subsidies for a transcontinental railroad line through the South. Although some of the promises were not kept, particularly the railroad proposal, that was enough for the time being to avert a dangerous standoff.

The returns accepted by the Commission put Hayes's margin of victory in South Carolina at 889 votes, the second-closest popular vote margin in a decisive state in U.S. history, after the election of 2000, which was decided by 537 votes in Florida. In 2000, the margin of victory in the Electoral College for George W. Bush was five votes, as opposed to Hayes' one vote.

Upon his defeat, Tilden said, "I can retire to public life with the consciousness that I shall receive from posterity the credit of having been elected to the highest position in the gift of the people, without any of the cares and responsibilities of the office."

Congress would eventually enact the Electoral Count Act in 1887 to provide more detailed rules for the counting of electoral votes, especially in cases of multiple slates of electors being received from a single state.

== Results ==
37.1% of the voting-age population and 82.6% of eligible voters participated in the election. According to the commission's rulings, of the 2,249 counties and independent cities making returns, Tilden won in 1,301 (57.9%), and Hayes carried only 947 (42.1%). One county (<0.1%) in Nevada split evenly between Tilden and Hayes.

The Greenback ticket did not have a major impact on the election's outcome by attracting slightly under one percent of the popular vote; nonetheless, Cooper had the strongest performance of any third-party presidential candidate since John Bell in 1860. The Greenbacks' best showings were in Kansas, where Cooper earned just over six percent of the vote, and in Indiana, where he earned 17,207 votes, which far exceeded Tilden's margin of victory of roughly 5,500 votes over Hayes in that state.

The election of 1876 was the last one held before the end of the Reconstruction era, which sought to protect the rights of African Americans in the South, who usually voted for Republican presidential candidates. No antebellum slave state would be carried by a Republican again until the dawn of the Fourth Party System in 1896, which saw William McKinley carry Delaware, Kentucky, Maryland, and West Virginia. This is the closest electoral college result in American history.

No Republican presidential candidate until Warren G. Harding in 1920 would carry any states that seceded and joined the Confederacy. That year, he carried Tennessee, which had never experienced a long period of occupation by federal troops and had been completely "reconstructed" well before the first presidential election of the Reconstruction period (1868). None of the Southern states that experienced long periods of occupation by federal troops were carried by a Republican again until Herbert Hoover in 1928, when he won Florida, North Carolina, Texas and Virginia. 1876 proved to be the last election until 1956 in which the Republican nominee carried Louisiana, as well as the last in which the Republican won South Carolina until 1964. Both states would not defect from the Democratic ticket again until 1948, when they backed the "Dixiecrat" candidate Strom Thurmond.

18.33% of Hayes' votes came from the eleven states of the former Confederacy, with him taking 40.40% of the vote in that region. Although 1876 marked the last competitive two-party election in the South before the Democratic dominance of the South until 1948 and of the Border States until 1896, it was also the last presidential election (as of 2024) in which the Democrats won the wartime Unionist Mitchell County, North Carolina; Wayne County, Tennessee; Henderson County, Tennessee; and Lewis County, Kentucky.

As of 2024, Hayes is the only Republican president ever to be elected who failed to carry Indiana, and was the first to win without Connecticut. This was also the last presidential election until 2016 that Florida voted Republican while Virginia voted Democratic.

Electoral results
Presidential candidate	Party	Home state	Popular vote		Electoral vote	Running mate		
Presidential candidate	Party	Home state	Count	Percentage	Electoral vote	Vice-presidential candidate	Home state	Electoral vote
Rutherford B. Hayes	Republican	Ohio	4,034,142	47.92%	185	William A. Wheeler	New York	185
Samuel J. Tilden	Democratic	New York	4,286,808	50.92%	184	Thomas A. Hendricks	Indiana	184
Peter Cooper	Greenback	New York	83,726	0.99%	0	Samuel Fenton Cary	Ohio	0
Green Clay Smith	Prohibition	Washington, D.C.	6,945	0.08%	0	Gideon T. Stewart	Ohio	0
James Walker	American National Party	Illinois	463	0.01%	0	Donald Kirkpatrick	New York	0
Other			6,575	0.08%	—	Other		—
Total			8,418,659	100%	369			369
Needed to win					185			185

Popular vote
Tilden	50.92%
Hayes	47.92%
Cooper	0.99%
Others	0.17%

Electoral vote
Hayes	50.14%
Tilden	49.86%

=== Geography of results ===
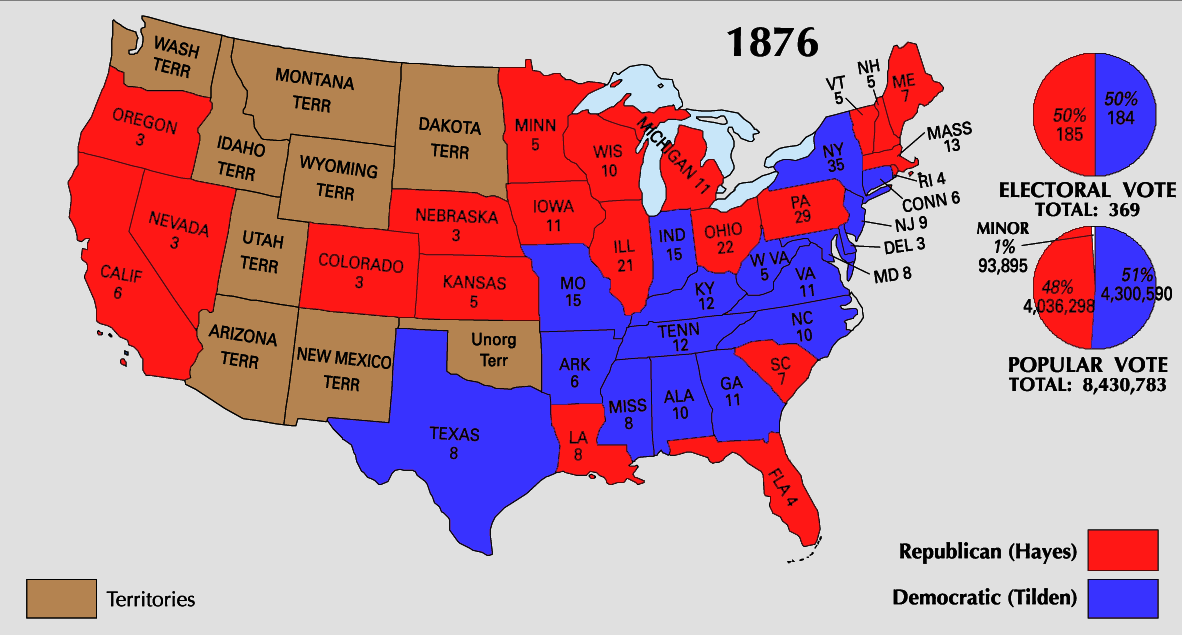

Results by county, shaded according to winning candidate's percentage of the vote

==== Cartographic gallery ====
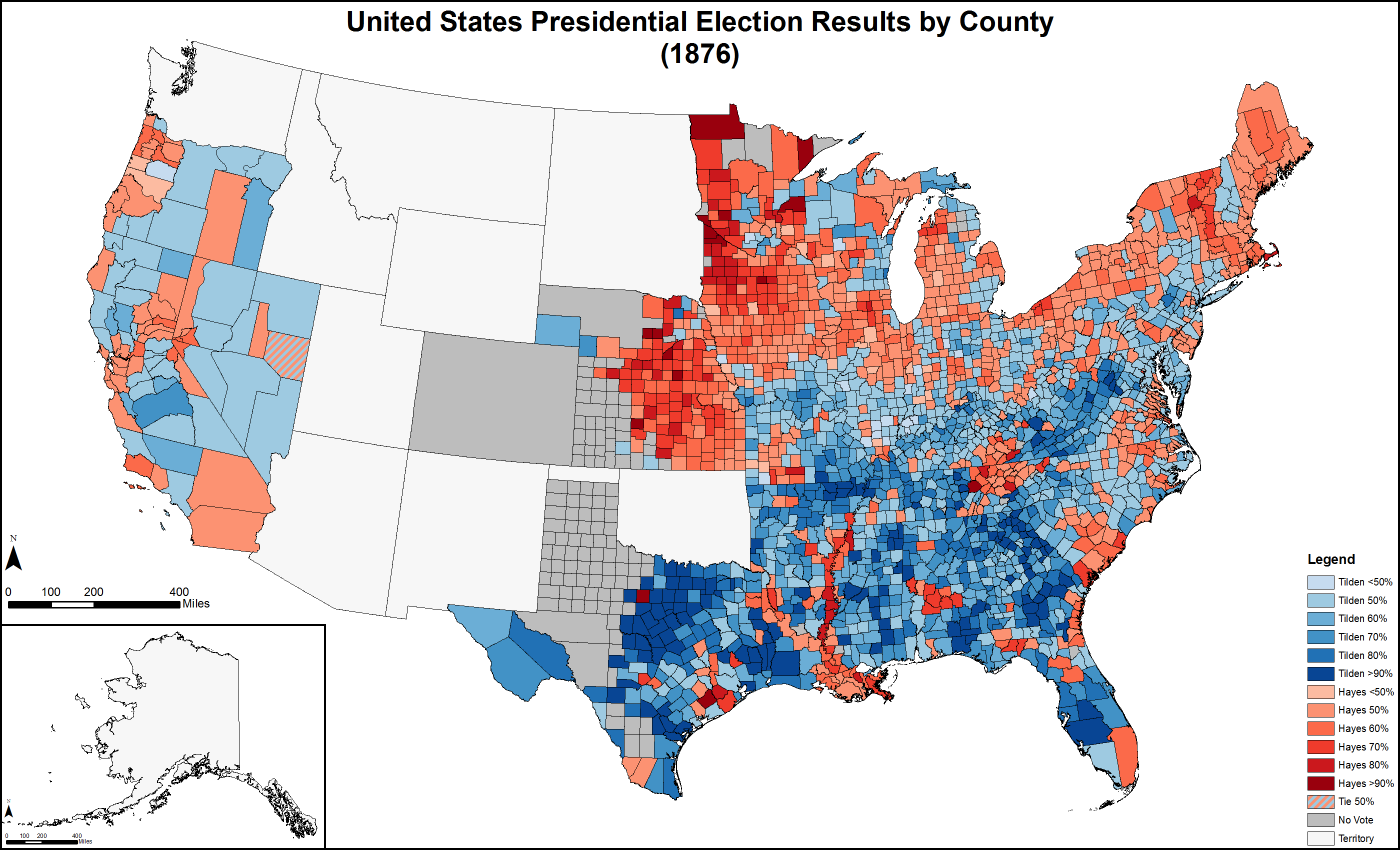
Map of presidential election results by county

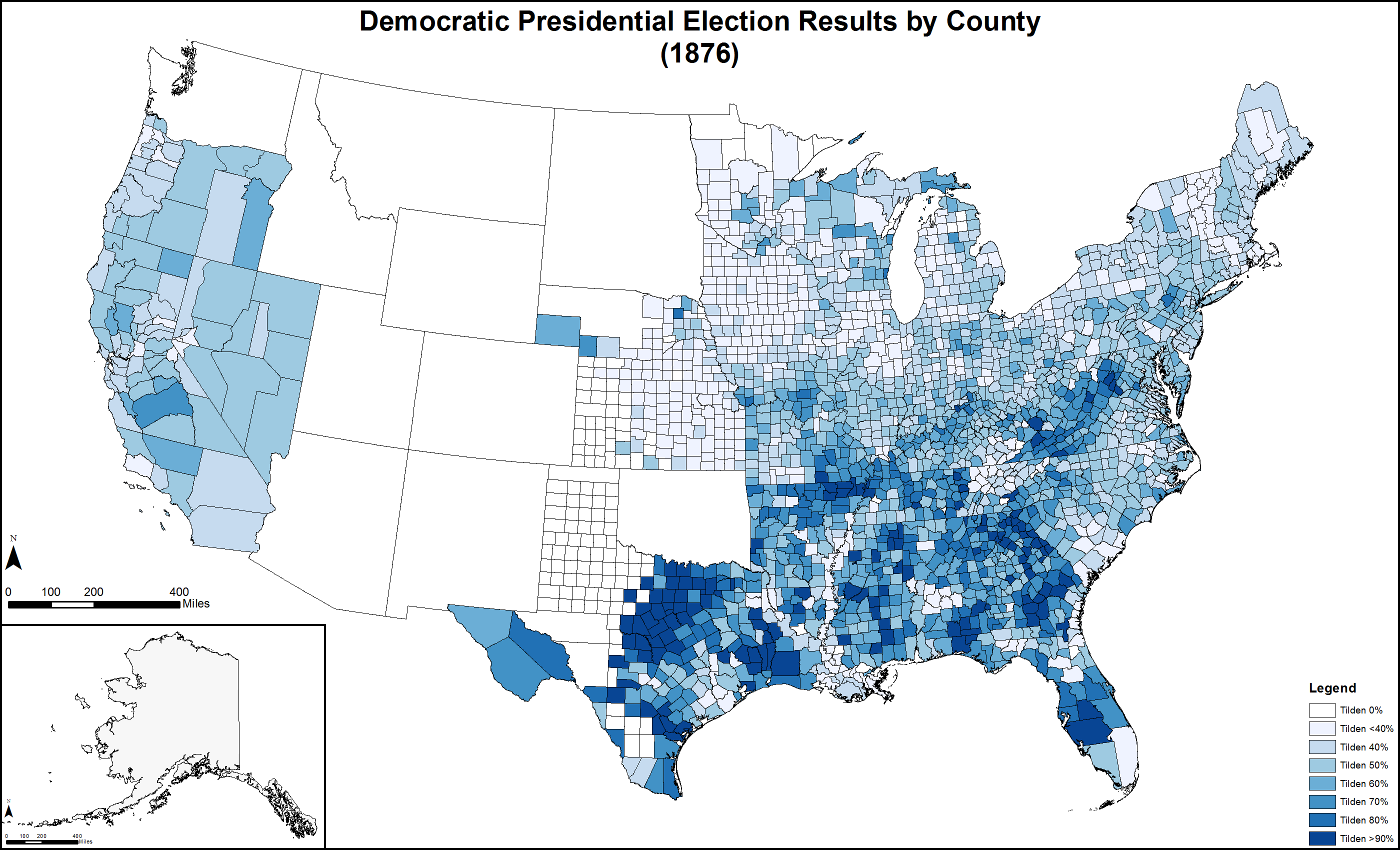
Map of Democratic presidential election results by county

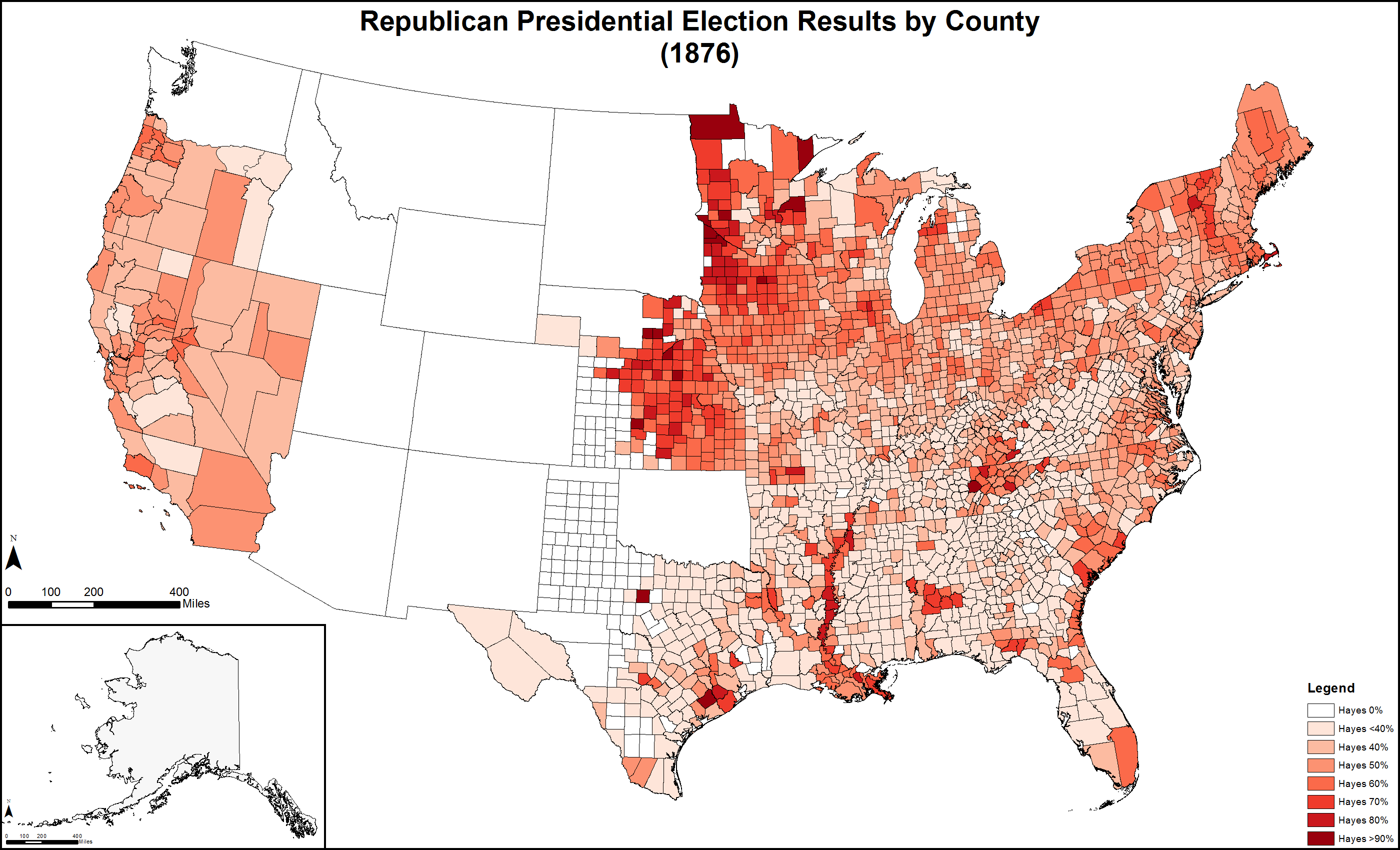
Map of Republican presidential election results by county

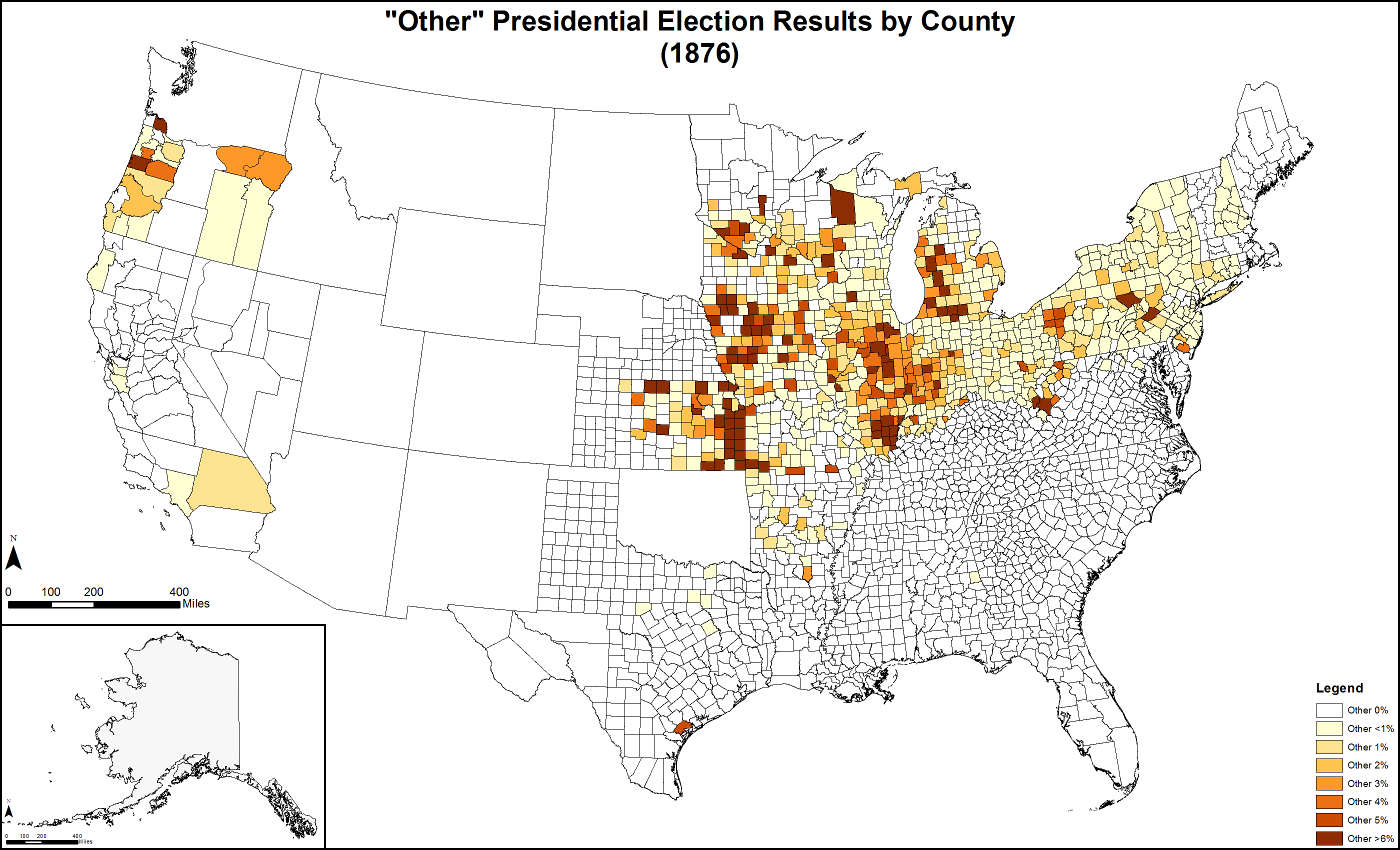
Map of "other" presidential election results by county

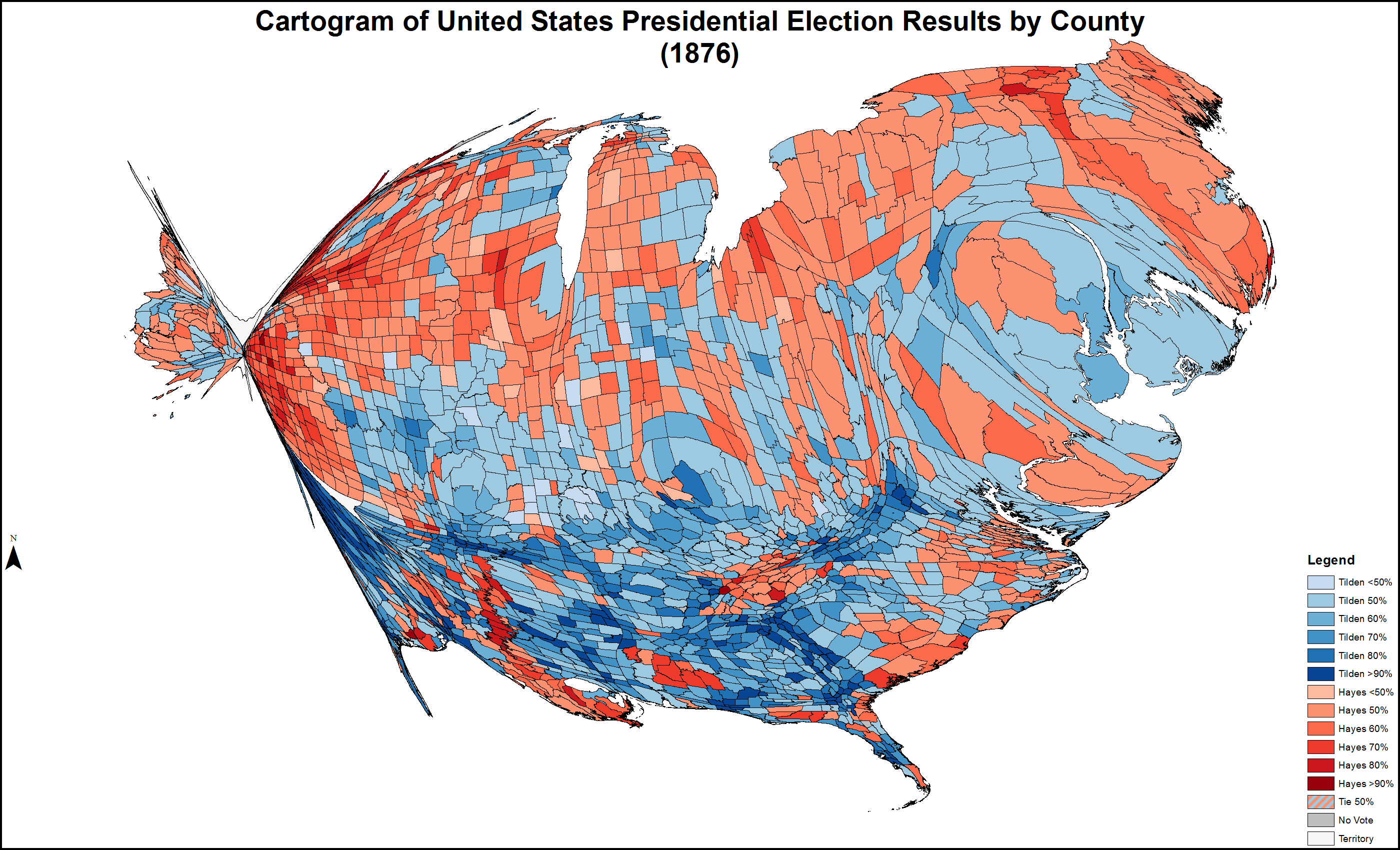
Cartogram of presidential election results by county

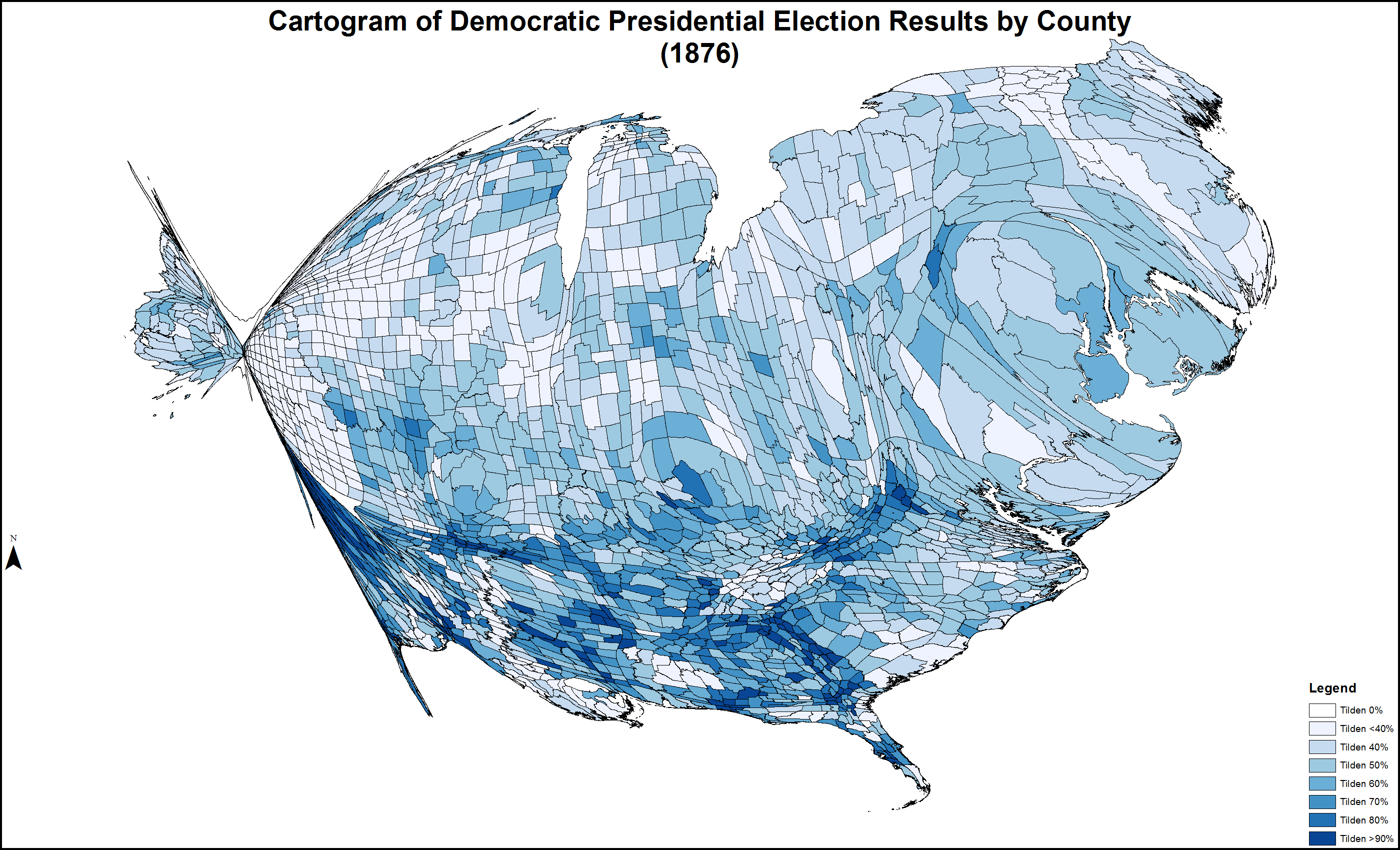
Cartogram of Democratic presidential election results by county

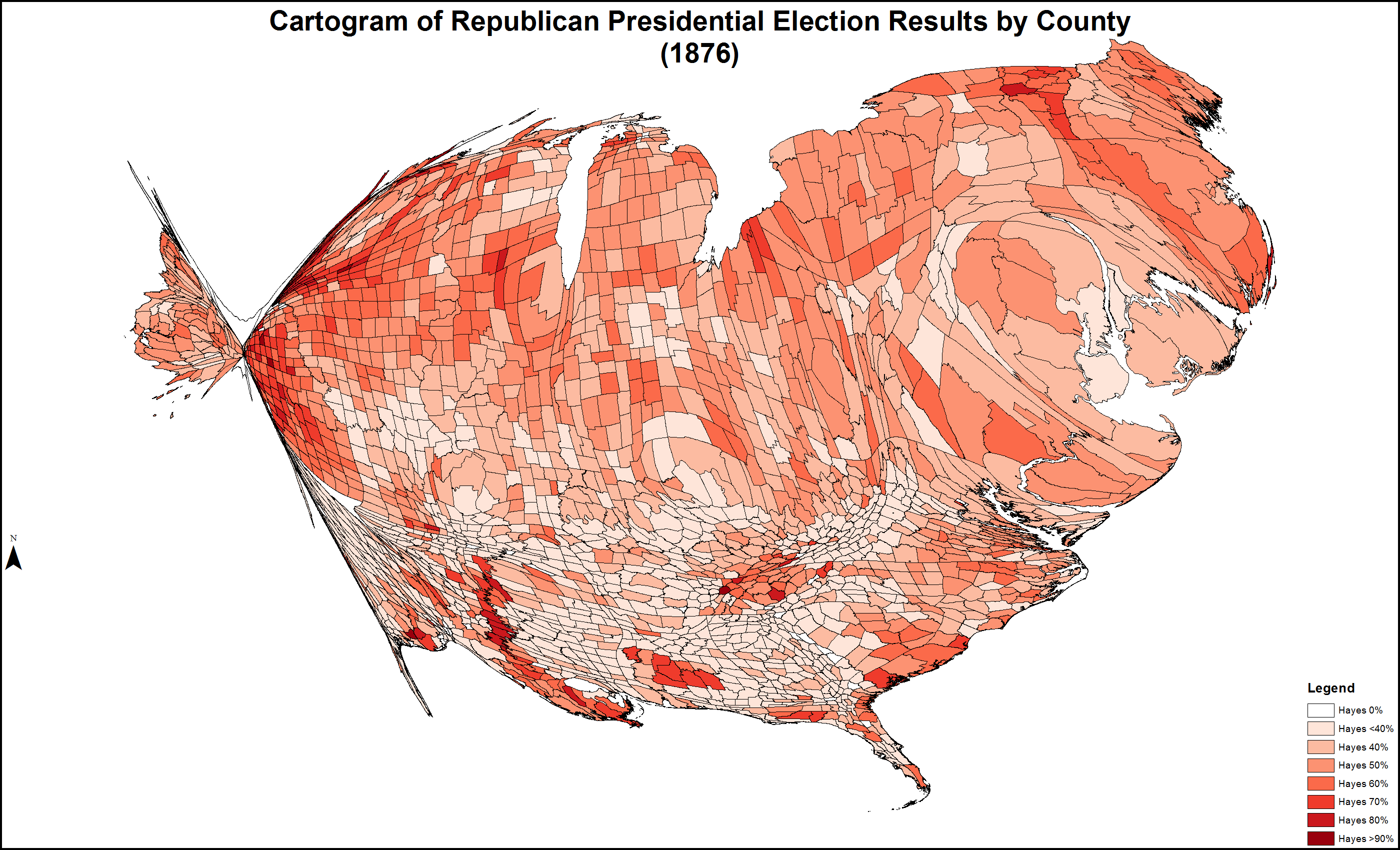
Cartogram of Republican presidential election results by county

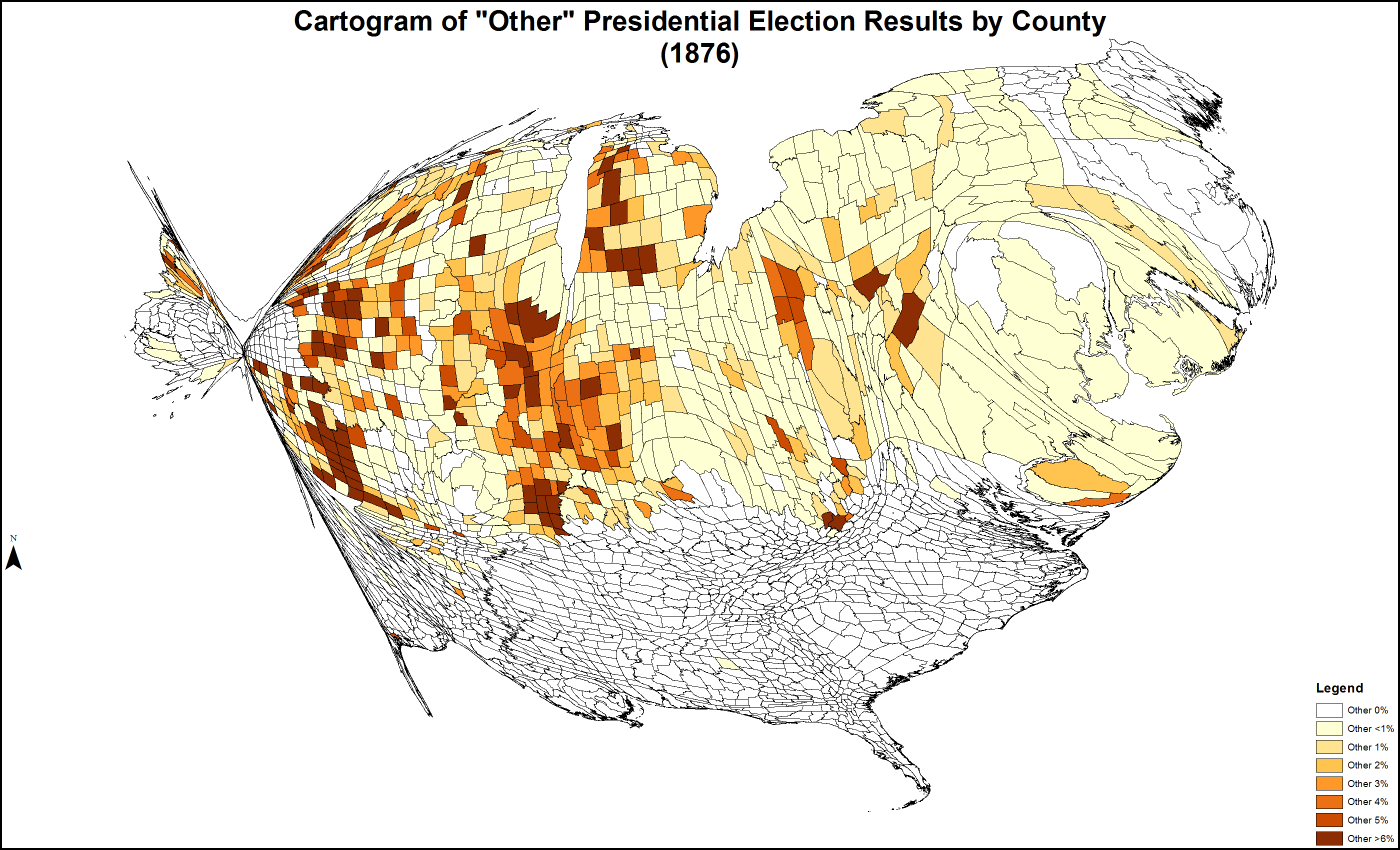
Cartogram of "other" presidential election results by county

=== Results by state ===
Source: Data from Walter Dean Burnham, Presidential ballots, 1836–1892 (Johns Hopkins University Press, 1955) pp 247–57.

States/districts won by Tilden/Hendricks
States/districts won by Hayes/Wheeler

		Samuel J. Tilden Democratic			Rutherford B. Hayes Republican			Peter Cooper Greenback			Green Smith Prohibition			Margin		State Total		
State	electoral votes	#	%	electoral votes	#	%	electoral votes	#	%	electoral votes	#	%	electoral votes	#	%	total votes cast	%	
Alabama	10	102,989	59.98	10	68,708	40.02	–	–	–	–	–	–	–	−34,281	−19.97	171,699	2.04%	AL
Arkansas	6	58,086	59.92	6	38,649	39.87	–	211	0.22	–	–	–	–	−19,437	−20.05	96,946	1.15%	AR
California	6	75,845	49.08	–	78,614	50.87	6	47	0.03	–	–	–	–	2,769	1.79	154,544	1.85%	CA
Colorado*	3	–	–	–	–	–	3	–	–	–	–	–	–	–	–	–	-	CO
Connecticut	6	61,927	50.70	6	59,033	48.33	–	774	0.63	–	374	0.31	–	−2,894	−2.37	122,134	1.45%	CT
Delaware	3	13,381	55.45	3	10,752	44.55	–	–	–	–	–	–	–	−2,629	−10.89	24,133	0.29%	DE
Florida	4	22,927	49.01	–	23,849	50.99	4	–	–	–	–	–	–	922	1.97	46,776	0.56%	FL
Georgia	11	130,157	72.03	11	50,533	27.97	–	–	–	–	–	–	–	−79,624	−44.07	180,690	2.15%	GA
Illinois	21	258,611	46.66	–	278,232	50.20	21	17,207	3.10	–	–	–	–	19,621	3.54	554,227	6.58%	IL
Indiana	15	213,526	48.65	15	208,011	47.39	–	17,233	3.93	–	141	0.03	–	−5,515	−1.26	438,911	5.21%	IN
Iowa	11	112,121	38.28	–	171,326	58.50	11	9,431	3.22	–	–	–	–	59,205	20.21	292,878	3.48%	IA
Kansas	5	37,902	30.53	–	78,324	63.10	5	7,770	6.26	–	110	0.09	–	40,422	32.56	124,134	1.47%	KS
Kentucky	12	160,060	61.41	12	97,568	37.44	–	–	–	–	–	–	–	−62,492	−23.98	260,626	3.10%	KY
Louisiana	8	70,508	48.35	–	75,315	51.65	8	–	–	–	–	–	–	4,807	3.30	145,823	1.73%	LA
Maine	7	49,917	42.65	–	66,300	56.64	7	–	–	–	–	–	–	16,383	14.00	117,045	1.39%	ME
Maryland	8	91,779	56.05	8	71,980	43.95	–	–	–	–	–	–	–	−19,799	−12.09	163,759	1.95%	MD
Massachusetts	13	108,777	41.90	–	150,064	57.80	13	–	–	–	–	–	–	41,287	15.90	259,620	3.08%	MA
Michigan	11	141,685	44.49	–	166,901	52.41	11	9,023	2.83	–	766	0.24	–	25,216	7.92	318,450	3.78%	MI
Minnesota	5	48,587	39.16	–	72,955	58.80	5	2,389	1.93	–	144	0.12	–	24,368	19.64	124,075	1.47%	MN
Mississippi	8	112,173	68.08	8	52,603	31.92	–	–	–	–	–	–	–	−59,570	−36.15	164,776	1.96%	MS
Missouri	15	202,086	57.64	15	145,027	41.36	–	3,497	1.00	–	–	–	–	−57,059	−16.27	350,610	4.16%	MO
Nebraska	3	17,413	35.30	–	31,915	64.70	3	–	–	–	–	–	–	14,502	29.40	49,328	0.59%	NE
Nevada	3	9,308	47.27	–	10,383	52.73	3	–	–	–	–	–	–	1,075	5.46	19,691	0.23%	NV
New Hampshire	5	38,510	48.05	–	41,540	51.83	5	–	–	–	–	–	–	3,030	3.78	80,141	0.95%	NH
New Jersey	9	115,962	52.66	9	103,517	47.01	–	714	0.32	–	–	–	–	−12,445	−5.65	220,193	2.62%	NJ
New York	35	521,949	51.40	35	489,207	48.17	–	1,978	0.19	–	2,369	0.23	–	−32,742	−3.22	1,015,503	12.06%	NY
North Carolina	10	125,427	53.62	10	108,484	46.38	–	–	–	–	–	–	–	−16,943	−7.24	233,911	2.78%	NC
Ohio	22	323,182	49.07	–	330,698	50.21	22	3,057	0.46	–	1,636	0.25	–	7,516	1.14	658,649	7.82%	OH
Oregon	3	14,157	47.38	–	15,214	50.92	3	510	1.71	–	–	–	–	1,057	3.54	29,881	0.35%	OR
Pennsylvania	29	366,204	48.25	–	384,184	50.62	29	7,204	0.95	–	1,318	0.17	–	17,980	2.37	758,993	9.02%	PA
Rhode Island	4	10,712	40.23	–	15,787	59.29	4	68	0.26	–	60	0.23	–	5,075	19.06	26,627	0.32%	RI
South Carolina	7	90,897	49.76	–	91,786	50.24	7	–	–	–	–	–	–	889	0.49	182,683	2.17%	SC
Tennessee	12	133,177	59.79	12	89,566	40.21	–	–	–	–	–	–	–	−43,611	−19.58	222,743	2.65%	TN
Texas	8	104,755	70.04	8	44,800	29.96	–	–	–	–	–	–	–	−59,955	−40.09	149,555	1.78%	TX
Vermont	5	20,254	31.38	–	44,091	68.30	5	–	–	–	–	–	–	23,837	36.93	64,553	0.77%	VT
Virginia	11	140,770	59.58	11	95,518	40.42	–	–	–	–	–	–	–	−45,252	−19.15	236,288	2.81%	VA
West Virginia	5	56,546	56.75	5	41,997	42.15	–	1,104	1.11	–	–	–	–	−14,549	−14.60	99,647	1.18%	WV
Wisconsin	10	123,926	48.19	–	130,067	50.57	10	1,509	0.59	–	27	0.01	–	6,141	2.39	257,177	3.05%	WI
Total	369	4,286,808	50.92	184	4,034,142	47.92	185	83,726	0.99	–	6,945	0.08	–	-252,666	-3.00	8,418,659	100%	US

=== States that flipped from Republican to Democratic ===
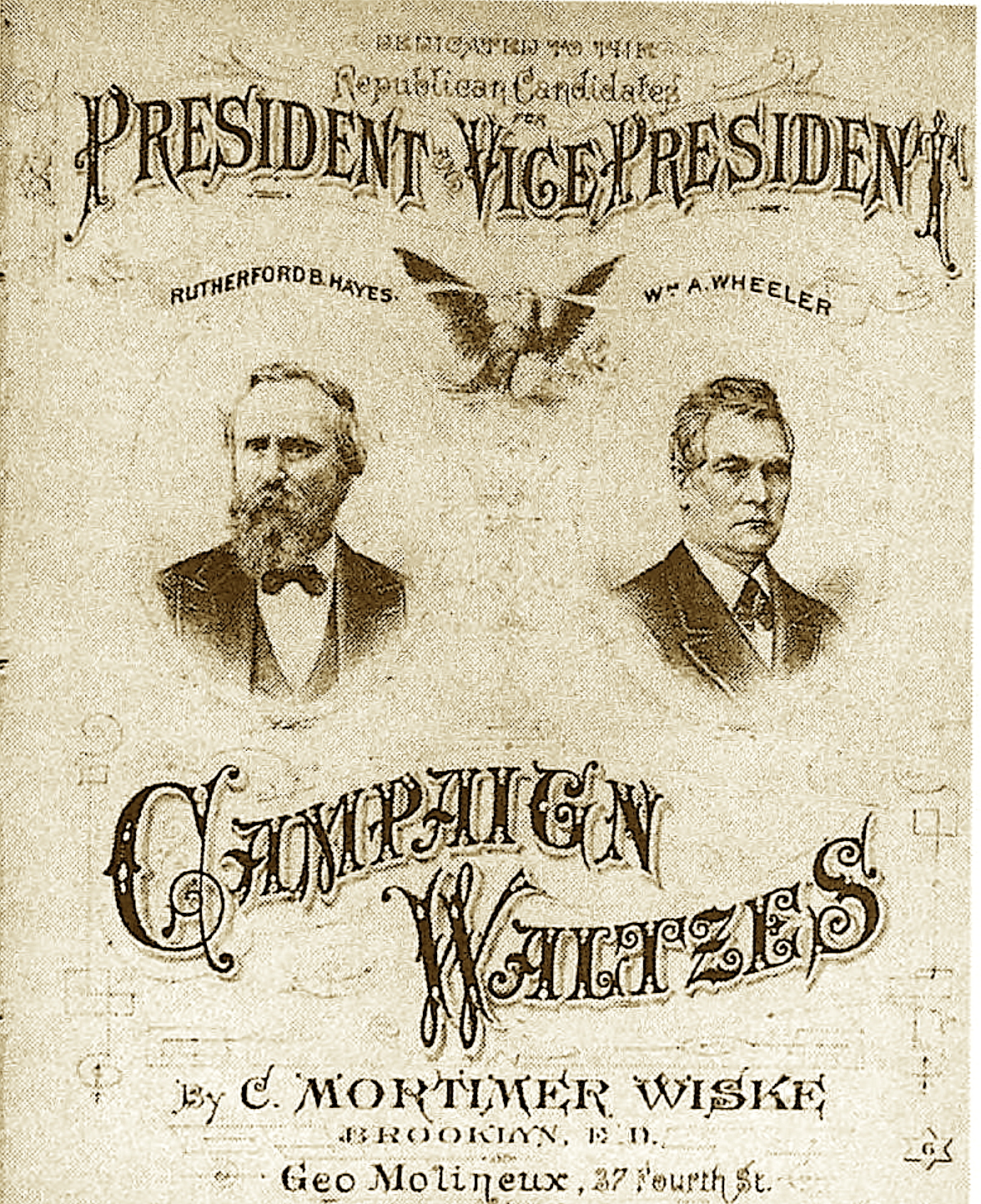
Front cover of sheet music for Campaign Waltzes by C. Mortimer Wiske. Composed for Hayes and Wheeler's campaign.

- Alabama
- Arkansas
- Connecticut
- Delaware
- Indiana
- Mississippi
- New Jersey
- New York
- North Carolina
- Virginia
- West Virginia

=== Close states ===
Margin of victory less than 1% (7 electoral votes):

1. South Carolina, 0.5% (889 votes) (tipping point state)

Margin of victory less between 1% and 5% (164 electoral votes):

1. Ohio, 1.1% (7,516 votes)
2. Indiana, 1.3% (5,515 votes)
3. California, 1.8% (2,798 votes)
4. Florida, 2.0% (922 votes)
5. Pennsylvania, 2.4% (17,980 votes)
6. Connecticut, 2.4% (2,894 votes)
7. Wisconsin, 2.4% (6,141 votes)
8. New York, 3.2% (32,742 votes)
9. Louisiana, 3.3% (4,807 votes)
10. Oregon, 3.5% (1,057 votes)
11. Illinois, 3.5% (19,621 votes)
12. New Hampshire, 3.8% (3,030 votes)

Margin of victory between 5% and 10% (33 electoral votes):

1. Nevada, 5.5% (1,075 votes)
2. New Jersey, 5.7% (12,445 votes)
3. North Carolina, 7.2% (16,943 votes)
4. Michigan, 7.9% (25,216 votes)

== Cultural references ==
- The presidential election of 1876 is a major theme of Gore Vidal's novel 1876.

== See also ==
- American election campaigns in the 19th century
- History of the United States (1865–1918)
- Inauguration of Rutherford B. Hayes
- 1876–77 United States House of Representatives elections
- 1876–77 United States Senate elections
- Disputed government of South Carolina of 1876–77
- Third Party System
- Contested elections in American history

== Works cited ==
- Abramson, Paul; Aldrich, John; Rohde, David (1995). Change and Continuity in the 1992 Elections. CQ Press. ISBN 0871878399.
- Sherman, Richard (1973). The Republican Party and Black America From McKinley to Hoover 1896-1933. University of Virginia Press. ISBN 0813904676.

== Sources ==
- John Bigelow, Author, Edited by, Nikki Oldaker, The Life of Samuel J. Tilden (2009 Revised edition-retype-set-new photos). 444 pages, ISBN 978-0-9786698-1-2 original 1895 edition
- Holt, Michael F. By One Vote: The Disputed Presidential Election of 1876 (2008). 304 pages, ISBN 978-0-7006-1608-4
- Flick, Alexander C. (1939). Samuel J. Tilden – A Study In Political Sagacity.
- Foley, Edward. 2016. Ballot Battles: The History of Disputed Elections in the United States. Oxford University Press.
- Haworth, Paul Leland (1906). The Hayes-Tilden Disputed Presidential Election of 1876. Burrows Brothers Company. "Campaign Text Book."
- Hoogenboom, Ari (1995). Rutherford B. Hayes: Warrior and President. University Press of Kansas. ISBN 0-7006-0641-6.
- Huntzicker, William E. "Thomas Nast, Harper's Weekly, and the Election of 1876." in After The War (Routledge, 2017), pp. 53–68.
- Morris, Roy Jr. (2004). Fraud Of The Century: Rutherford B. Hayes, Samuel Tilden And The Stolen Election Of 1876.
- Polakoff, Keith Ian (1973). The Politics of Inertia: The Election of 1876 and the End of Reconstruction.
- Rehnquist, William H. (2004). The Centennial Crisis: The Disputed Election of 1876. Knopf Publishing Group. ISBN 0-375-41387-1., popular account
- Summers, Mark Wahlgren. The Press Gang: Newspapers and Politics, 1865–1878 (1994)
- Summers, Mark Wahlgren. The Era of Good Stealings (1993), covers corruption 1868–1877
- Richard White, "Corporations, Corruption, and the Modern Lobby: A Gilded Age Story of the West and the South in Washington, D.C." Southern Spaces, April 16, 2009
- Woodward, C. Vann (1951). Reunion and Reaction: The Compromise of 1877 and the End of Reconstruction.
