= Timeline of the Rutherford B. Hayes presidency =

The presidency of Rutherford B. Hayes began on March 4, 1877, when Rutherford B. Hayes became the nineteenth president of the United States and ended on March 4, 1881, after one term.

== 1877 ==
=== March 1877 ===
- March 4 – Rutherford B. Hayes becomes the nineteenth president of the United States. He had taken the oath of office in a private ceremony at the White House the previous day. William A. Wheeler becomes vice president of the United States.
- March 5 – Hayes is inaugurated as president.
- March 8 – Hayes submits his cabinet nominations to the Senate for approval, where he faces opposition. John Sherman becomes secretary of the treasury.
- March 12 – William M. Evarts, George W. McCrary, Charles Devens, David M. Key, Richard W. Thompson, and Carl Schurz become secretary of state, secretary of war, attorney general, postmaster general, secretary of the navy, and secretary of the interior, respectively.
- March 15 – Hayes appoints Frederick Douglass as United States Marshal for the District of Columbia.
- March 20 – Hayes and his Cabinet decide to send a commission to Louisiana.

=== April 1877 ===
- April 10 – After negotiations, Wade Hampton III succeeds Daniel Henry Chamberlain as governor of South Carolina and Hayes withdraws the army.
- April 22 – Hayes recalls soldiers from the Southern states.
- April 24 – Hayes withdraws the army from Louisiana.

=== May 1877 ===
- May 10 – The first White House telephone is installed.
- May 26 – Hayes issues an executive order "prohibiting political assessment of customs house employees".

=== June 1877 ===
- June 1 – Hayes sends the army to patrol the Mexico–United States border.
- June 2 – Horace Maynard succeeds David M. Key as postmaster general, but Key will continue acting as postmaster general until Maynard takes office in August.
- June 17 – The Nez Perce people win the first battle of the Nez Perce War against the United States.
- June 22 – Hayes issues an executive order banning federal employees from engaging in political activity and banning the termination of federal employees for political reasons.
- June 26 – Hayes begins a tour of Connecticut, Massachusetts, and Rhode Island.
- June 29 – Hayes returns from his tour of Connecticut, Massachusetts, and Rhode Island.

=== July 1877 ===
- July 16 – The Baltimore railroad strike of 1877 begins in Maryland following cuts to workers' pay. It leads into the Great Railroad Strike of 1877 as it spreads to other states and becomes the first major nationwide strike in the United States.
- July 21 – Federal soldiers are sent to quell the Great Railroad Strike in Maryland and West Virginia.
- July 23 – Federal soldiers are sent to quell the Great Railroad Strike in Pennsylvania.

=== August 1877 ===
- August 16 – Hayes begins a tour of Massachusetts, New Hampshire, and Vermont.
- August 24 – Hayes returns from his tour of Massachusetts, New Hampshire, and Vermont.
- August 25 – Horace Maynard begins serving in his duties as postmaster general. He had succeeded David M. Key in June, but Key had continued fulfilling the duties.

=== September 1877 ===
- September 6 – Hayes announces that he will remove Chester A. Arthur as Collector of the Port of New York. Arthur is an ally of Hayes's political rival Senator Roscoe Conkling.
- September 7 – Hayes begins a tour of Ohio, Kentucky, Tennessee, Georgia, and Virginia.

=== October 1877 ===
- October 5 – The Nez Perce War ends when Chief Joseph, the leader of the Nez Perce, surrenders.
- October 15 – The 45th United States Congress convenes for its first session.
- October 16 – Hayes nominates John Marshall Harlan to the Supreme Court.
- October 24
  - Hayes nominates three people to the New York Customs House to succeed the officials he fired.
  - The United States signs a trademarks treaty with the United Kingdom.
- October 25 – Hayes returns from his tour of Ohio, Kentucky, Tennessee, Georgia, and Virginia.
- October 29 – The Senate rejects Hayes's nominations to the New York Customs House.

=== November 1877 ===
- November 29 – John Marshall Harlan is confirmed to the Supreme Court.

=== December 1877 ===
- December 3
  - The 45th United States Congress adjourns from its first session. It convenes for its second session the same day.
  - Hayes delivers the 1877 State of the Union Address. He calls for federal education funding and laws to protect the welfare of former slaves.
- December 6 – John Baxter is confirmed to the U.S. Circuit Court for the Sixth Circuit.
- December 12 – Bancroft Davis is confirmed to the United States Court of Claims.

== 1878 ==
=== January 1878 ===
- January 1 – The Knights of Labor becomes an official national organization dedicated to national unionization.
- January 17 – The United States signs a treaty of friendship and commerce with Samoa.

=== February 1878 ===
- February 15 – Samuel Blatchford is confirmed to the U.S. Circuit Court for the Second Circuit.
- February 28 – Hayes vetoes the Bland–Allison Act that would reintroduce $2 million to $4 million in silver coins per month. This is the only one of Hayes's vetoes that Congress will override.

=== March 1878 ===
- March 1 – Hayes vetoes a bill that would ban any ship that has more than 15 Chinese people on it from entering the United States. Instead, he negotiates changes to the Burlingame Treaty to limit immigration.
- March 23 – The United States recognizes Porfirio Díaz as President of Mexico.

=== April 1878 ===
- April 18 – William Henry Hunt is confirmed to the U.S. Court of Claims.

=== May 1878 ===
- May 1 – The House opens an investigation into the disputed 1876 presidential election and resulting Compromise of 1877 that selected Hayes as president.
- May 8 – The United States signs a treaty of rights, privileges, and immunities of consular officers with the Kingdom of Italy.
- May 23 – The United States signs a treaty of rights, privileges, and immunities of consular officers with the Netherlands.

=== June 1878 ===
- June 1 – The United States joins a convention with several other nations to form a Universal Postal Union.
- June 18 – The Posse Comitatus Act bans the use of the army to enforce the law without authorization.
- June 20 – The 45th United States Congress adjourns from its second session.

=== July 1878 ===
- July 11 – Hayes suspends Chester A. Arthur and Alonzo B. Corness from the New York Customs House.
- July 25 – The United States signs a revision of commercial treaties with Japan.

=== September 1878 ===
- September 4 – Hayes begins a tour of Wisconsin, Minnesota, Illinois, Ohio, and Pennsylvania.
- September 24
  - Hayes returns from a tour of Wisconsin, Minnesota, Illinois, Ohio, and Pennsylvania.
  - The United States signs a trademarks treaty with the Empire of Brazil.

=== November 1878 ===
- November – The 1878 United States elections take place. The Democratic Party takes control of both chambers of Congress.

=== December 1878 ===
- December 2
  - The 45th United States Congress convenes for its third session.
  - Hayes delivers the 1878 State of the Union Address.
- December 18 – John Lowell is confirmed to the U.S. Circuit Court for the First Circuit.

== 1879 ==
=== January 1879 ===
- January 1 – Hayes restores the redemption of paper greenback currency for gold, based on the Specie Payment Resumption Act.

=== February 1879 ===
- February 3 – The Senate confirms Hayes's new appointments to the New York Customhouse.
- February 15 – Women are granted the right to practice before the Supreme Court.

=== March 1879 ===
- March 1 – Hayes vetoes a bill that would restrict Chinese immigration to the United States. He says that Congress does not have the power to modify the terms of a treaty.
- March 3 – The 45th United States Congress adjourns from its third session.
- March 18 – The 46th United States Congress convenes for its first session.

=== April 1879 ===
- April 1 – The Universal Postal Union succeeds the General Postal Union as an international organization with the United States as a member.
- April 26 – Hayes issues a proclamation warning American citizens not to settle Indian territory.
- April 29 – Hayes vetoes the Army Appropriations Act of 1880 which included a ban on federal soldiers guarding polling locations during elections.

=== May 1879 ===
- May 12 – Hayes vetoes a bill that would prohibit federal soldiers from guarding polling locations during elections.
- May 29
  - Hayes vetoes another appropriations bill that would have banned federal soldiers from guarding polling locations during elections.
  - The United States enters into an agreement with Germany and the United Kingdom designating Samoa as neutral territory.

=== June 1879 ===
- June 23 – Hayes vetoes a bill to fund the judiciary because it includes rider that would ban federal soldiers from guarding polling locations.
- June 30 – Hayes vetoes a bill to fund the United States Marshals because it includes a rider that would ban federal soldiers from guarding polling locations.

=== July 1879 ===
- July 1 – The 46th United States Congress adjourns from its first session.

=== September 1879 ===
- September 9 – Hayes begins a tour of Ohio, Illinois, Kansas, and Missouri.

=== October 1879 ===
- October 18 – Hayes returns from a tour of Ohio, Illinois, Kansas, and Missouri.

=== December 1879 ===
- December 1
  - The 46th United States Congress convenes for its second session.
  - Hayes delivers the 1879 State of the Union Address.
- December 9 – George W. McCrary is confirmed to the U.S. Circuit Court for the Eighth Circuit.
- December 10 – Alexander Ramsey succeeds George W. McCrary as secretary of war.
- December 19 – Hayes proposes a bill to reclaim the Washington, D.C. marshes.

== 1880 ==
=== March 1880 ===
- March 8 – Hayes tells Congress that he supports building a canal in Central America to connect the Pacific and Atlantic Oceans.
- March 9 – The United States signs a treaty of rights, privileges, and immunities of consular officers with Belgium.
- March 24 – The United States enters into a new agreement with Germany and the United Kingdom to preserve the government of Samoa.

=== May 1880 ===
- May 4 – Hayes vetoes an appropriations bill because it contains a rider.
- May 22 – The United States signs an extradition treaty with Netherlands.

=== June 1880 ===
- June 7 – The 1880 Republican National Convention selects Speaker of the House James A. Garfield of the Republican Half-Breeds as the Republican Party's presidential nominee with Chester A. Arthur of the Republican Stalwarts as his running mate.
- June 15 – Hayes vetoes another bill to fund Deputy Marshals.
- June 16 – The 46th United States Congress adjourns from its second session.
- June 24 – The 1880 Democratic National Convention selects General Winfield Scott Hancock as the Democratic Party's presidential nominee with former Congressman William Hayden English as his running mate.

=== July 1880 ===
- July 3 – The United States and several European nations enter into a convention with Morocco for a right of protection.

=== August 1880 ===
- August 26 – Hayes begins a transcontinental tour to the west coast.

=== November 1880 ===
- November 2 – The 1880 United States elections take place. James A. Garfield wins the 1880 presidential election.
- November 6 – Hayes's transcontinental tour ends.
- November 17 – Qing China and the United States sign a treaty that limits Chinese immigration to the United States, bans the Chinese opium trade in the United States, and grants China stronger trading privileges.

=== December 1880 ===
- December 6
  - The 46th United States Congress convenes for its third session.
  - Hayes delivers the 1880 State of the Union Address. He calls for stronger protections of rights in the Constitution, prosecution of people who violate rights, and the establishment of universal education.
- December 15 – Hayes nominates William Burnham Woods to the Supreme Court.
- December 20 – Richard W. Thompson ends his tenure as secretary of the navy.
- December 21 – William Burnham Woods is confirmed to the Supreme Court.

== 1881 ==
=== January 1881 ===
- January 6 – Nathan Goff Jr. becomes secretary of the navy, filling the vacancy left by Richard W. Thompson.
- January 26 – Hayes nominates Stanley Matthews to the Supreme Court, but the nomination will be unsuccessful.

=== February 1881 ===
- February 22 – Hayes issues an executive order banning the sale of alcohol at army posts.
- February 24 – The United States signs a treaty of rights, privileges, and immunities of consular officers with Italy.

=== March 1881 ===
- March 3
  - Hayes vetoes a bill that would refund the national debt.
  - The 46th United States Congress adjourns from its third session.
- March 4 – Hayes's tenure as president ends and James A. Garfield is inaugurated as the twentieth president of the United States.

== See also ==
- Bibliography of Rutherford B. Hayes

== Works cited ==
- Bevans, Charles I. (1968). Treaties and Other International Agreements of the United States of America, 1776-1949. United States Department of State.
