= 1876 Republican National Convention =

American political convention

- 1876 presidential election
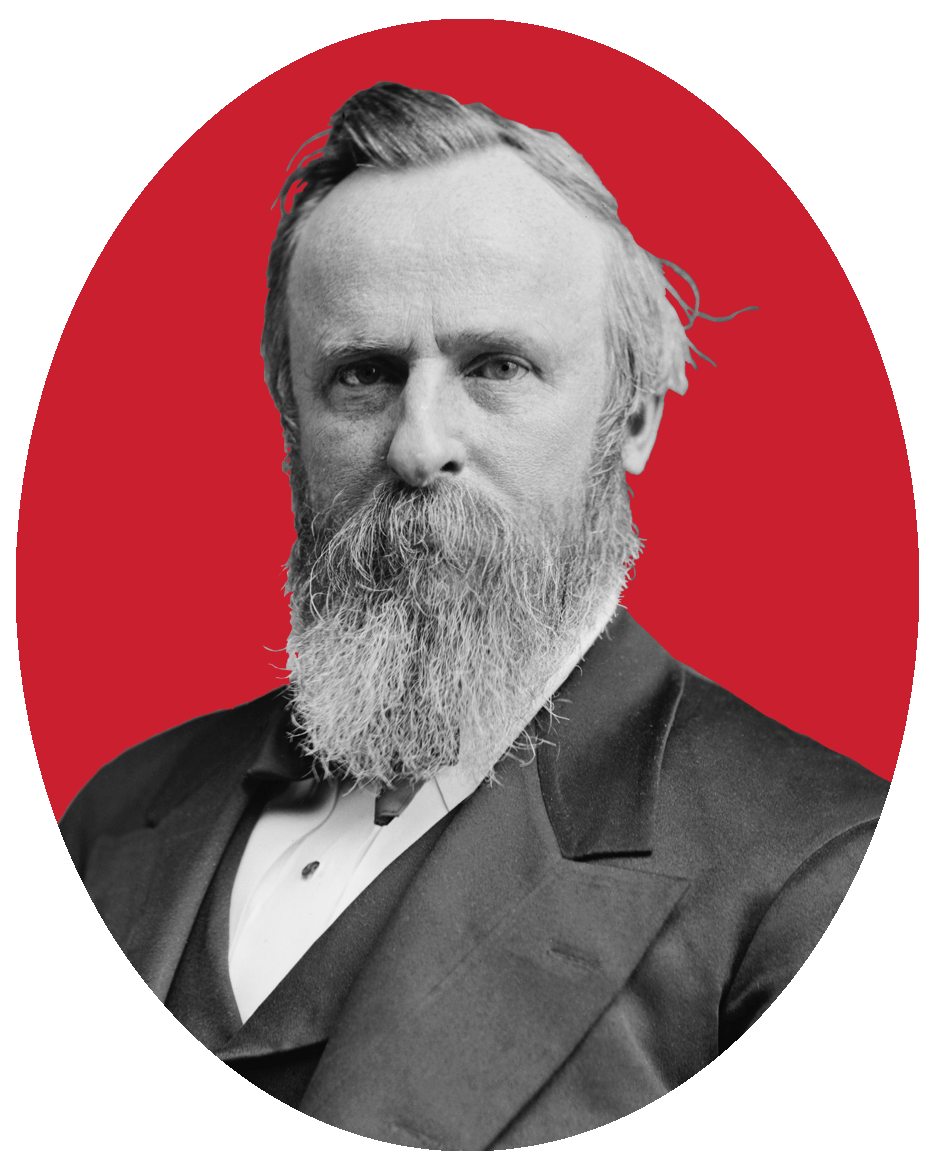
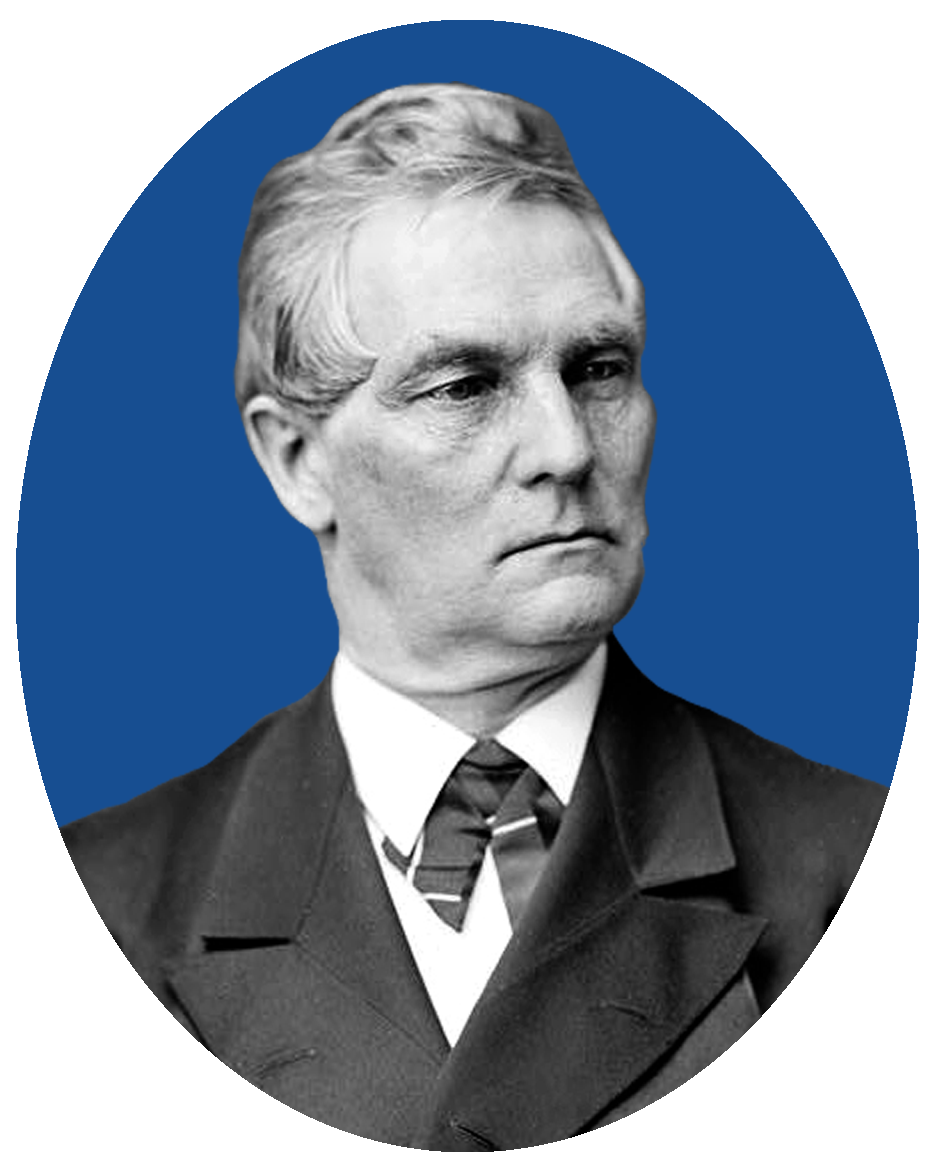
- Nominees; Hayes and Wheeler

Convention
- Dates: June 14–16, 1876
- City: Cincinnati, Ohio
- Venue: Exposition Hall

Candidates
- Presidential nominee: Rutherford B. Hayes of Ohio
- Vice-presidential nominee: William A. Wheeler of New York
- Other candidates: James G. Blaine; Benjamin H. Bristow

The 1876 Republican National Convention was a presidential nominating convention held at the Exposition Hall in Cincinnati, Ohio on June 14–16, 1876. President Ulysses S. Grant had considered seeking a third term, but with various scandals, a poor economy and heavy Democratic gains in the House of Representatives that led many Republicans to repudiate him, he declined to run. The convention resulted in the nomination of Governor Rutherford B. Hayes of Ohio for president and Representative William A. Wheeler of New York for vice president.

The Republican ticket of Hayes and Wheeler went on to lose the popular vote to Democrats Samuel J. Tilden and Thomas A. Hendricks in the election of 1876, but won the electoral vote after a controversy which was allegedly resolved by the Compromise of 1877.

== Overview ==
The convention was called to order by Republican National Committee chairman Edwin D. Morgan. Theodore M. Pomeroy served as the convention's temporary chairman and Edward McPherson served as permanent president.

The principal candidates at the convention included Senator James G. Blaine of Maine, the former Speaker of the House; Senator Oliver P. Morton of Indiana; Secretary of the Treasury Benjamin H. Bristow of Kentucky; Senator Roscoe Conkling of New York; Governor Rutherford B. Hayes of Ohio; and Governor John F. Hartranft of Pennsylvania. James Russell Lowell, well-known poet and a professor at Harvard College, spoke on behalf of Hayes.

Two candidates, Benjamin Bristow and Marshall Jewell of Connecticut, were serving as Cabinet members in the Grant administration.

== Presidential nomination ==
=== Presidential candidates ===
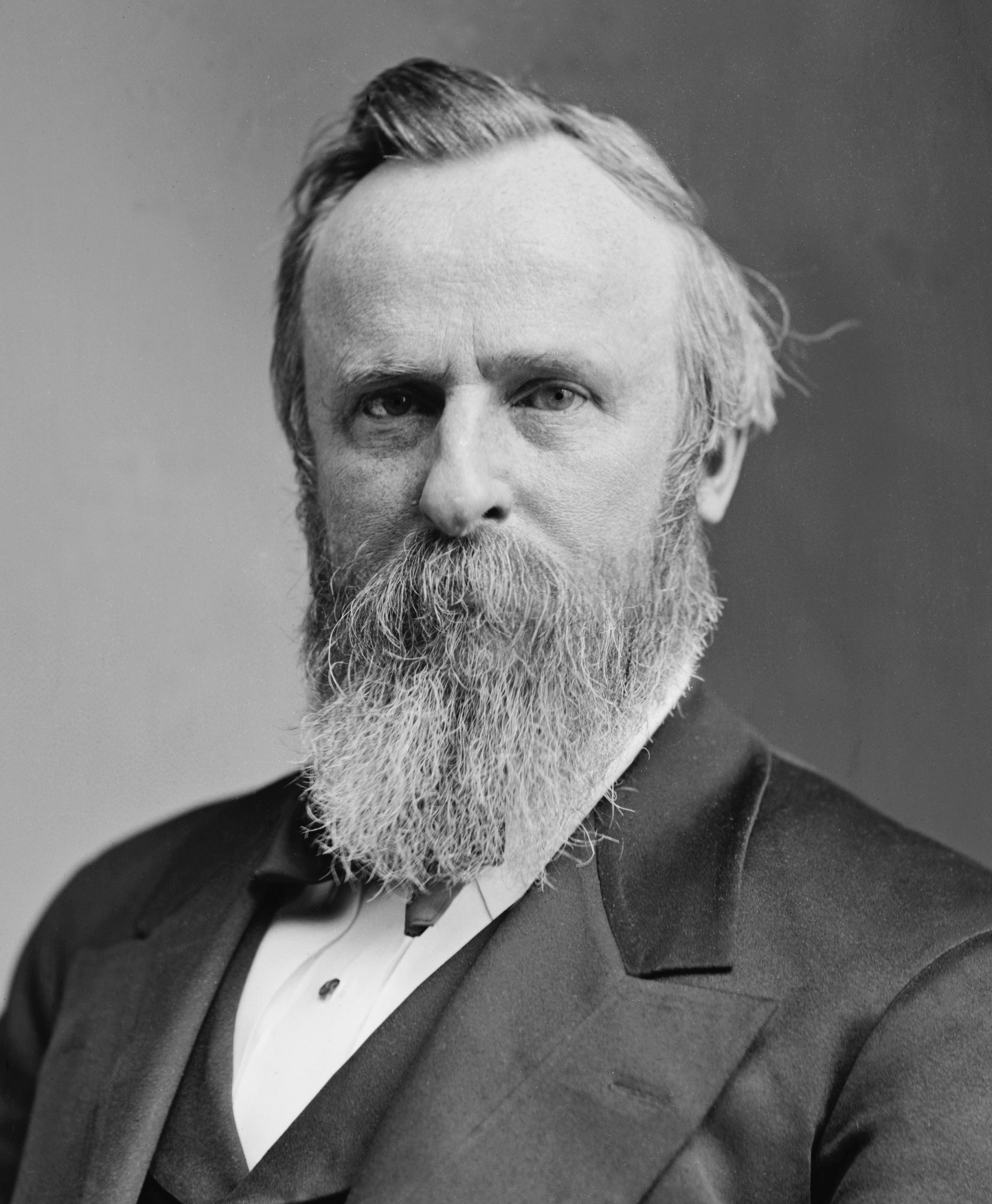
Governor
Rutherford B. Hayes
of Ohio

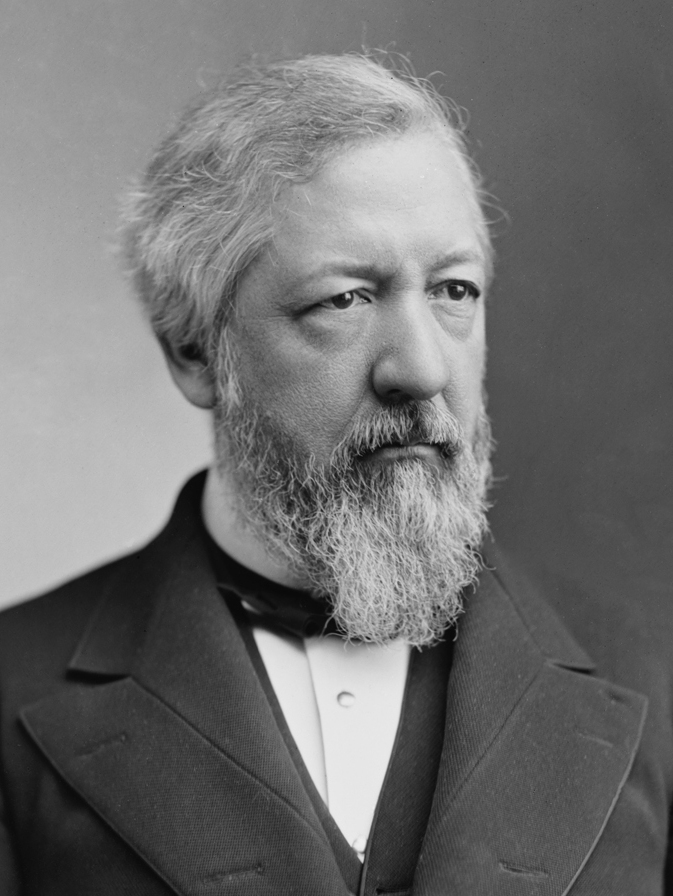
Former Speaker
James G. Blaine
of Maine

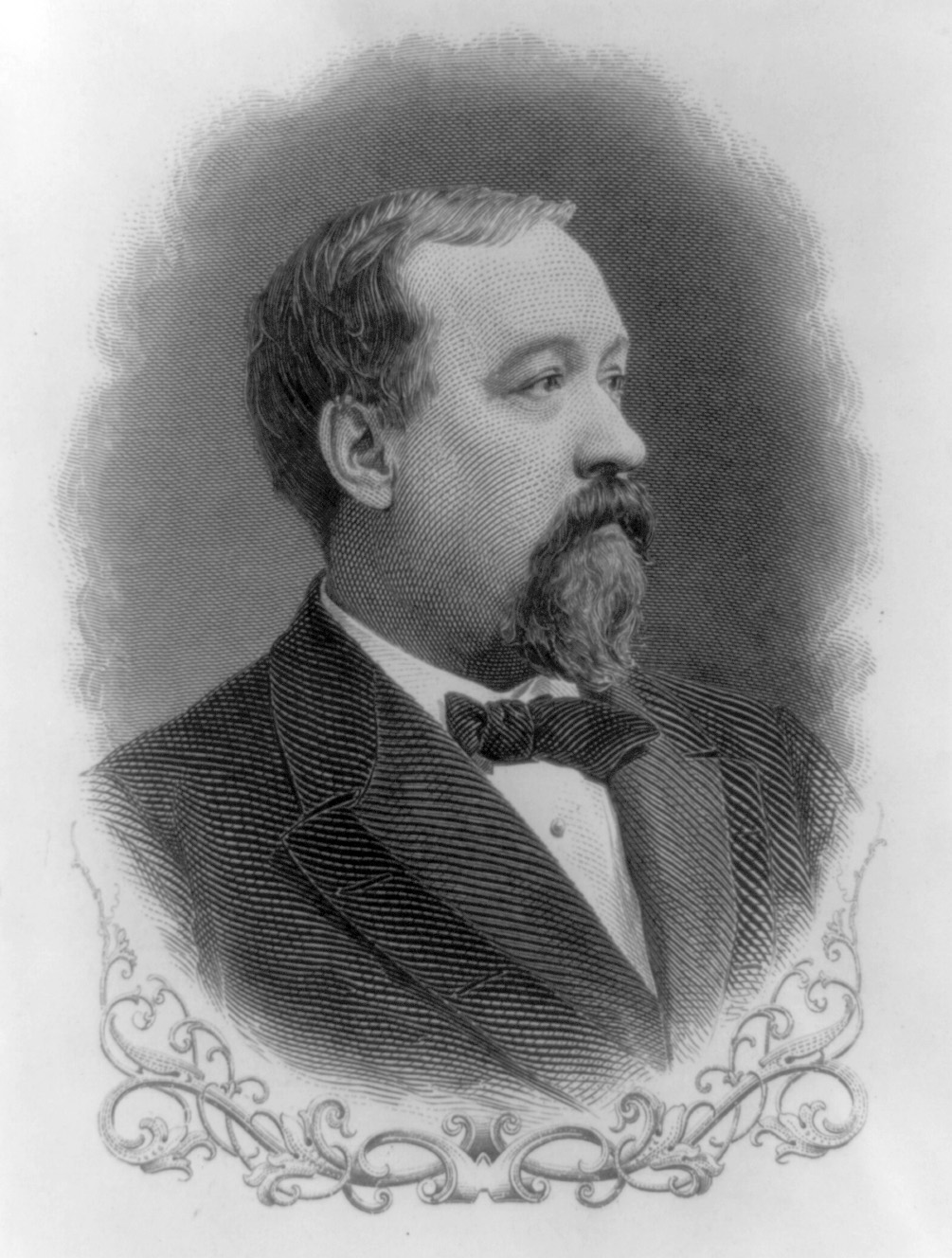
Treasury Secretary
Benjamin Bristow
of Kentucky

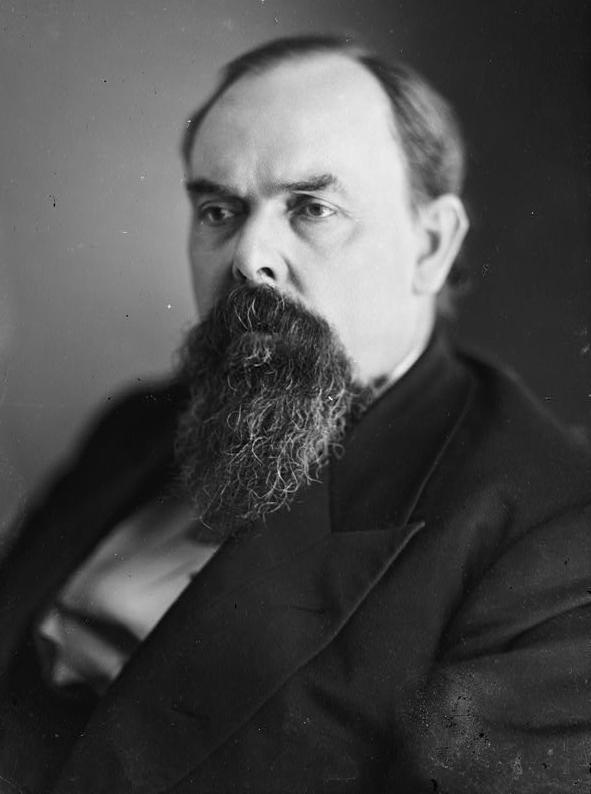
Senator
Oliver P. Morton
of Indiana

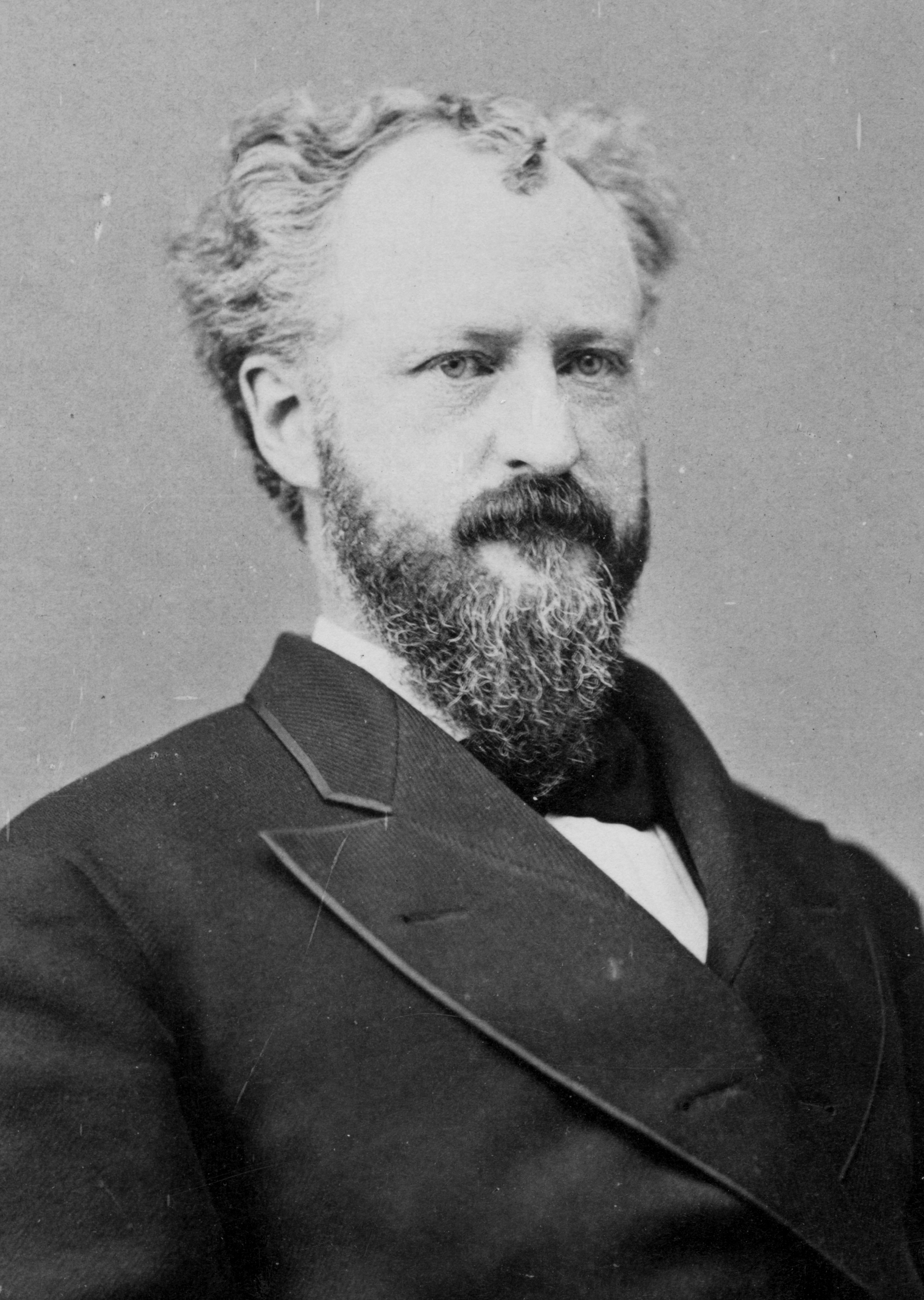
Senator
Roscoe Conkling
of New York

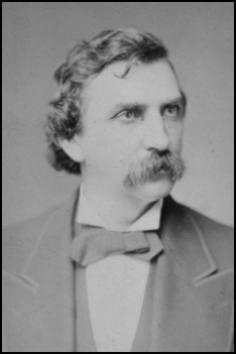
Governor
John F. Hartranft
of Pennsylvania

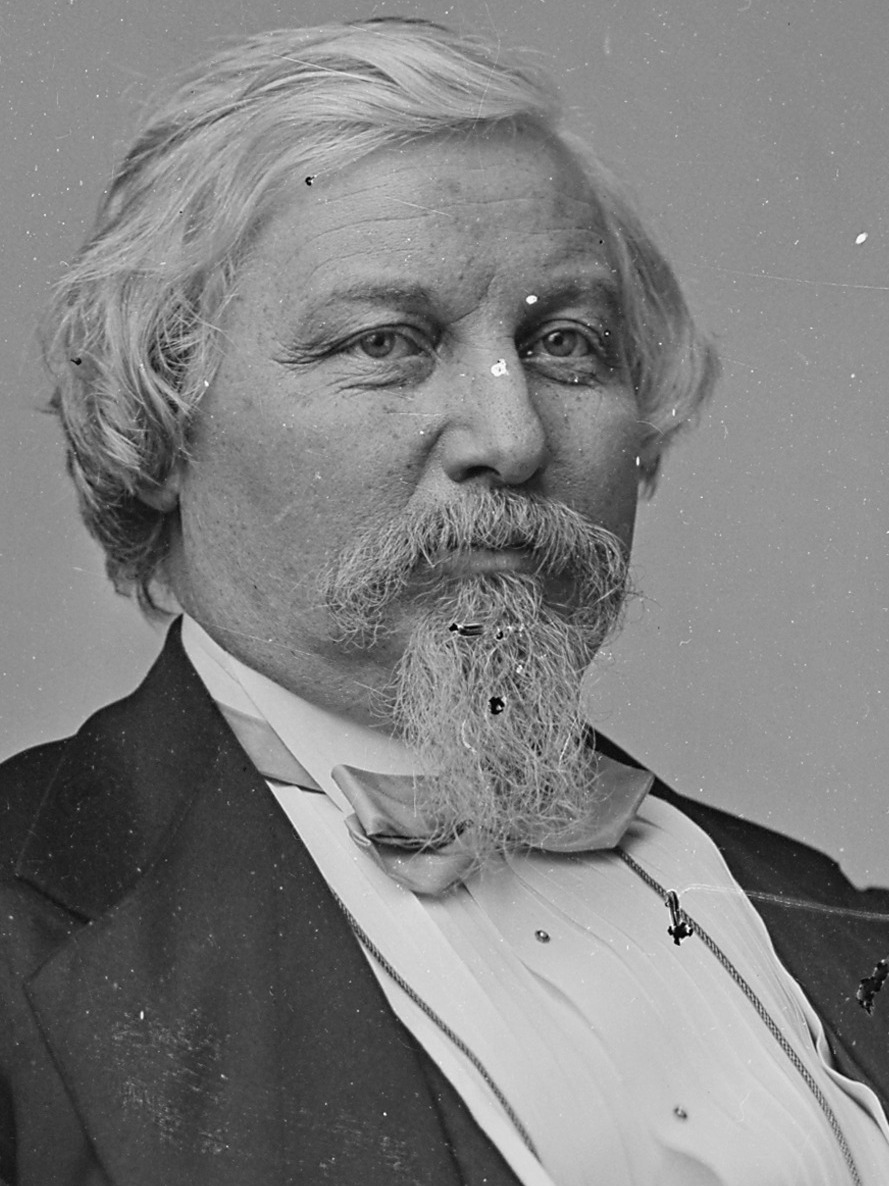
Postmaster General
Marshall Jewell
of Connecticut

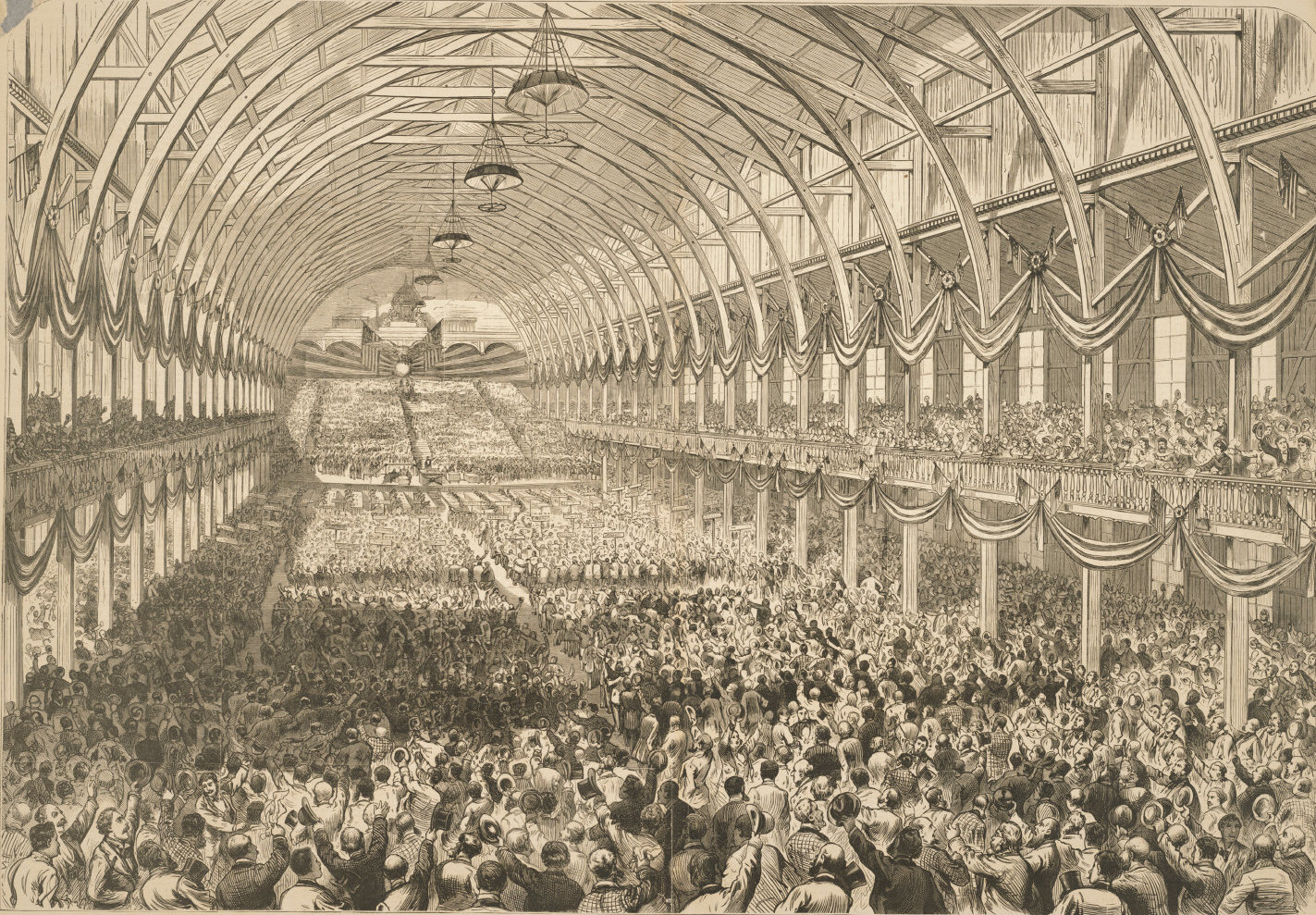
Interior of the Exposition Hall of Cincinnati during the announcement of Rutherford B. Hayes as the party's nominee for president

Blaine led after the first ballot, but had only 285 of the 378 delegates required to secure the nomination. Morton, Bristow, and Conkling each had around 100 delegates, while Hayes and Hartranft each had around 60. The second, third, and fourth ballots saw similar results, but Hayes began to surge on the fifth ballot, passing Morton and Conkling to secure third place after Blaine and Bristow. The sixth ballot saw Blaine rise to 308, but, with the other candidates fading, Hayes continued his surge, moving into second place. After the sixth ballot, the Bristow, Conkling, Morton, and Hartranft supporters withdrew their candidates' names from consideration, leaving Hayes as the sole focus of opposition to Blaine. With the other candidates gone, Hayes won a narrow majority on the seventh ballot and secured the nomination.

Presidential Ballot
| Ballot | 1st | 2nd | 3rd | 4th | 5th | 6th | 7th |
|---|---|---|---|---|---|---|---|
| Hayes | 61 | 64 | 67 | 68 | 104 | 113 | 384 |
| Blaine | 285 | 296 | 293 | 292 | 286 | 308 | 351 |
| Bristow | 113 | 114 | 121 | 126 | 114 | 111 | 21 |
| Morton | 124 | 120 | 113 | 108 | 95 | 85 | 0 |
| Conkling | 99 | 93 | 90 | 84 | 82 | 81 | 0 |
| Hartranft | 58 | 63 | 68 | 71 | 69 | 50 | 0 |
| Jewell | 11 | 0 | 0 | 0 | 0 | 0 | 0 |
| Washburne | 0 | 1 | 1 | 3 | 3 | 4 | 0 |
| Wheeler | 3 | 3 | 2 | 2 | 2 | 2 | 0 |
| Not Voting | 2 | 2 | 1 | 2 | 1 | 2 | 0 |

Presidential Balloting / 3rd Day of Convention (June 16, 1876)

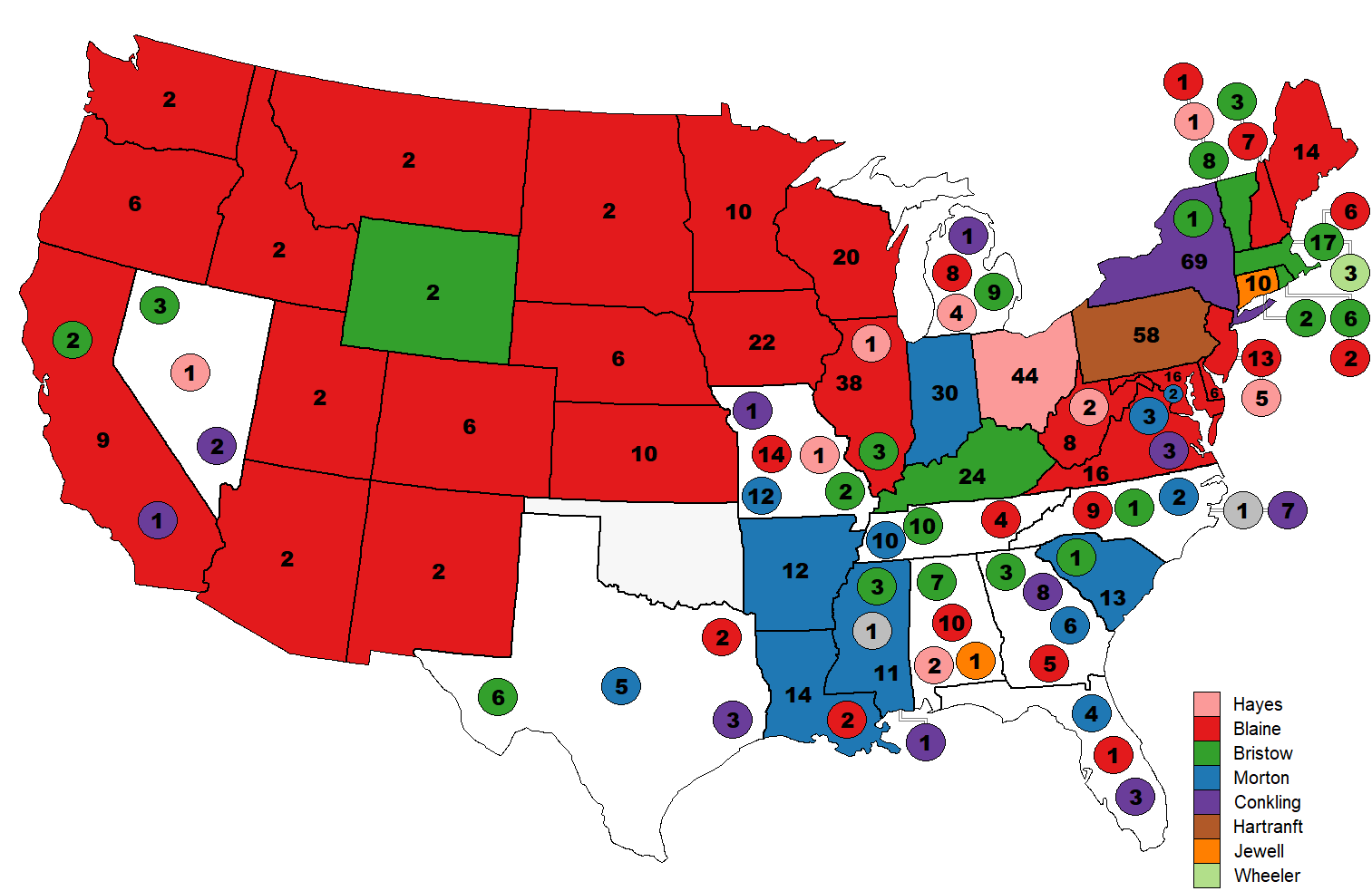
1st
Presidential Ballot

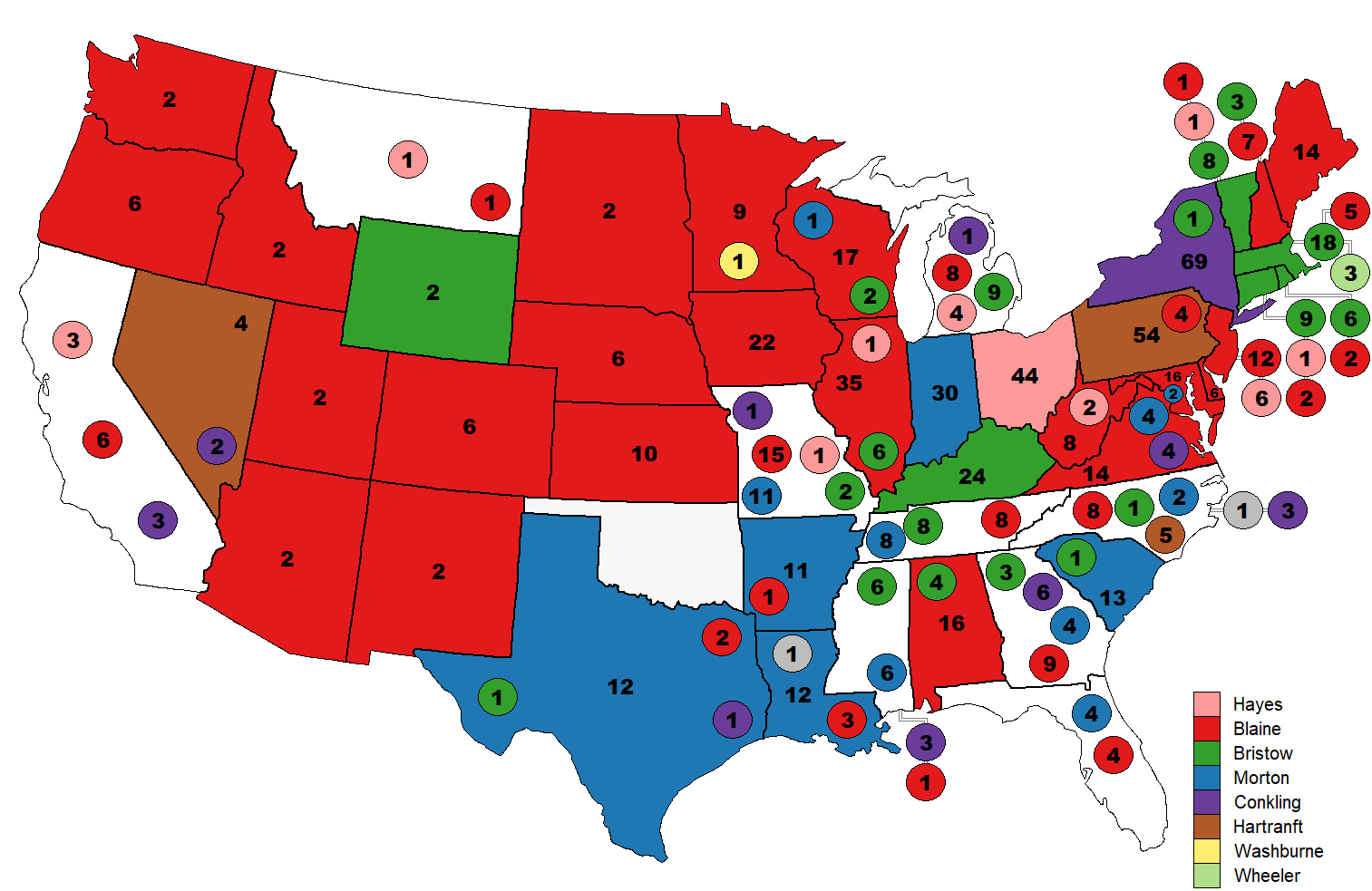
2nd
Presidential Ballot

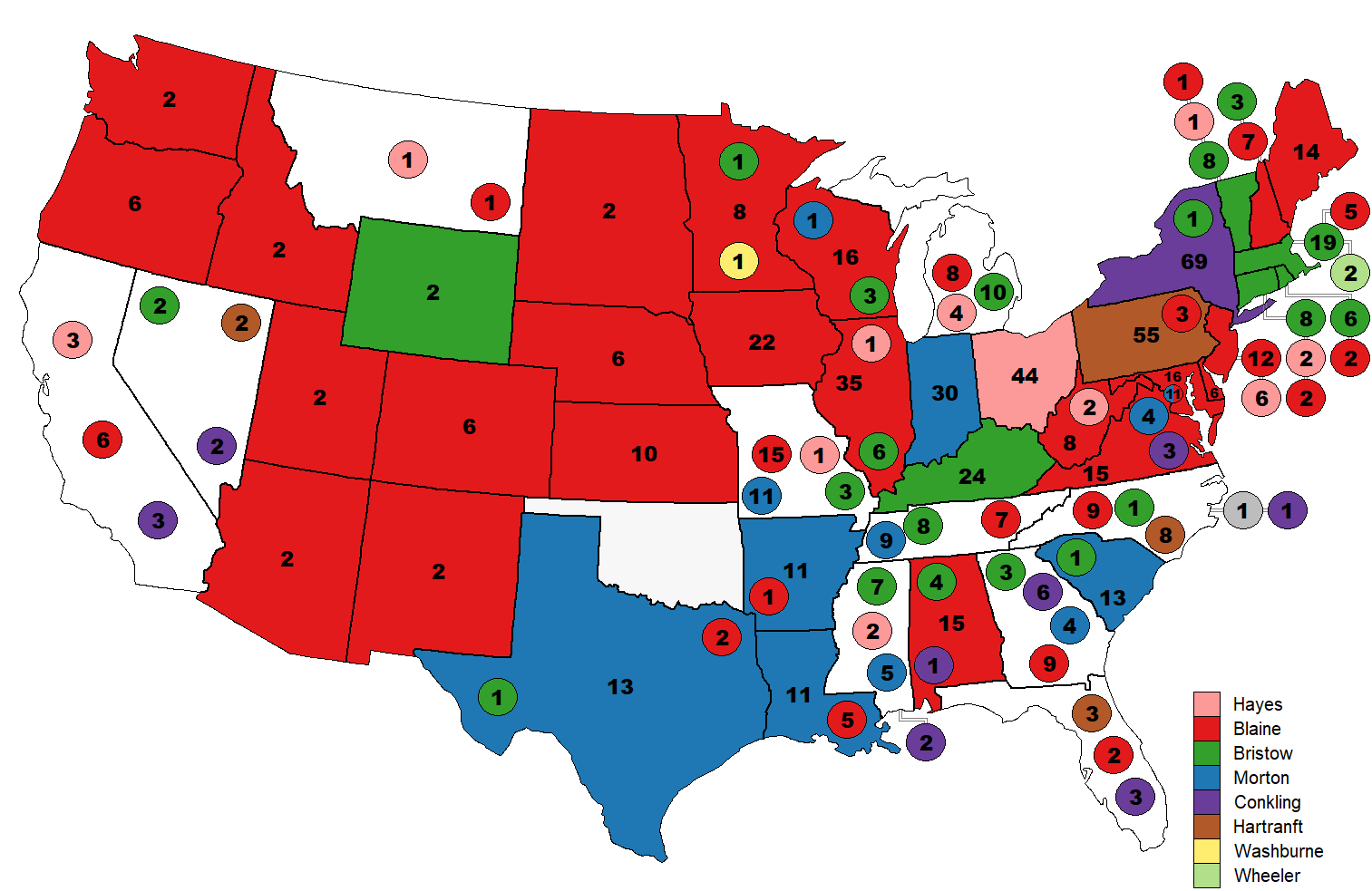
3rd
Presidential Ballot

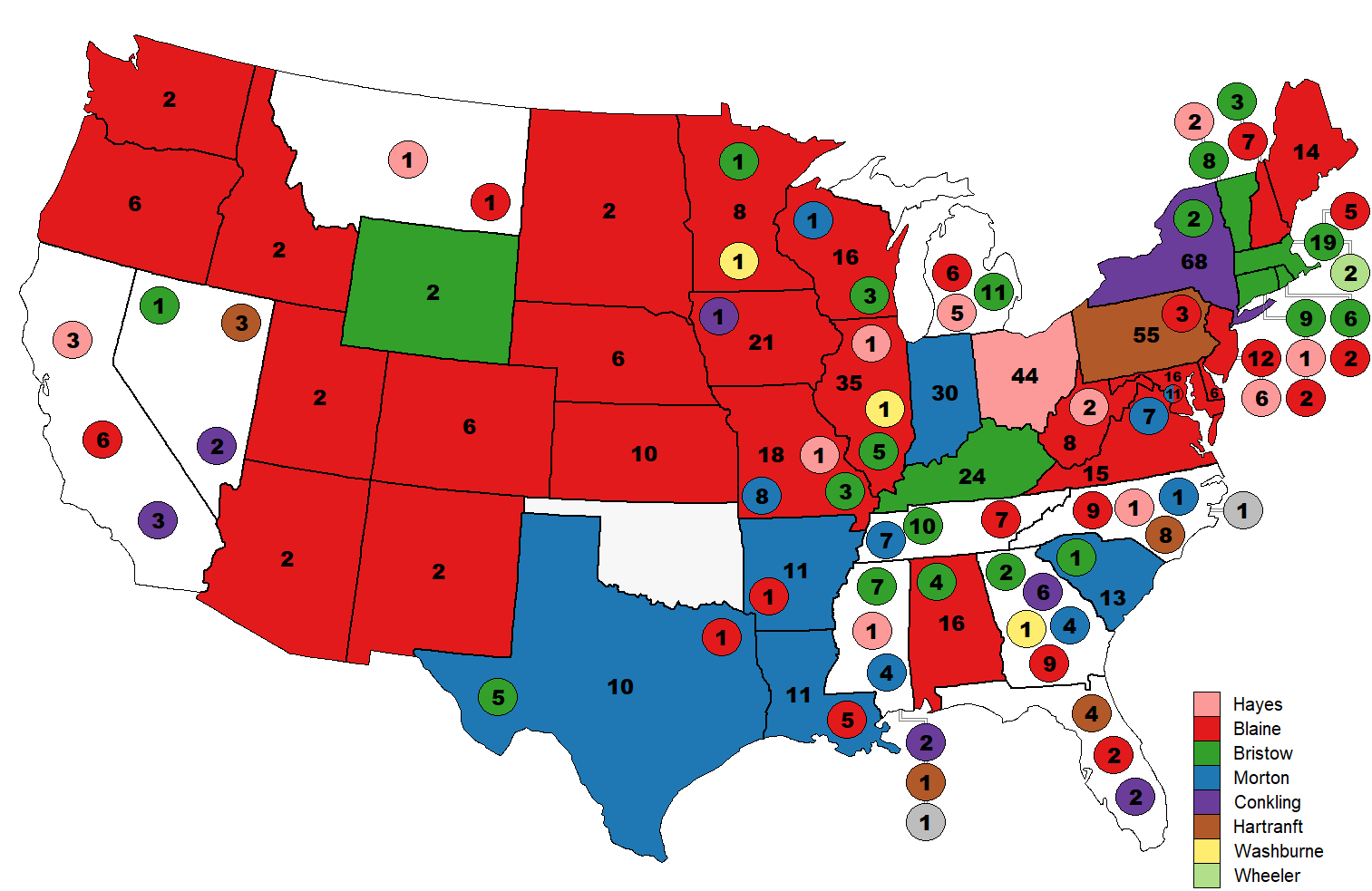
4th
Presidential Ballot

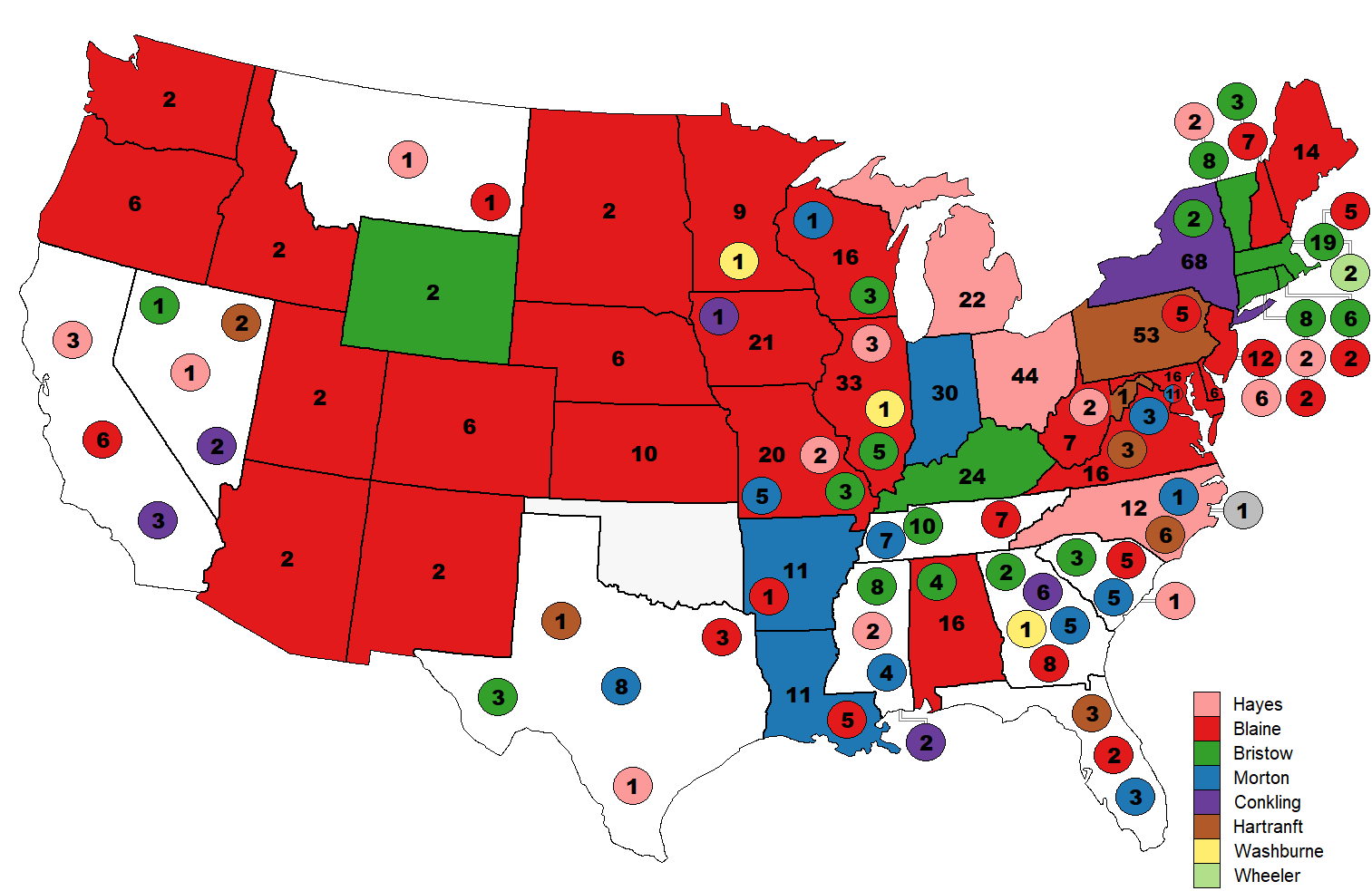
5th
Presidential Ballot

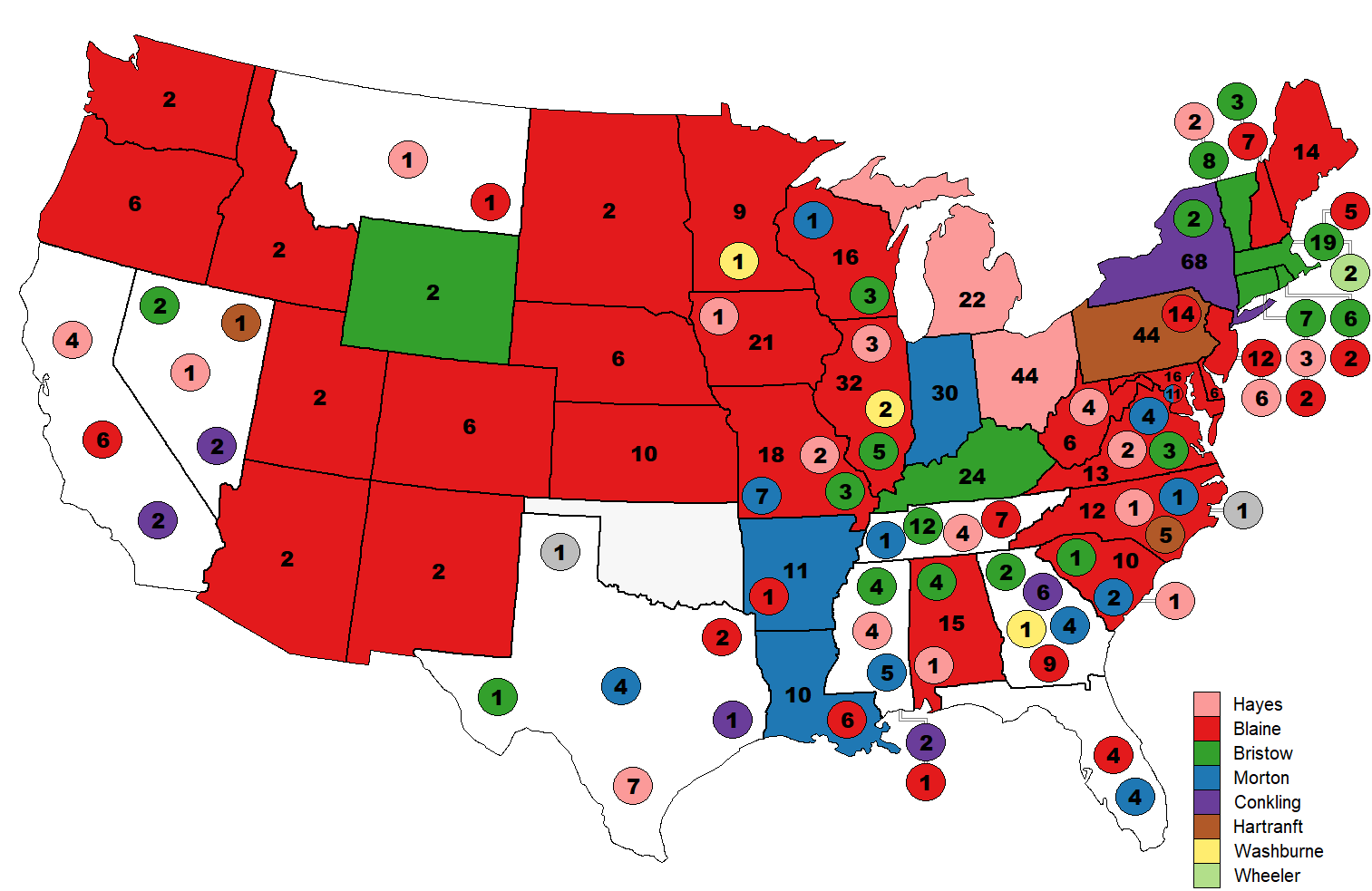
6th
Presidential Ballot

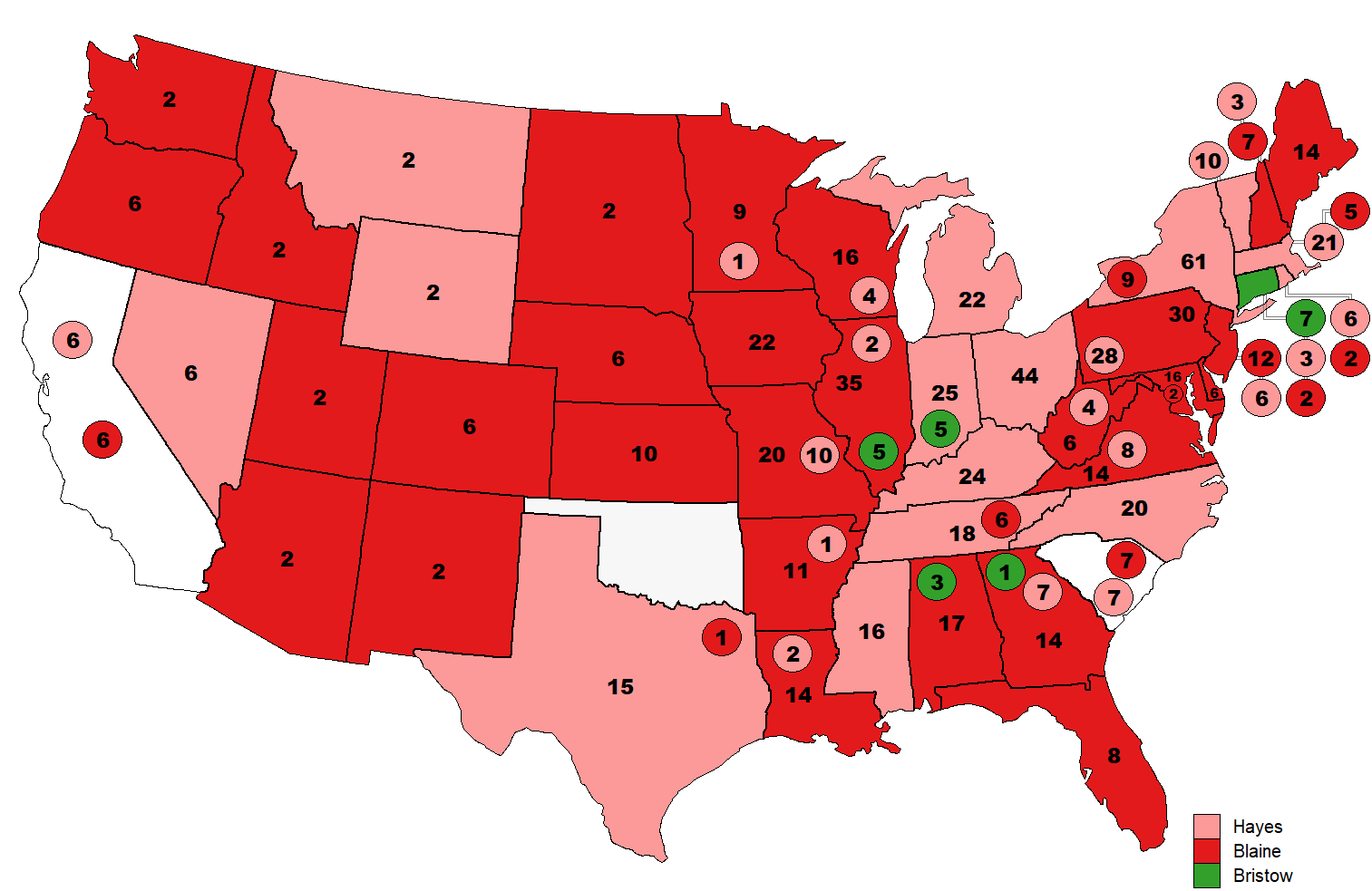
7th
Presidential Ballot

== Vice Presidential nomination ==
=== Vice Presidential candidates ===
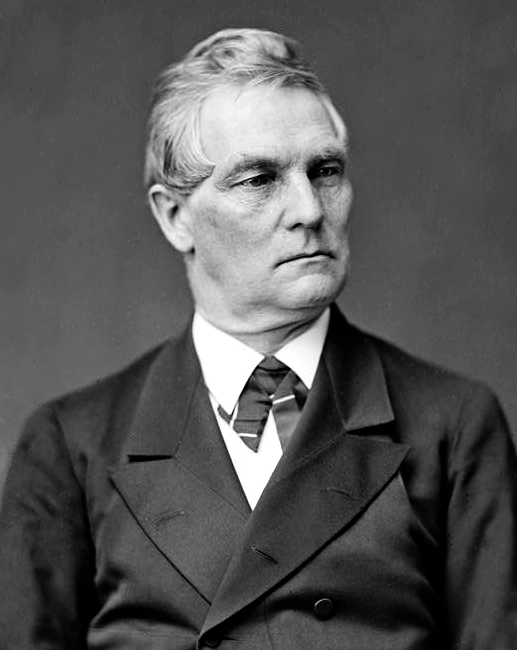
Representative
William A. Wheeler
of New York

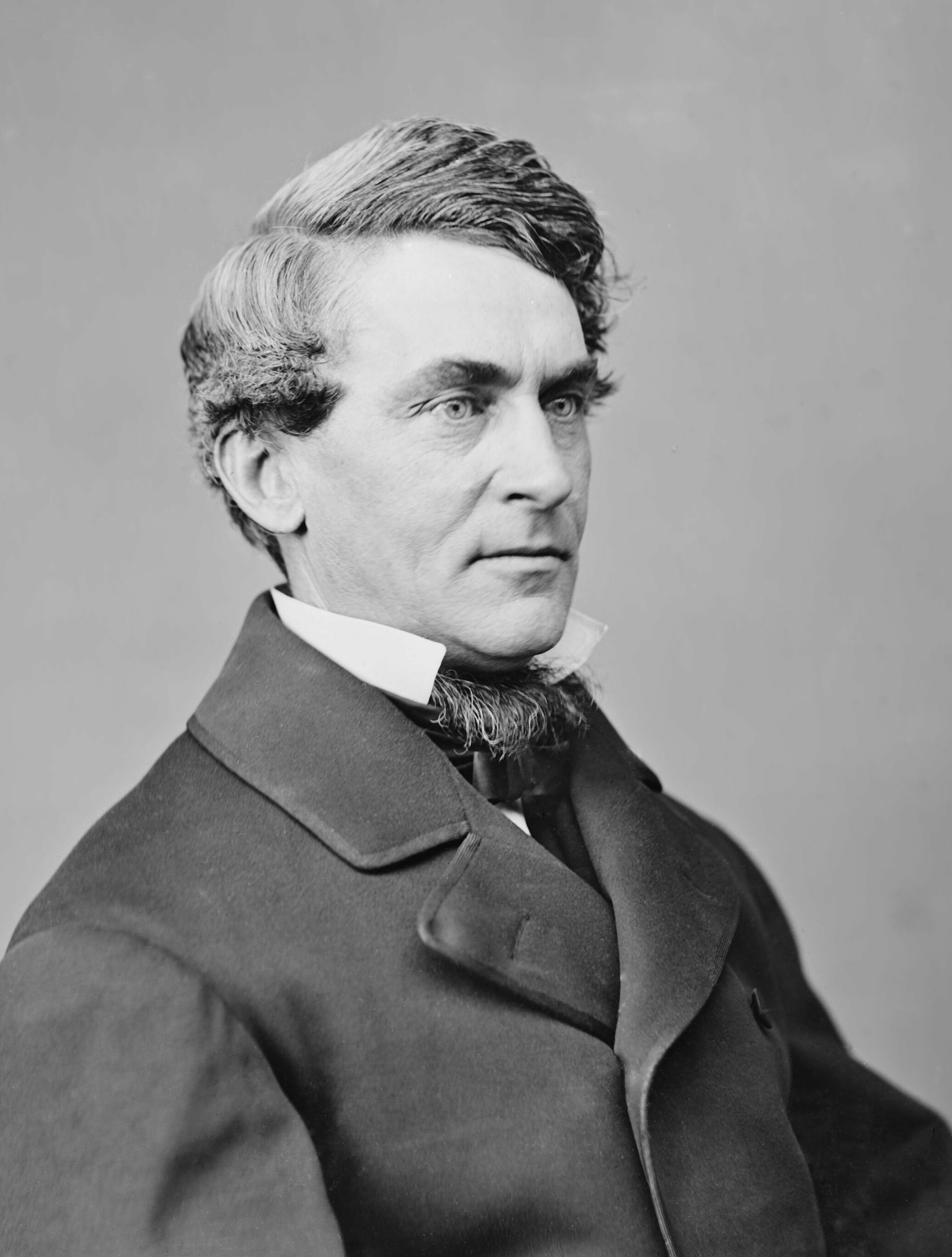
Senator
Frederick Frelinghuysen
of New Jersey

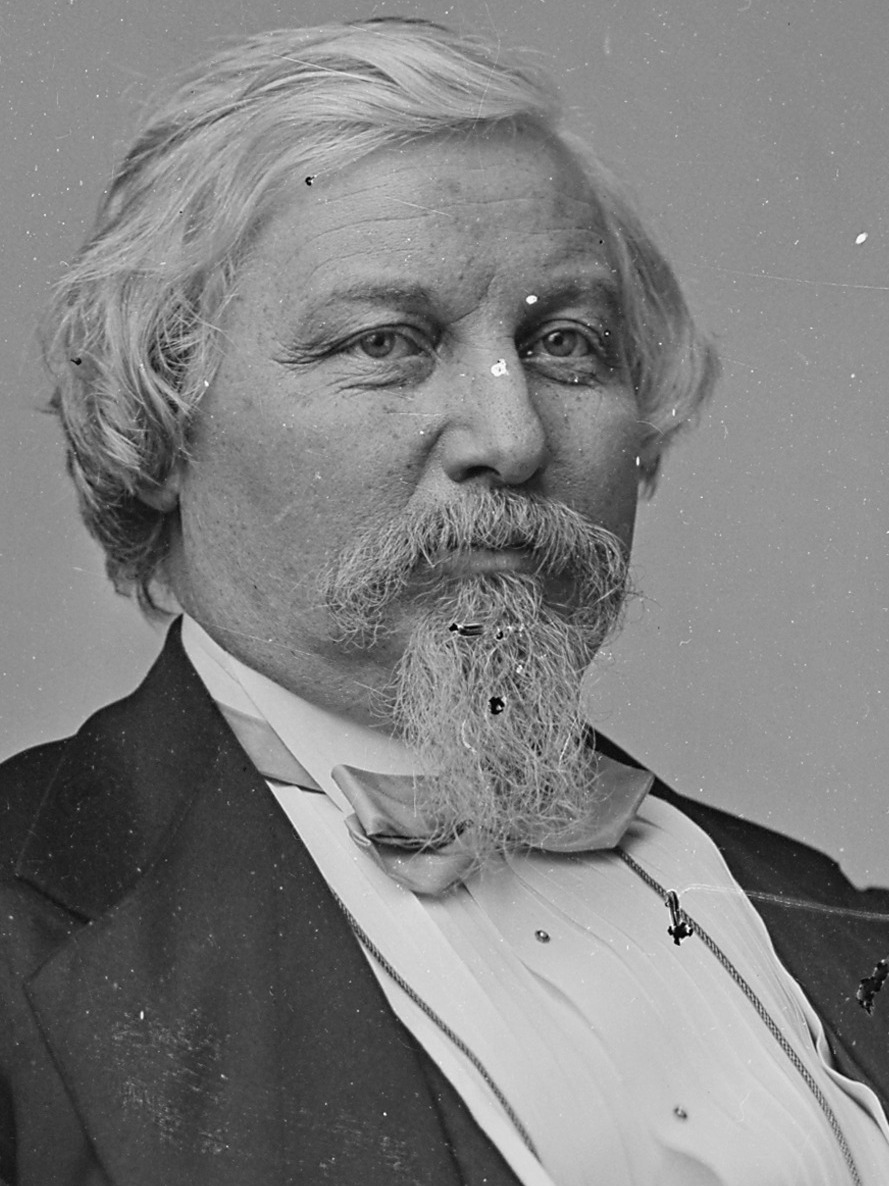
Postmaster General
Marshall Jewell
of Connecticut

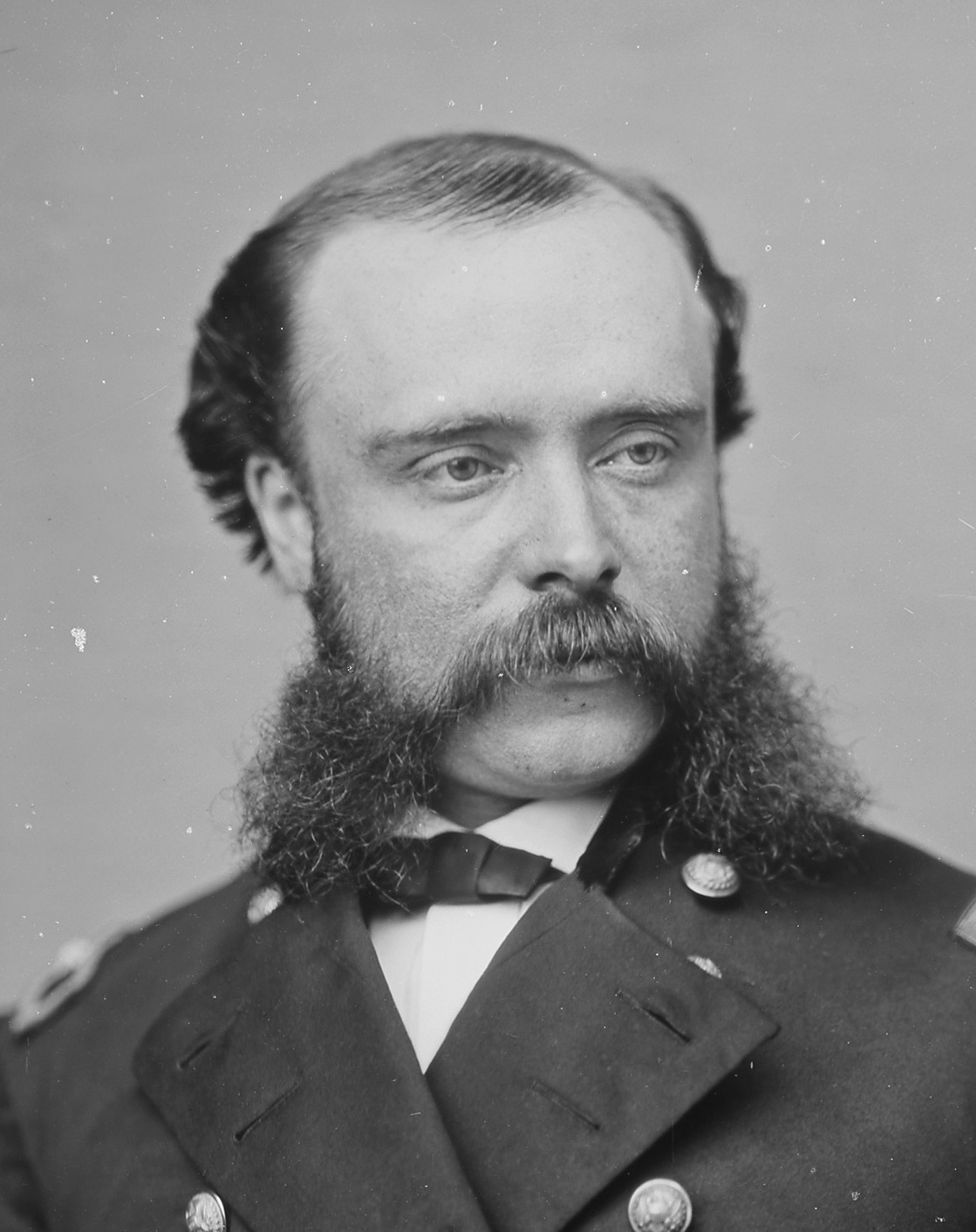
Former Representative
Stewart L. Woodford
of New York
(Declined)

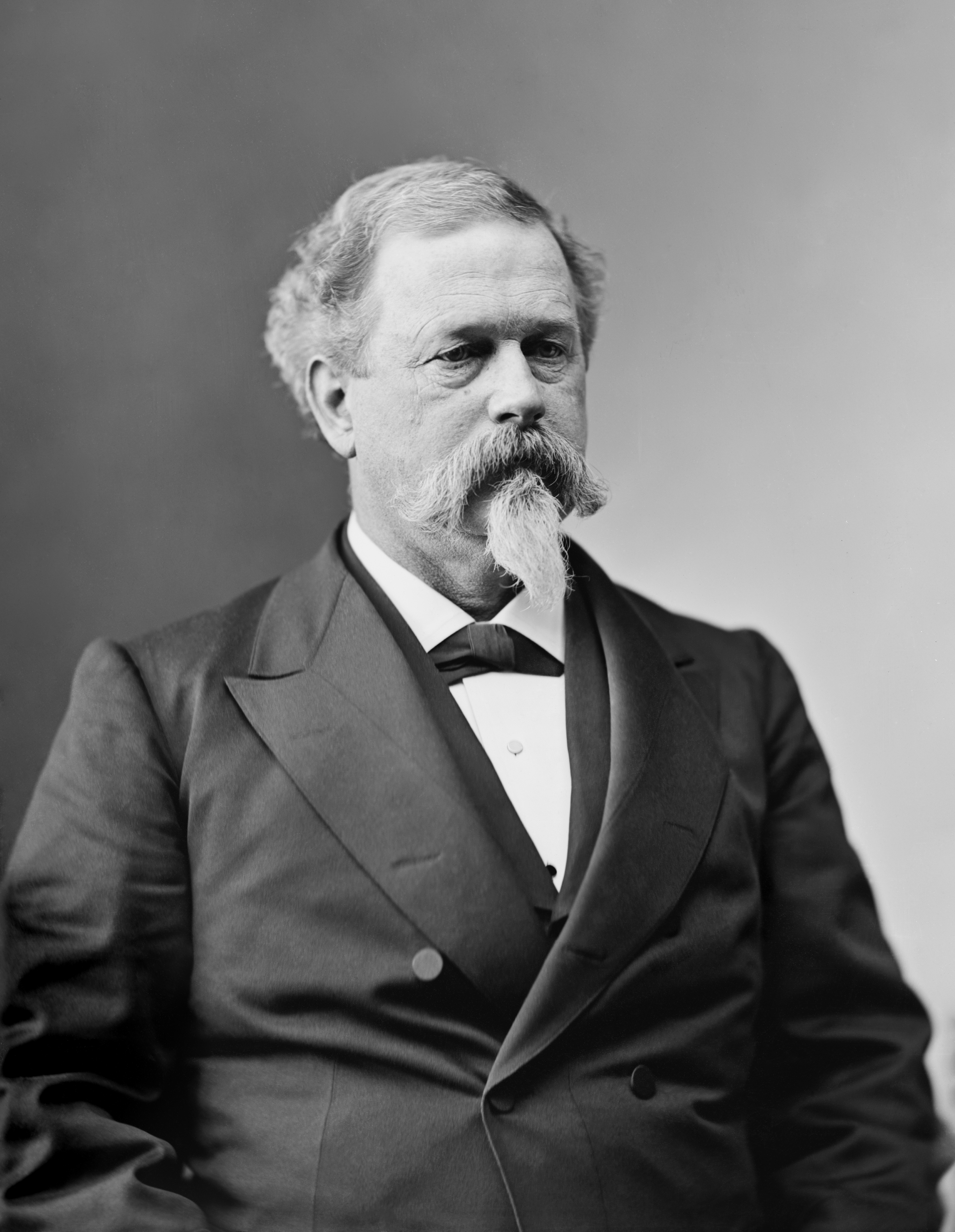
Former Representative
Joseph R. Hawley
of Connecticut

Five names were presented to the convention for the vice presidential nomination. Stewart L. Woodford of New York withdrew his own name from consideration as it was not done at his suggestion.

Representative William A. Wheeler of New York was thirteen votes shy of a majority on a partial first ballot when the rules were suspended so that he could be nominated by acclamation. Wheeler defeated Frederick T. Frelinghuysen of New Jersey, Marshall Jewell and Joseph R. Hawley of Connecticut for the nomination.

Vice Presidential Ballot
| Ballot | 1st (Partial Roll-Call) |
|---|---|
| Wheeler | 366 |
| Frelinghuysen | 89 |
| Jewell | 86 |
| Woodford | 70 |
| Hawley | 25 |
| Not Called | 120 |

Vice Presidential Balloting / 3rd Day of Convention (June 16, 1876)

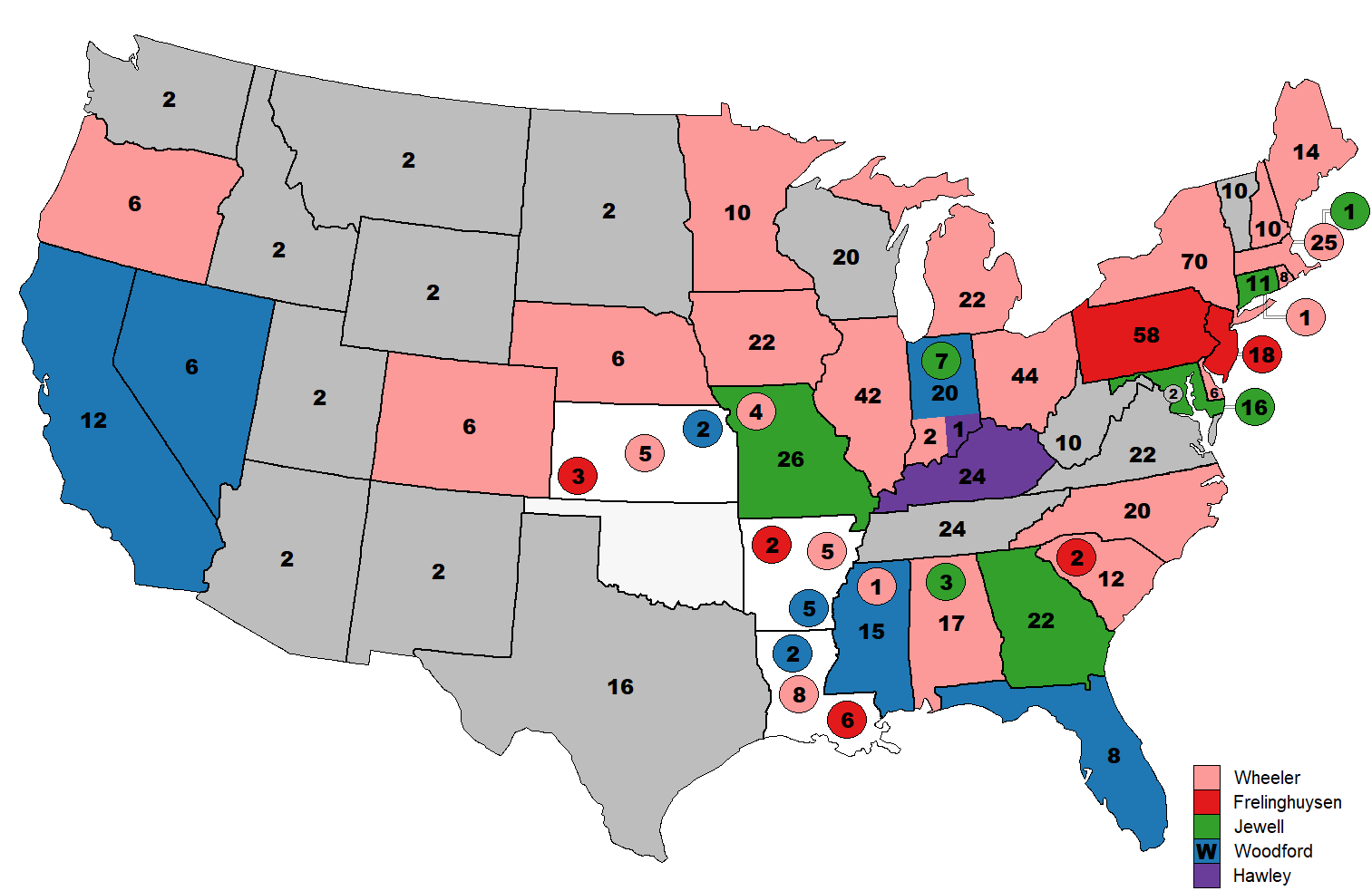
1st
Vice Presidential Ballot
(Partial)

== See also ==
- Bibliography of Rutherford B. Hayes
- Timeline of the Rutherford B. Hayes presidency
- Outline of Rutherford B. Hayes
- History of the United States Republican Party
- List of Republican National Conventions
- United States presidential nominating convention
- 1876 United States presidential election
- 1876 Democratic National Convention

| Preceded by 1872; Philadelphia | Republican National Conventions | Succeeded by 1880; Chicago |
