= Inauguration of Rutherford B. Hayes =

23rd United States presidential inauguration

Presidential inauguration of Rutherford B. Hayes
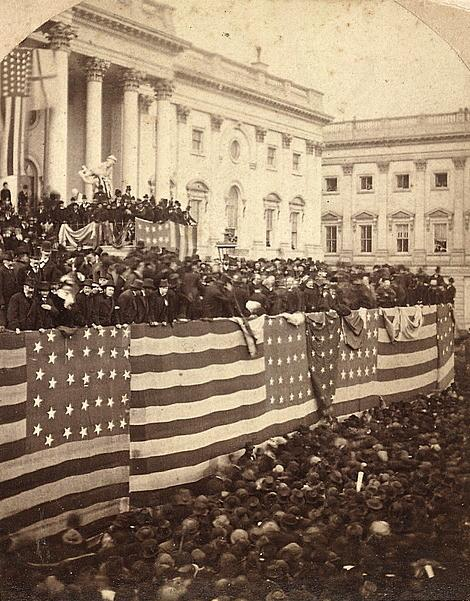
- Rutherford B. Hayes being sworn in as the 19th president of the United States.
- Date: March 3, 1877; 149 years ago (private); March 5, 1877 (public)
- Location: White House (private) United States Capitol, Washington, D.C. (public)
- Participants: Rutherford B. Hayes; 19th president of the United States — Assuming office Morrison Waite; Chief Justice of the United States — Administering oath William A. Wheeler; 19th vice president of the United States — Assuming office Thomas W. Ferry; President pro tempore of the United States Senate — Administering oath

The inauguration of Rutherford B. Hayes as the 19th president of the United States took place publicly on Monday, March 5, 1877, at the East Portico of the United States Capitol in Washington, D.C. This was the 23rd inauguration and marked the commencement of the only four-year term of Rutherford B. Hayes as president and William A. Wheeler as vice president.

As March 4, 1877, fell on a Sunday, Hayes was sworn in at the Red Room of the White House on March 3, becoming the first president to take the presidential oath of office in the White House. This ceremony was held in secret under tight security, as the previous year's election had been so bitterly divisive to the point that outgoing President Ulysses S. Grant feared an insurrection by Samuel J. Tilden's supporters, while assuring any Democratic Party attempt to hijack a public inauguration ceremony would fail. Under the gentlemen's agreement which came to be known as the Compromise of 1877, Hayes' inauguration would mark the beginning of the end of the Reconstruction era. In his inaugural speech he said:

Let me assure my countrymen of the Southern States that it is my earnest desire to regard and promote their truest interest--the interests of the white and of the colored people both and equally--and to put forth my best efforts in behalf of a civil policy which will forever wipe out in our political affairs the color line and the distinction between North and South, to the end that we may have not merely a united North or a united South, but a united country.

Having been sworn in already in private, Hayes took the oath again publicly two days later, and served until March 4, 1881. Hayes' best known quotation, "He serves his party best who serves his country best," is from his inaugural address.

== See also ==
- Presidency of Rutherford B. Hayes
- 1876 United States presidential election
- Bibliography of Rutherford B. Hayes
- Timeline of the Rutherford B. Hayes presidency
- Outline of Rutherford B. Hayes
