= 1879 State of the Union Address =

Speech by US President Rutherford B. Hayes

- Date: December 1, 1879
- Venue: House Chamber, United States Capitol
- Location: Washington, D.C.; 38°53′23″N 77°00′32″W
- Type: State of the Union Address
- Participants: Rutherford B. Hayes; William A. Wheeler; Samuel J. Randall
- Format: Written
- Previous: 1878 State of the Union Address
- Next: 1880 State of the Union Address

The 1879 State of the Union address was delivered by the 19th president of the United States, Rutherford B. Hayes, to the 46th United States Congress on December 1, 1879, in the House Chamber of the United States Capitol in Washington, D.C. Speaker of the House Samuel J. Randall and Vice President William A. Wheeler presided over the joint session.

== Themes ==
President Hayes began his address by highlighting the successful implementation of the Resumption Act of 1875, which had restored specie payments. He noted the economic revival following the stabilization of currency, with increased foreign demand for American goods and a reduction in the public debt. Hayes emphasized the need for further legislation to enable the refunding of maturing debt at lower interest rates and recommended suspending silver coinage to maintain monetary stability.

Addressing domestic issues, Hayes reiterated his opposition to the partisan spoils system in government appointments and advocated for civil service reform based on merit. He proposed competitive examinations and measures to curb political interference in the civil service. He also discussed progress in Indian policy, endorsing land allotments, educational initiatives, and individual land ownership as pathways to integrating Native Americans into American society.

In foreign affairs, Hayes reported peaceful relations with most nations and highlighted efforts to resolve disputes with Great Britain over fisheries and to facilitate international trade. He referenced American participation in the Australian exhibitions and discussed diplomatic relations with China, Japan, and Latin American nations. The address also detailed efforts to improve trade and communication infrastructure, including the development of an interoceanic canal.

Hayes touched on infrastructure needs in the District of Columbia, including the reclamation of marshlands along the Potomac River and expanded accommodations for the Library of Congress. He praised advancements in education and recommended national support for public schools, particularly in the District.

The address concluded with a call for continued economic and social progress, emphasizing unity, the enforcement of voting rights, and the importance of prudent governance.

| Preceded by 1878 State of the Union Address | State of the Union addresses 1879 | Succeeded by 1880 State of the Union Address |
