= 1881 State of the Union Address =

Speech by US President Chester A. Arthur

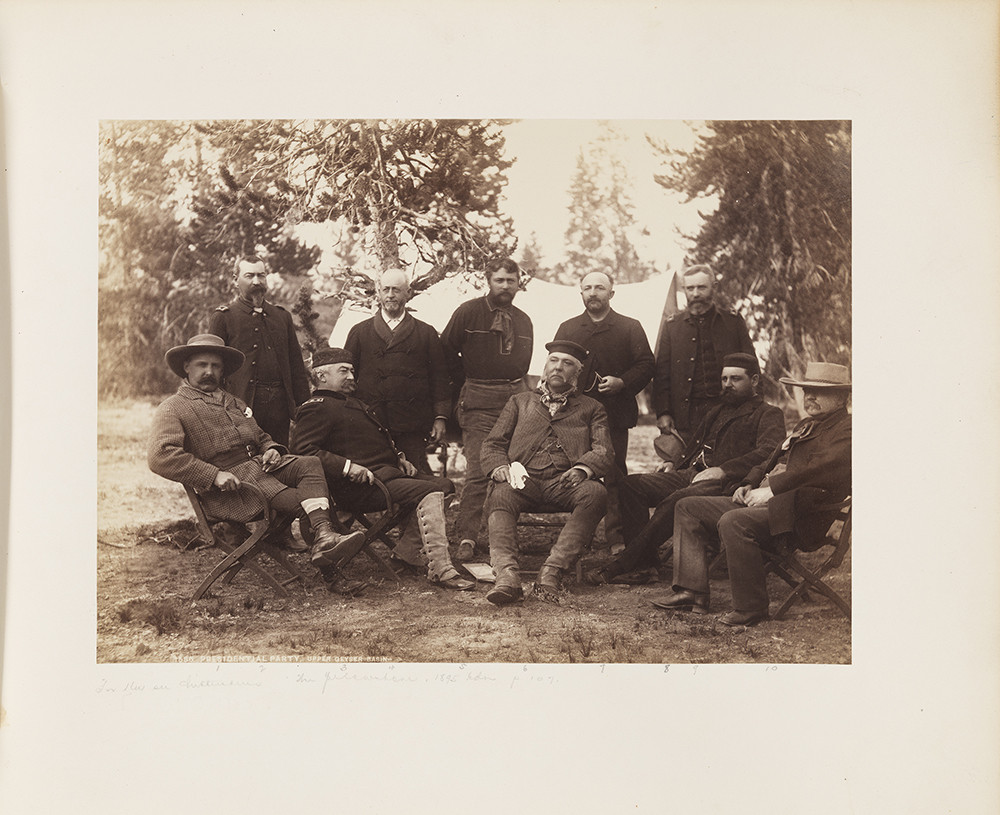
- Chester Arthur with party at Yellowstone National Park, included is Robert Todd Lincoln.
- Date: December 6, 1881
- Venue: House Chamber, United States Capitol
- Location: Washington, D.C.; 38°53′23″N 77°00′32″W
- Type: State of the Union Address
- Participants: Chester A. Arthur; David Davis; J. Warren Keifer
- Format: Written
- Previous: 1880 State of the Union Address
- Next: 1882 State of the Union Address

The 1881 State of the Union address was delivered by Chester A. Arthur, the 21st president of the United States, on December 6, 1881. This address, Arthur's first, came shortly after the assassination of President James A. Garfield, which he described as an "appalling calamity" that profoundly affected the nation. Arthur contrasted the sorrow of Garfield's death with the nation's continued prosperity, citing bountiful harvests, thriving industries, and peaceful foreign relations. "To that mysterious exercise of His will which has taken from us the loved and illustrious citizen... we bow in sorrow and submission," Arthur said, highlighting Garfield's legacy as a source of national unity and admiration.

Arthur addressed several foreign policy and domestic matters. He noted the resolution of the Fortune Bay claims with Great Britain and ongoing negotiations on an international copyright convention. He praised the participation of American exhibitors in global expositions in Melbourne and Sydney as examples of growing national competitiveness. Domestically, Arthur emphasized the need for legislation to better manage Native American affairs, suppress lawlessness on the frontier, and revise internal revenue laws to reduce taxation burdens. He also highlighted the importance of public health measures, education reform, and the continued reduction of the national debt as priorities for his administration.

Preceded by 1880 State of the Union Address	State of the Union addresses 1881	Succeeded by 1882 State of the Union Address
