= 1878 State of the Union Address =

Speech by US President Rutherford B. Hayes

- Date: December 2, 1878
- Venue: House Chamber, United States Capitol
- Location: Washington, D.C.; 38°53′23″N 77°00′32″W
- Type: State of the Union Address
- Participants: Rutherford B. Hayes; William A. Wheeler; Samuel J. Randall
- Format: Written
- Previous: 1877 State of the Union Address
- Next: 1879 State of the Union Address

The 1878 State of the Union address was delivered by the 19th president of the United States, Rutherford B. Hayes, to the 45th United States Congress on December 2, 1878, in the House Chamber of the United States Capitol in Washington, D.C. Presiding over the joint session were Speaker of the House Samuel J. Randall and Vice President William A. Wheeler.

President Hayes opened his address with gratitude for the nation's prosperity, noting improved public credit, abundant harvests, and a revival of manufacturing industries. However, he acknowledged the devastation caused by the 1878 yellow fever epidemic, which claimed approximately 20,000 lives in the Southern United States. Hayes praised the national response, including voluntary relief efforts and government aid, and recommended Congress take steps to establish a "national sanitary administration" to better handle future health crises.

Hayes emphasized the importance of civil rights enforcement, particularly the protection of voting rights for African Americans in the South. While the Fifteenth Amendment guaranteed suffrage, Hayes noted that voter suppression and irregularities persisted in states like Louisiana and South Carolina. He vowed to use the powers of the executive branch to address these violations and urged Congress to ensure free and fair elections.

The President highlighted peaceful relations with foreign nations, including the conclusion of the Paris Universal Exposition and discussions on bimetallism at an international monetary conference. He also discussed improved relations with Mexico, the establishment of a Chinese legation in Washington, and ongoing efforts to address boundary disputes in South America.

On domestic issues, Hayes spoke about the reduction of the public debt and the resumption of specie payments, which he expected to stabilize the economy. He addressed challenges in the Indian service, recommending educational programs for Native Americans and the establishment of mounted auxiliaries to maintain order. He called for forest conservation, improved agricultural support, and additional investment in public education. Hayes also urged infrastructure improvements in Washington, D.C., including the reclamation of tidal flats and the expansion of library facilities at the Capitol.

Hayes concluded with an optimistic outlook for national unity, economic recovery, and the enduring strength of American democratic institutions.

Preceded by 1877 State of the Union Address	State of the Union addresses 1878	Succeeded by 1879 State of the Union Address
