= 1880 State of the Union Address =

Speech by US President Rutherford B. Hayes

1879 State of the Union Address
- Date: December 6, 1880
- Venue: House Chamber, United States Capitol
- Location: Washington, D.C.; 38°53′23″N 77°00′32″W
- Type: State of the Union Address
- Participants: Rutherford B. Hayes; William A. Wheeler; Samuel J. Randall
- Format: Written
- Previous: 1879 State of the Union Address
- Next: 1881 State of the Union Address

The 1880 State of the Union Address was written by Rutherford B. Hayes, the 19th United States president. In it he said these words,

Continued opposition to the full and free enjoyment of the rights of citizenship conferred upon the colored people by the recent amendments to the Constitution still prevails in several of the late slaveholding States.

It was given on December 6, 1880, to both houses of the 46th United States Congress. The President advocated for general education for all peoples by saying:

Whatever Government can fairly do to promote free popular education ought to be done. Wherever general education is found, peace, virtue, and social order prevail and civil and religious liberty are secure

On foreign policy, the President advocated for submarine communication cables to be laid from San Francisco to Pacific nations such as Japan and Australia to facilitate commerce.

Preceded by 1879 State of the Union Address	State of the Union addresses 1880	Succeeded by 1881 State of the Union Address
