= 1877 State of the Union Address =

Speech by US President Rutherford B. Hayes

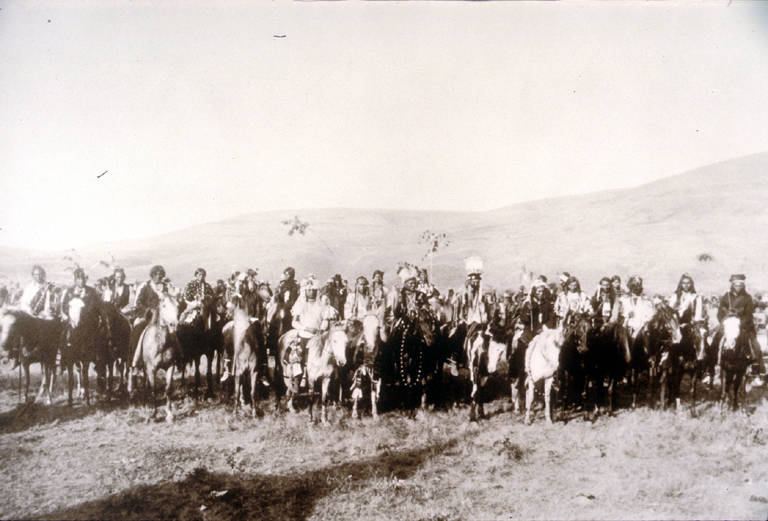
- Nez Perce group known as "Chief Joseph's Band", Lapwai, Idaho, spring, 1877
- Date: December 3, 1877
- Venue: House Chamber, United States Capitol
- Location: Washington, D.C.; 38°53′23″N 77°00′32″W
- Type: State of the Union Address
- Participants: Rutherford B. Hayes; William A. Wheeler; Samuel J. Randall
- Format: Written
- Previous: 1876 State of the Union Address
- Next: 1878 State of the Union Address

The 1877 State of the Union Address was written by the 19th president, Rutherford B. Hayes. It was given on Monday, December 3, to both houses of the 45th United States Congress. In it, he said, "There has been a general reestablishment of order and of the orderly administration of justice. Instances of remaining lawlessness have become of rare occurrence; political turmoil and turbulence have disappeared; useful industries have been resumed; public credit in the Southern States has been greatly strengthened, and the encouraging benefits of a revival of commerce between the sections of the country lately embroiled in civil war are fully enjoyed." He gave this address right after troops were withdrawn from the South. The Reconstruction Era ended in March 1877, and the Southern United States were freed from Republican control.

On foreign policy matters the President mentions good relations with the Empire of Russia and Turkey in particular. Additionally the address notes the recent Mexican revolution which installed Porfirio Diaz as President.

On domestic matters the President noted the successful war waged against the Nez Perce tribe.

Preceded by 1876 State of the Union Address	State of the Union addresses 1877	Succeeded by 1878 State of the Union Address
