= William A. Wheeler =

Vice President of the United States from 1877 to 1881

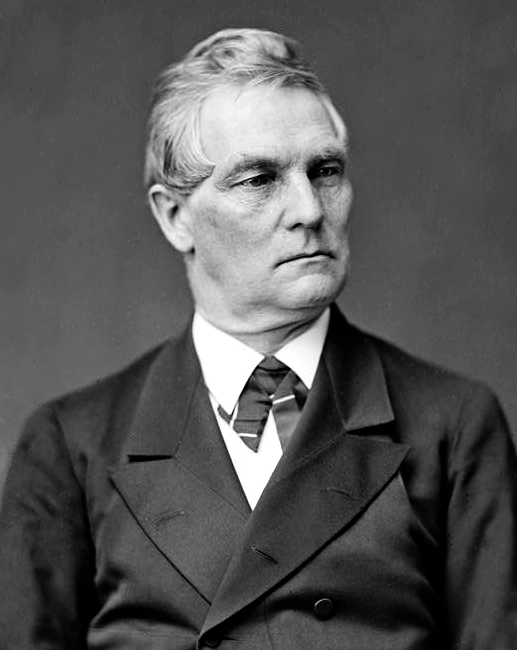
- Wheeler in 1877

19th Vice President of the United States
- In office March 4, 1877 – March 4, 1881
- President: Rutherford B. Hayes
- Preceded by: Henry Wilson
- Succeeded by: Chester A. Arthur

Member of the U.S. House of Representatives from New York
- In office March 4, 1869 – March 3, 1877
- Preceded by: Calvin T. Hulburd
- Succeeded by: Amaziah B. James
- Constituency: 17th district (1869–1873); 18th district (1873–1875); 19th district (1875–1877)
- In office March 4, 1861 – March 3, 1863
- Preceded by: George Palmer
- Succeeded by: Orlando Kellogg
- Constituency: 16th district

Member of the New York Senate from the 17th district
- In office January 1, 1858 – December 31, 1859
- Preceded by: Joseph H. Ramsey
- Succeeded by: Charles C. Montgomery

Member of the New York State Assembly from the Franklin County district
- In office January 1, 1850 – December 31, 1851
- Preceded by: George Gove
- Succeeded by: Darius Lawrence

Personal details
- Born: William Almon Wheeler; June 30, 1819 Malone, New York, U.S.
- Died: June 4, 1887 (aged 67) Malone, New York, U.S.
- Resting place: Morningside Cemetery, Malone, New York, U.S.
- Party: Whig; Republican
- Spouse: Mary King (m. 1845; died 1876)
- Parents: Almon Wheeler; Eliza Woodworth
- Education: University of Vermont (BA)
- Profession: Attorney

William Almon Wheeler (June 30, 1819 – June 4, 1887) was an American politician and attorney who served as the 19th vice president of the United States from 1877 to 1881 under President Rutherford B. Hayes. A member of the Republican Party, he previously served as a United States representative from New York from 1861 to 1863 and 1869 to 1877.

Born in Malone, New York, Wheeler pursued a legal career after attending the University of Vermont. After serving in various local positions, he won election to the New York State Legislature. He served in Congress from 1861 to 1863 and from 1869 to 1877. He was widely respected for his integrity and refused a salary increase after Congress passed an 1873 pay raise that he opposed.

After the 1876 Republican National Convention settled on Rutherford B. Hayes as the party's presidential nominee after seven ballots, the delegates nominated Wheeler for vice president. Nominated by Congressman Luke P. Poland, Wheeler surged into an early lead over Frederick T. Frelinghuysen, Marshall Jewell, and Stewart L. Woodford to clinch the nomination on the first ballot. Wheeler was nominated because he was popular among his colleagues and had worked to avoid making enemies in Congress. In addition, as a resident of the populous Eastern state of New York, he provided geographical balance to the ticket, since Hayes was from the populous Midwest state of Ohio. The Republican ticket prevailed in the contentious 1876 presidential election, though they lost the popular vote. Though they had not known each other before the convention, Wheeler and Hayes got along amicably while in office. They chose not to seek second terms, and Wheeler returned to Malone, New York, after the end of his term. He died in 1887 and was buried at Morningside Cemetery in Malone.

== Early life and career ==
William Almon Wheeler was born in Malone, New York, and attended Franklin Academy and the University of Vermont, although monetary concerns forced him to drop out without graduating. Wheeler received the honorary degrees of Master of Arts from Dartmouth College in 1865 and LL.D. from the University of Vermont (1867) and Union College (1877). In 1876, he received his Bachelor of Arts degree from the University of Vermont "as in course", making him a graduate of the class of 1842. In 1845, he married Mary King (1828–1876).

He studied law with Asa Hascall, a Malone attorney and politician who served as town supervisor, justice of the peace, district attorney, and member of the New York State Assembly. Wheeler was admitted to the bar in 1845, and practiced in Malone. He was District Attorney of Franklin County from 1846 to 1849. He was a member of the Assembly (Franklin County) in 1850 and 1851; and of the New York State Senate (17th D.) in 1858 and 1859.

He was elected as a Republican to the 37th United States Congress, holding office from March 4, 1861, to March 3, 1863. He was elected to the 41st, 42nd, 43rd and 44th United States Congresses, holding office from March 4, 1869, to March 3, 1877.

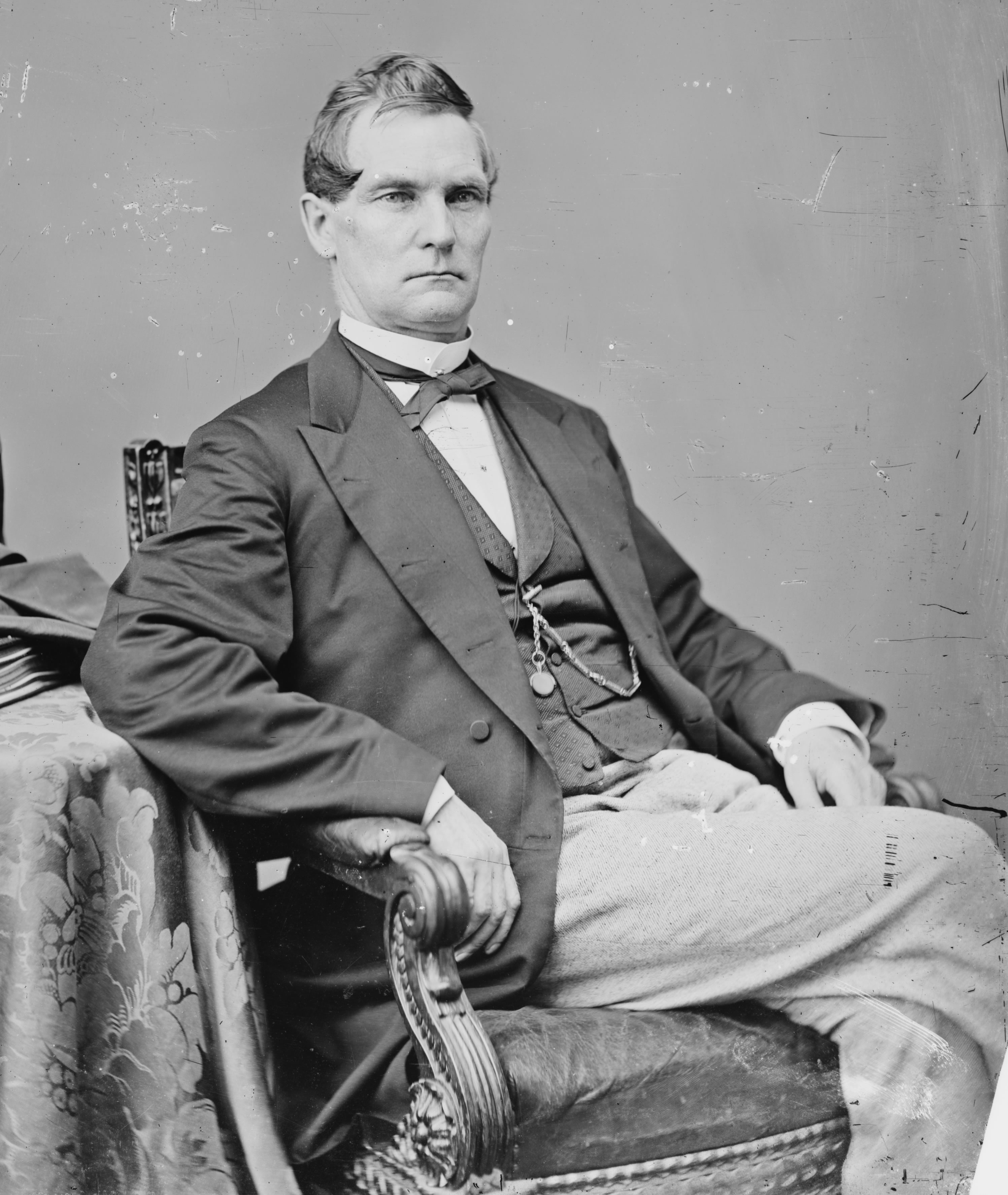
Wheeler between 1860 and 1875

During his House tenure, Wheeler served as chairman of the Committee on Pacific Railroads (42nd Congress) and the Committee on Commerce (43rd Congress).

Wheeler's reputation for honesty was celebrated by Allan Nevins in his introduction to John F. Kennedy's Profiles in Courage. Roscoe Conkling, a Senator and New York State political boss, once offered, "Wheeler, if you will act with us, there is nothing in the gift of the State of New York to which you may not reasonably aspire." Wheeler declined with "Mr. Conkling, there is nothing in the gift of the State of New York which will compensate me for the forfeiture of my self-respect."

Wheeler served as president of New York's Northern Railroad. He was also president of the New York State Constitutional Convention which met from June 1867 to February 1868. In his speech accepting the position, he made a strong case for racial equality:

"[W]e owe it to the cause of universal civil liberty, we owe it to the struggling liberalism of the old world,...that every man within [New York], of whatever race or color, or however poor, helpless, or lowly he may be, in virtue of his manhood, is entitled to the full employment of every right appertaining to the most exalted citizenship."

When Congress voted for a pay raise in 1873 and made it retroactive for five years (the Salary Grab Act), Wheeler not only voted against the raise but also returned his salary increase to the Treasury Department.

Wheeler was responsible for the so-called Wheeler Compromise of 1875, which settled a volatile political situation in Louisiana but eventually led to the withdrawal of federal troops and the end of Reconstruction.

== Election of 1876 ==
Wheeler was a delegate to the 1876 Republican National Convention, which had nominated Rutherford B. Hayes for president on the seventh ballot.

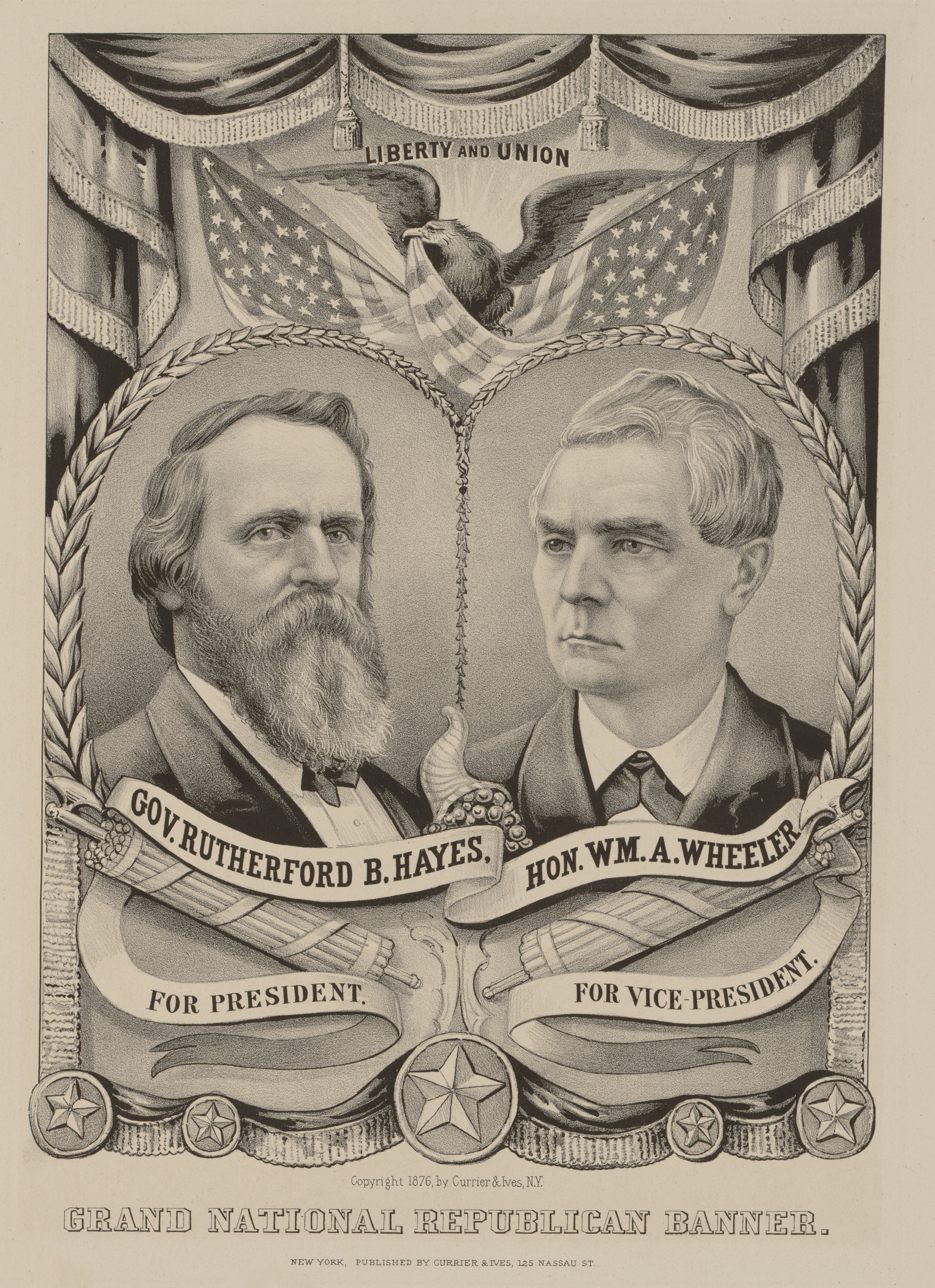
Hayes/Wheeler campaign poster

Wheeler was considered a "safe" choice for the vice presidential nomination, as he had not made many enemies over the course of his political career, though Roscoe Conkling himself supported the former congressman from New York, Stewart L. Woodford. When the time came for the convention to nominate a vice presidential candidate, congressman Luke P. Poland of Vermont nominated Wheeler, who immediately surged to the lead over Woodford and several other candidates. By the time the roll call reached New York, the result was apparent, and Woodford withdrew, enabling New York to cast all its votes for Wheeler. Wheeler won the nomination with 366 votes to the 89 for his nearest rival Frederick T. Frelinghuysen, who later served on the Electoral Commission which decided the 1876 election in favor of Hayes and Wheeler.

Governor Hayes, when he heard of Wheeler's nomination, wrote to his wife Lucy: "I am ashamed to say: Who is Wheeler?" Hayes and Wheeler had not served in the House of Representatives at the same time, so Hayes was unfamiliar with his running mate.

At the Republican National Convention, Frederick Douglass asked if the GOP would adhere to its pro-civil rights roots. The advocacy of Hayes and Wheeler, among a faction of Northern Republicans, was to abandon Reconstruction efforts and instead make conciliatory appeals to Southern Whiggery.

== Vice presidency (1877–1881) ==
Wheeler was inaugurated on March 4, 1877, and served until March 4, 1881. During Wheeler's term, the Hayes administration pursued an alliance between Northern Republicans and Old Southern Whigs, effectively abandoning post-Civil War Reconstruction. Hayes intended for the former Whigs who largely made up the South's business and merchant classes to replace the Democratic planter class as the dominant force in Southern government and politics. Events did not play out as Hayes envisioned, which meant that the end of Reconstruction enabled Democrats, largely former supporters of the Confederacy, to reassert control over black residents, including passage of Jim Crow laws that lasted well into the twentieth century.

Since Wheeler was a recent widower, his wife having died one year before he took office, he was a frequent guest at the White House's alcohol-free luncheons. As vice president, Wheeler presided over the Senate. According to Hayes, Wheeler "was one of the few Vice Presidents who were on cordial terms, intimate and friendly, with the President. Our family were heartily fond of him."

Hayes had announced at the start of his administration that he would not run for a second term. Wheeler did not run for the 1880 Republican presidential nomination, and retired at the end of his term.

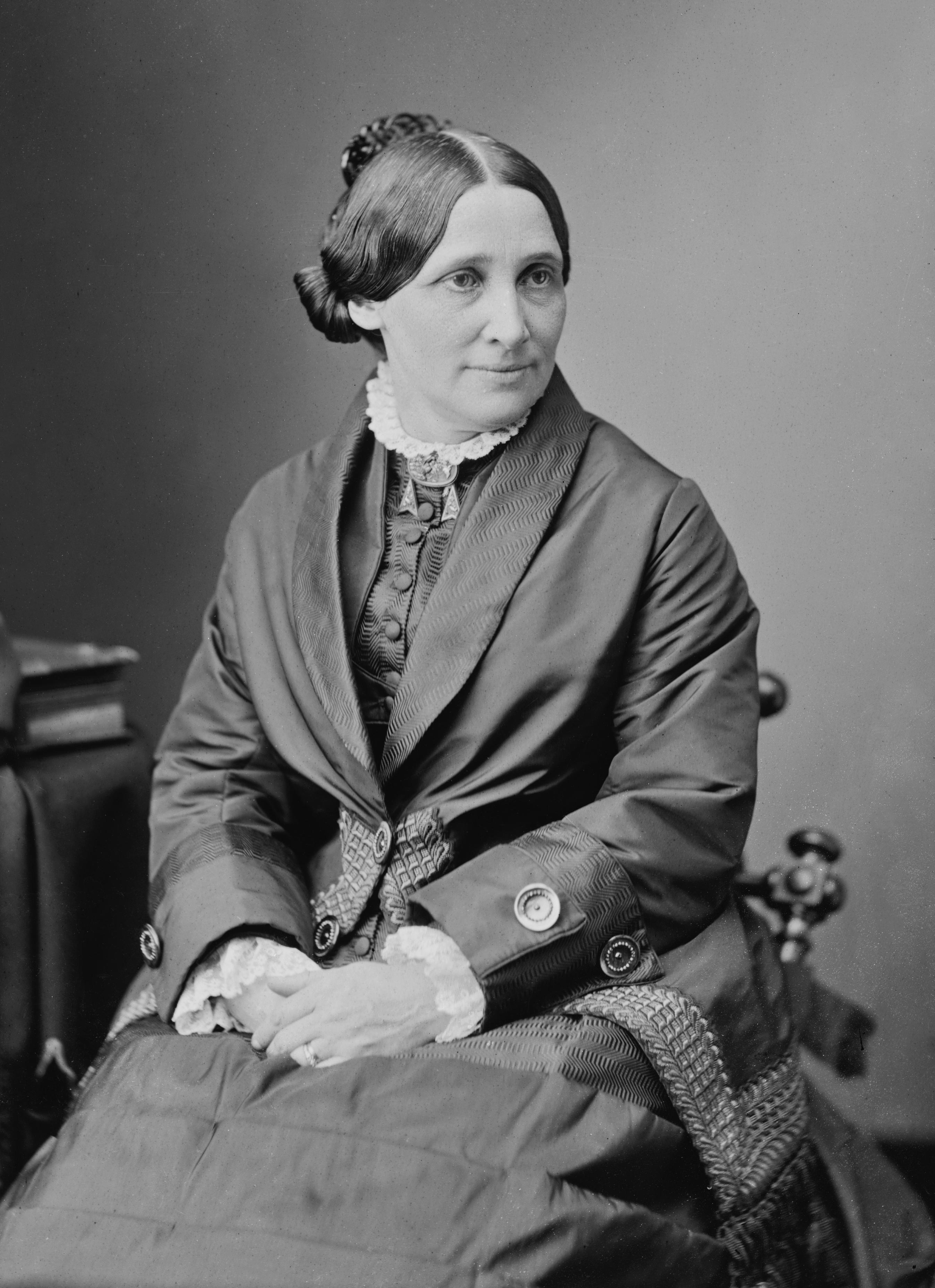
Lucy Webb Hayes

=== Lucy Hayes' fishing trip (1878) ===
When First Lady Lucy Webb Hayes found out about Wheeler's status as a widower without children, she and her husband felt it was their duty to take the lonely Wheeler into their social circle. Wheeler was grateful for their kindness, and during the spring of 1878, he asked Lucy to accompany him on a fishing trip in the Adirondacks. Lucy accepted and joined Wheeler on May 31. On their first day, they caught a large trout that weighed about 13 pounds. Wheeler sent it to the president; Hayes telegraphed jokingly that he thought it was more like 13 ounces. Hayes was actually surprised at the size of the fish, and had it served at an informal dinner with cabinet members and senators. The next day, Wheeler and Lucy were traveling back to Malone when a group of children began waving red flags. Touched by the act, Wheeler stopped their carriage so he could introduce the first lady to the children. The trip lasted eleven days, and when Lucy and her daughter Fanny returned to Washington, she wrote to Wheeler to thank him for "a wild and joyous time".

== Post-vice presidency (1881–1887) ==
In January 1881, Wheeler received 10 votes in the New York State Legislature's Republican caucus to determine a nominee for the U.S. Senate seat held by Democrat Francis Kernan. The Republican nomination went to Thomas C. Platt, who received 54 caucus votes. The Republicans controlled the legislature, and Platt defeated Kernan 104 votes to 50.

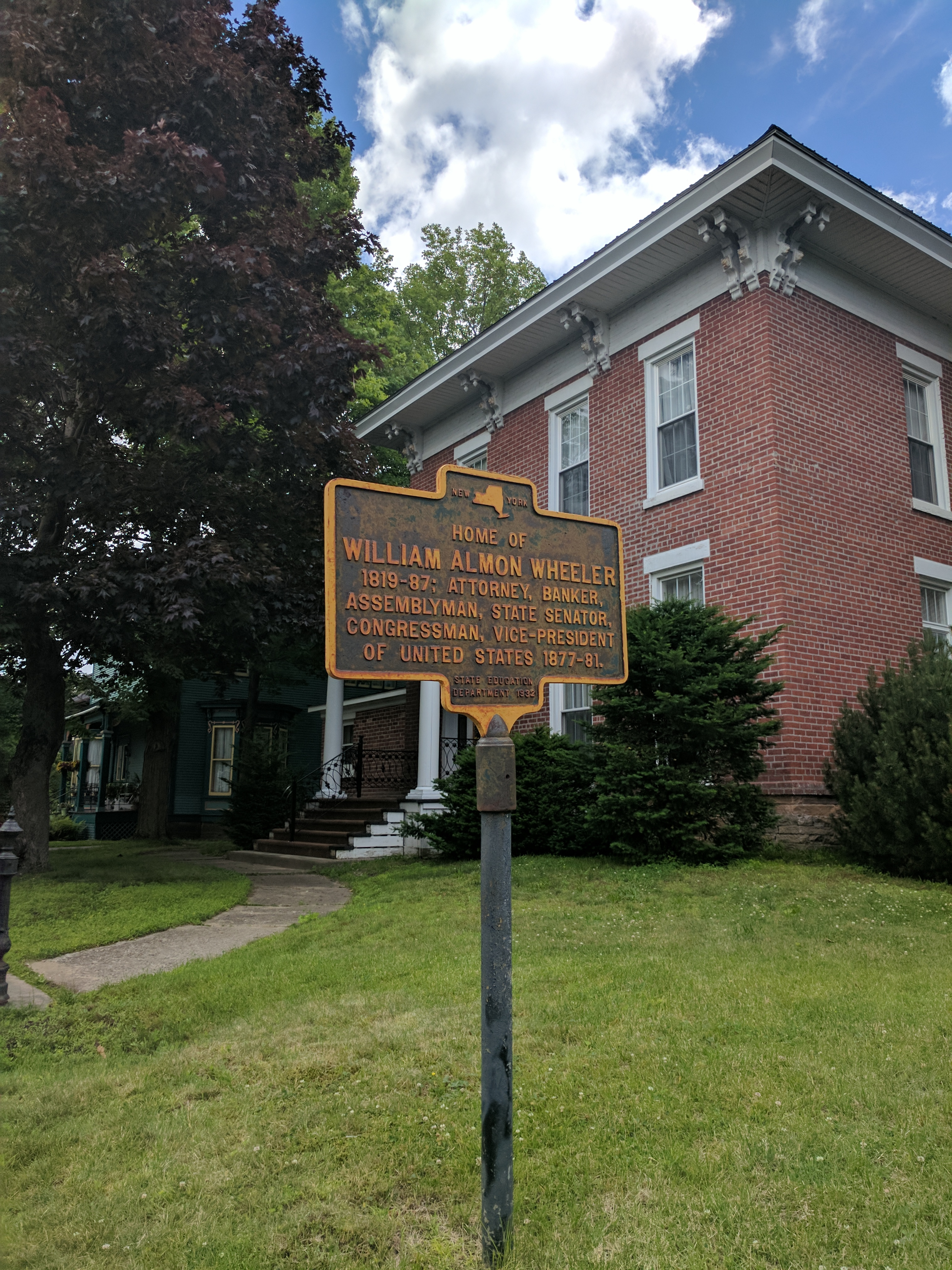
Wheeler's home in Malone, NY

Wheeler retired to Malone following the end of his vice presidential term on March 4, 1881. In May 1881, Platt and Roscoe Conkling resigned their U.S. Senate seats in a dispute with President James A. Garfield over control of patronage in New York, triggering two special elections. In the legislative election for Platt's seat, it took six weeks of balloting to elect a candidate. Wheeler's name was in consideration, and he received as many as 23 votes before Warner Miller was elected with 76 votes on the 46th ballot.

Wheeler was also a candidate for Conkling's seat. The voting went on for several weeks and Wheeler received as many as 50 votes on some ballots before Elbridge G. Lapham won with 92 votes on the 56th ballot.

=== Death ===
Wheeler suffered from several illnesses throughout his life and was in increasingly poor health during his later years. He died at his home at 10:10 a.m. on Saturday, June 4, 1887. The funeral was held at the Congregational church in Malone. He was interred next to his wife in Malone's Morningside Cemetery on June 7, 1887.

New York State Assembly
Preceded by George Gove	Member of the New York Assembly from Franklin County; 1850–1851	Succeeded by Darius Lawrence
New York State Senate
Preceded by Joseph H. Ramsey	Member of the New York Senate from the 17th district 1858–1859	Succeeded by Charles C. Montgomery
U.S. House of Representatives
Preceded by George Palmer	Member of the U.S. House of Representatives from New York's 16th congressional district 1861–1863	Succeeded by Orlando Kellogg
Preceded by Calvin T. Hulburd	Member of the U.S. House of Representatives from New York's 17th congressional district 1869–1873	Succeeded by Robert S. Hale
Preceded by John Carroll	Member of the U.S. House of Representatives from New York's 18th congressional district 1873–1875	Succeeded by Andrew Williams
Preceded by Henry H. Hathorn	Member of the U.S. House of Representatives from New York's 19th congressional district 1875–1877	Succeeded by Amaziah B. James
Party political offices
Preceded by Henry Wilson	Republican nominee for Vice President of the United States; 1876	Succeeded by Chester A. Arthur
Political offices
Preceded by Henry Wilson	Vice President of the United States; 1877–1881	Succeeded by Chester A. Arthur
