= Timeline of the Ulysses S. Grant presidency =

The presidency of Ulysses S. Grant began on March 4, 1869, when Ulysses S. Grant was inaugurated as the eighteenth president of the United States and ended on March 4, 1877, after two terms.

== 1869 ==
=== March 1869 ===
- March 4
  - Ulysses S. Grant is inaugurated as the eighteenth president of the United States. Schuyler Colfax becomes vice president of the United States.
  - The 41st United States Congress convenes for its first session.
- March 5 – Elihu B. Washburne, Ebenezer R. Hoar, John Creswell, Adolph E. Borie, and Jacob D. Cox become secretary of state, attorney general, postmaster general, secretary of the navy, and secretary of the interior, respectively.
- March 11 – George S. Boutwell and John Aaron Rawlins become secretary of the treasury and secretary of war. Hamilton Fish succeeds Elihu B. Washburne as secretary of state; Washburne served in the position for only six days.

=== April 1869 ===
- April 2 – Louisiana Lieutenant Governor Oscar Dunn becomes the first major black officeholder to visit the White House.
- April 7 – Grant asks Congress to expedite the readmission of Virginia as a state.
- April 10
  - The Judiciary Act of 1869 increases the number of Supreme Court justices from seven to nine, where it will remain to the present day.
  - The president is authorized by law to set votes for the citizens of Mississippi, Texas, and Virginia to vote on their respective constitutions for readmission as states.
  - The 41st United States Congress adjourns from its first session.
- April 16 – The United States signs a treaty of trademarks with the Second French Empire.

=== May 1869 ===
- May 10 – The first transcontinental railroad is completed. Stretching from Omaha, Nebraska, to Sacramento, California, it is completed when tracks of the Union Pacific Railroad and tracks of the Central Pacific Railroad are joined at Promontory Point, Utah.
- May 14 – Grant issues a proclamation declaring that the people of Virginia will vote on their new constitution on July 6.
- May 19 – Grant issues a proclamation defining the eight-hour workday for federal employees.
- May 26 – The United States signs a Bancroft Treaty of naturalization and a treaty of disposal of property with Sweden and Norway.
- May 29 – Grant attends a memorial service at Arlington National Cemetery.

=== June 1869 ===
- June 25 – George M. Robeson succeeds Adolph E. Borie as secretary of the navy.

=== July 1869 ===
- July 13
  - Grant informs the Dominican Republic that he will send Orville E. Babcock to collect information in Santo Domingo.
  - Grant issues a proclamation declaring that the people of Mississippi will vote on their new constitution on November 30.
- July 15 – Grant issues a proclamation declaring that the people of Texas will vote on their new constitution on November 30.

=== September 1869 ===
- September 9 – William Tecumseh Sherman succeeds John Aaron Rawlins as secretary of war.
- September 24 – The Black Friday gold panic occurs when Grant sells $4 million worth of federal gold, causing severe devaluation. The sale was carried out to thwart Erie Railroad investors Jay Gould and James Fisk in their effort to manipulate Grant's gold policy and corner the market.

=== October 1869 ===
- October 25 – William W. Belknap succeeds William Tecumseh Sherman as secretary of war.

=== November 1869 ===
- November 29 – The United States signs treaties to annex Santo Domingo and lease Samaná Bay. They will ultimately not be ratified.

=== December 1869 ===
- December 6
  - The 41st United States Congress convenes for its second session.
  - Grant delivers the 1869 State of the Union Address.
- December 14 – Grant nominates Ebenezer R. Hoar to the Supreme Court.
- December 20 – Grant nominates Edwin Stanton to the Supreme Court. He is confirmed the same day but will die before he begins service.
- December 22 – George Foster Shepley, Lewis Bartholomew Woodruff, William McKennan, William Burnham Woods, Thomas Drummond, and John Forrest Dillon are confirmed for the U.S. Circuit Courts for the First, Second, Third, Fifth, Seventh, and Eighth Circuits, respectively. Solomon Lewis Withey is confirmed to the U.S. Circuit Court for the Sixth Circuit, but he declines. Grant had also nominated George A. Pearre and George H. Yeaman to the U.S. Circuit Courts for the Fourth and Sixth Circuits, respectively, but they were unsuccessful.

== 1870 ==
=== January 1870 ===
- January 2 – Construction begins on the Brooklyn Bridge in New York City.
- January 10 – Lorenzo Sawyer is confirmed to the U.S. Circuit Court for the Ninth Circuit.
- January 11 – Grant vetoes the Rollin White Private Relief Bill. The bill would have compensated Rollin White for patent infringement on his revolver design, but Grant determines that the patent would have restricted the Union war effort. This is the first of many relief bills Grant will veto.
- January 17 – Halmor Hull Emmons is confirmed to the U.S. Circuit Court for the Sixth Circuit.
- January 26 – Virginia is readmitted as a state.

=== February 1870 ===
- February 3 – The Senate rejects Gran't nomination of Ebenezer R. Hoar to the Supreme Court.
- February 7 – Grant nominates Joseph P. Bradley and William Strong to the Supreme Court.
- February 9 – The United States Weather Bureau (the present-day National Weather Service) is established as part of the United States Army Signal Corps.
- February 18 – William Strong is confirmed as a justice of the Supreme Court.
- February 23 – Mississippi is readmitted as a state.
- February 24 – The United States signs a boundary agreement with the United Kingdom.

=== March 1870 ===
- March 21 – Joseph P. Bradley is confirmed as a justice of the Supreme Court.
- March 30
  - The Fifteenth Amendment to the United States Constitution is ratified. It guarantees the right to vote without discrimination on the basis of race. Efforts will be made in Southern states to pass laws that indirectly prevent Black Americans from voting.
  - Texas is readmitted as a state.
  - The New York Herald publishes an interview with Grant where he argues in favor of annexing Dominican Republic.

=== May 1870 ===
- May 13 – The United States signs a Bancroft Treaty of naturalization with the United Kingdom.
- May 23 – The United States signs a treaty of extradition with El Salvador.
- May 24 – Grant issues a proclamation condemning the Fenian raids, attacks on British Canada by the Fenian Brotherhood—an Irish–American Irish nationalist group.
- May 25 – The Fenian Brotherhood launches another raid against British Canada.
- May 31 – In an attempt to combat the Ku Klux Klan and its aggression toward black voters, the Enforcement Act of 1870 makes it a federal crime to interfere with a person's right to vote.

=== June 1870 ===
- June 3 – The United States signs a treaty of supression of African slave trade with the United Kingdom.
- June 22 – The United States Department of Justice is established as a federal department for the attorney general.
- June 23 – Amos T. Akerman succeeds Ebenezer R. Hoar as attorney general.
- June 25 – The United States signs a treaty of extradition with Nicaragua.
- June 28 – New Year's Day, Independence Day, and Christmas are made holidays in Washington, D.C.
- June 29 – Grant nominates John Morrison Oliver to the Supreme Court of the District of Columbia, but the nomination will be unsuccessful.
- June 30 – The Senate rejects a treaty to annex Santo Domingo by a vote of 28 in favor and 28 opposed.

=== July 1870 ===
- July 11 – The United States signs a treaty of rights, privileges, and immunities of consular officers with Austria-Hungary.
- July 13 – Hugh Lennox Bond is confirmed to the U.S. Circuit Court for the Fourth Circuit.
- July 14
  - The Tariff Act of 1870 is passed. It generally leaves established tariffs intact, and it adds a tariff on most fruit imports.
  - Grant sends a message to Congress encouraging stronger relations with Latin America.
- July 15 – The 41st United States Congress adjourns from its second session.
- July 22 – Soldiers are sent to North Carolina to combat the Ku Klux Klan.

=== August 1870 ===
- August 22 – Grant issues a proclamation declaring neutrality in the Franco-Prussian War.

=== September 1870 ===
- September 6 – The United States signs a treaty of friendship, commerce, and navigation with Peru.
- September 12 – The United States signs a treaty of extradition with Peru.
- September 20 – The United States signs a treaty of naturalization with Austria-Hungary.

=== November 1870 ===
- November 1 – Columbus Delano succeeds Jacob D. Cox as secretary of the interior.
- November 8 – The 1870 United States elections take place. Republicans lose seats in both chambers of Congress but retain their supermajorities majorities.

=== December 1870 ===
- December 3 – Grant nominates Ward Hunt to the Supreme Court.
- December 5
  - The 41st United States Congress convenes for its third session.
  - Grant delivers the 1870 State of the Union Address. He asks Congress to authorize military rule in the South to the Ku Klux Klan.
- December 6 – The United States signs a treaty of amity, commerce, and consular privileges with El Salvador.
- December 11 – Ward Hunt is confirmed as a justice of the Supreme Court.
- December 12 – Charles D. Drake is confirmed as Chief Justice of the United States Court of Claims.

== 1871 ==
=== January 1871 ===
- January 13 – Grant informs Congress and the Department of War of racial violence in North Carolina.
- January 17 – Grant informs Congress that "disloyal organizations" such as the Ku Klux Klan are resisting the law in the South.

=== February 1871 ===
- February 23 – The United States signs a treaty of naturalization with the United Kingdom.
- February 26 – The United States signs a treaty of commerce and navigation with the Kingdom of Italy.
- February 28
  - To protect the right of Black Americans to vote, the Second Enforcement Act mandates federal supervision of elections in any city with a population over 20,000 people.
  - The Steamboat Inspection Service is established in the Department of the Treasury.

=== March 1871 ===
- March 3
  - The Indian Appropriation Act of 1871 ends recognition of sovereign Native American tribes and abolishes the system of treaties between the United States and tribal authorities.
  - The Appropriations Act grants the president the power to regulate the civil service. He creates the United States Civil Service Commission.
  - The Centennial Exposition is authorized, set to take place in Philadelphia in 1876 to celebrate the 100th anniversary of American independence.
  - The 41st United States Congress adjourns from its third session.
- March 4
  - The 42nd United States Congress convenes for its first session.
  - The United States Civil Service Commission is established, but without any funds.

=== April 1871 ===
- April 5 – Grant delivers a message to Congress disputing corruption allegations in regard to his efforts to annex the Dominican Republic.
- April 20
  - The Third Enforcement Act, or the Ku Klux Klan Act, establishes measures against the Ku Klux Klan's aggression toward black voters by prohibiting the intimidation of election officials, the formation of conspiracies, and the wearing of disguises. It includes the power to suspend habeas corpus and to use military force.
  - The 42nd United States Congress adjourns from its first session.

=== May 1871 ===
- May 1 – The Supreme Court issues its decision in Legal Tender Cases. It rules that paper money as legal tender, as established by the Legal Tender Acts of 1862 and 1863, is constitutional.
- May 3 – Grant issues a proclamation condemning violations of the Third Enforcement Act.
- May 8 – The United States signs the Treaty of Washington with the United Kingdom.

=== June 1871 ===
- June 12 – The United States signs a treaty of naturalization with the North German Confederation.

=== July 1871 ===
- July – The Hayden Geological Survey of 1871 begins.

=== September 1871 ===
- September 4 – The Committee of Seventy, a citizen's commission in New York, opens a corruption investigation into Tammany Hall, an influential political organization led by William M. Tweed.

=== October 1871 ===
- October 8 – The Great Chicago Fire occurs in Chicago.
- October 12 – Grant issues a proclamation condemning Ku Klux Klan activity in South Carolina.
- October 17 – Grant suspends the write of habeas corpus in nine South Carolinian counties.

=== November 1871 ===
- November 25 – The United States signs a treaty of trademarks with Austria.

=== December 1871 ===
- December 4
  - The 42nd United States Congress convenes for its second session.
  - Grant delivers the 1871 State of the Union Address. He questions whether the Fourteenth Amendment's prohibition on ex-Confederates holding office is helpful, arguing that Southern states will elect different politicians with the same beliefs.
- December 11 – The United States signs a treaty of duties, rights, privileges, immunities of consular officers, and trademarks with the German Empire.
- December 13 – Grant removes Attorney General Amos Akerman.
- December 19 – Grant asks Congress for expansion of the Civil Service Commission.

== 1872 ==
=== January 1872 ===
- January 10 – George Henry Williams succeeds Amos T. Akerman as attorney general.

=== March 1872 ===
- March 1 – Yellowstone National Park is established.
- March 10 – Grant forms a commission to plan a canal to connect the Pacific and Atlantic oceans. This will lead to the unsuccessful attempt to build a canal in Nicaragua.
- March 13 – Grant issues a proclamation creating a commission to study a trans-continental canal between the Pacific and Atlantic Oceans.

=== April 1872 ===
- April 5 – A relief bill is passed to support victims of the Great Chicago Fire. It creates exemptions to import duties for goods to be delivered as aid.
- April 15 – Grant issues the nation's first veto of a Private Pension Bill, which he will do four more times before the end of his presidency.
- April 19 – Grant delivers a message to the House about Ku Klux Klan activity in South Carolina.

=== May 1872 ===
- May 3 – The 1872 Liberal Republican convention selects newspaper editor Horace Greeley as the Liberal Republican Party's nominee for president, with Missouri Governor B. Gratz Brown as his running mate.
- May 6 – The United States signs a treaty of naturalization with Ecuador.
- May 10 – Mineral deposits on any public lands are made available for American citizens to explore.
- May 22 – The Amnesty Act grants most ex-Confederates an exemption to the Fourteenth Amendment's ban on insurrectionists holding office.

=== June 1872 ===
- June 1 – Grant issues a proclamation to end his administration's prosecution of ex-Confederates.
- June 6
  - The 1872 Republican National Convention selects Grant as the Republican Party's nominee for president, with Henry Wilson as his running mate.
  - The Tariff Act of 1872 modifies the Tariff Act of 1870. It is supposed to exempt imported fruit-plants from duties, but a mistake in the document creates an exemption for imported fruit. This mistake costs the government approximately $2 million in duties.
- June 8 – The 42nd United States Congress adjourns from its second session.
- June 10 – Grant accepts the Republican Party's presidential nomination.
- June 28 – The United States signs a treaty of extradition with Ecuador.

=== July 1872 ===
- July 10 – The 1872 Democratic National Convention chooses to endorse the Liberal Republican Party's presidential ticket of Horace Greeley and B. Gratz Brown .
- July 20 – The United States signs a Bancroft Treaty of naturalization with Denmark.

=== September 1872 ===
- September 14 – An arbitration panel for the Treaty of Washington reaches a decision. It determines that the United Kingdom should pay the United States $15.5 million worth of gold.

=== November 1872 ===
- November 5 – The 1872 United States elections take place. Grant wins reelection in the presidential election with 214 electoral votes against Horace Greely's 80. The Republican Party retains control of both chambers of Congress.

=== December 1872 ===
- December 2
  - The 42nd United States Congress convenes for its third session.
  - Grant delivers the 1872 State of the Union Address.
- December 22 – The United States signs a treaty of friendship, commerce, and extradition with the Orange Free State.

== 1873 ==
=== January 1873 ===
- January 6 – The House opens a corruption investigation into the Crédit Mobilier scandal, involving the Union Pacific Railroad, the Crédit Mobilier bank, and Congressmen who accepted bribes.
- January 13 – Grant nominates Richard Busteed to the Supreme Court of the District of Columbia, but the nomination will be unsuccessful.
- January 18 – The United States and the United Kingdom sign an amendment to the Treaty of Washington.

=== February 1873 ===
- February 12 – The Coinage Act of 1873 ends the use of silver in coins due to limited supply. Opponents call the act the Crime of '73. It is especially unpopular in Nevada as the state's silver supply increases.
- February 27 – The House censures Congressmen Oakes Ames and James Brooks for their involvement in the Crédit Mobilier scandal.

=== March 1873 ===
- March 3
  - The Comstock Act of 1873 bans "obscene literature and articles of immoral use". It also bans sending contraceptives and abortion medication by federal mail.
  - Congress passes an unpopular pay increase for its own salaries, including backpay.
  - The 42nd United States Congress adjourns from its third session.
- March 4 – Grant is inaugurated for his second term. Henry Wilson becomes vice president.
- March 10 – The United States signs a border agreement with the United Kingdom.
- March 17 – William Adams Richardson succeeds George S. Boutwell as secretary of the treasury.

=== April 1873 ===
- April 14 – The Supreme Court issues its decision in the Slaughter-House Cases. It rules that the Privileges or Immunities Clause of the Fourteenth Amendment does not apply to state law.

=== May 1873 ===
- May 12 – The United States signs a treaty of extradition and a treaty of amity, commerce, and consular privileges with El Salvador.
- May 23 – Grant issues a proclamation calling for law and order in Louisiana.

=== June 1873 ===
- June 5 – The United States signs a treaty of friendship, commerce, navigation, and extradition with Peru.
- June 7 – The United States signs a fishing agreement with the United Kingdom to amend the Treaty of Washington.

=== July 1873 ===
- July 3 – Grant issues a proclamation announcing the Centennial Exposition in 1876.

=== August 1873 ===
- August 5 – Grant issues an executive order to expand civil service regulations.

=== September 1873 ===
- September 18 – The Panic of 1873 occurs. It comes after a crash in the European stock market, inflation and speculation in the United States, and the failure of the Jay Cooke & Company brokerage. The economic downturn will last for six years.
- September 20 – The New York Stock Exchange temporarily closes in response to the Panic of 1873.
- September 30 – The New York Stock Exchange reopens.

=== October 1873 ===
- October 31 – The Virginius Affair begins when the Spanish Navy captures the Virginius, which Spain says is an American ship preparing an invasion of Spanish Cuba. Fifty-three of the ship's crew will be executed before Spanish Cuba receives word that the Spanish government does not want the crew executed.

=== November 1873 ===
- November 19 – William M. Tweed is convicted on 204 counts of fraud and sentenced to twelve years in prison after defrauding New York City of $200 million.

=== December 1873 ===
- December 1
  - The 43rd United States Congress convenes for its first session.
  - Grant delivers the 1873 State of the Union Address.
  - Grant nominates George Henry Williams as Chief Justice of the United States.

== 1874 ==
=== January 1874 ===
- January 5 – Grant informs Congress that the United States has resolved its dispute with Spain regarding the capture of the American ship Virginius in October 1873.
- January 8 – Grant withdraws his nomination of George Henry Williams as Chief Justice of the United States.
- January 9 – Grant nominates Caleb Cushing as Chief Justice of the United States.
- January 13 – Grant withdraws his nomination of Caleb Cushing as Chief Justice of the United States.
- January 19 – Grant nominates Morrison Waite as Chief Justice of the United States.
- January 20 – The Congressional pay raise from March 1873 is repealed after strong backlash.
- January 21 – Morrison Waite is confirmed as Chief Justice of the United States.

=== March 1874 ===
- March 19 – The United States signs a treaty of extradition wit Belgium.
- March 28 – The United States signs a treaty of trademarks with the Russian Empire.

=== April 1874 ===
- April 22 – Grant vetoes a bill that would have introduced $100 million into the economy. He objects to using inflation as a measure to alleviate the economic downturn.

=== May 1874 ===
- May 28 – The United States signs a fishing agreement for Newfoundland with the United Kingdom.

=== June 1874 ===
- June 2
  - Benjamin Bristow succeeds William Adams Richardson as secretary of the treasury.
  - William Adams Richardson is confirmed to the U.S. Court of Claims.
- June 23 – The 43rd United States Congress adjourns from its first session.

=== July 1874 ===
- July 3 – James William Marshall succeeds John Creswell as postmaster general.

=== August 1874 ===
- August 11 – The United States signs a treaty of extradition and a real estate rights treaty with the Ottoman Empire.
- August 24 – Marshall Jewell succeeds James William Marshall as postmaster general.

=== September 1874 ===
- September 15 – Grant issues a proclamation calling for the White League paramilitary in Louisiana to disperse. He orders five thousand soldiers and three gunboats to position themselves in New Orleans.
- September 17 – The White League disperses.

=== October 1874 ===
- October 9 – The United States signs the Treaty of Bern with several other nations to form a General Postal Union.

=== November 1874 ===
- November 3 – The 1874 United States elections take place. The Democratic Party takes control of the House and strengthens its minority in the Senate.
- November 3 –
- November 18 – The anti-alcohol Woman's Christian Temperance Union forms in Cleveland.

=== December 1874 ===
- December 7
  - The 43rd United States Congress convenes for its second session.
  - Grant delivers the 1874 State of the Union Address.
- December 21 – Grant issues a proclamation calling for the dispersal of insurgents in Mississippi.

== 1875 ==
=== January 1875 ===
- January 10 – The Reciprocity Treaty of 1875 establishes broad trade rights with Hawaii, effectively making Hawaii a protectorate of the United States.
- January 13 – Grant delivers a message to Congress reporting on the 1872 Louisiana gubernatorial election and the military's involvement in combating the White League in Louisiana.
- January 14 – The Specie Payment Resumption Act restores the ability to trade banknotes for coins, effective January 1879.
- January 30 – The United States signs a treaty of commercial reciprocity with the Hawaiian Kingdom.

=== March 1875 ===
- March 1 – The Civil Rights Act of 1875 guarantees equal rights to public places and jury duty for people of any race. The bill does not include enforcement, and it will be declared unconstitutional by the Supreme Court in 1883.
- March 3 – The 43rd United States Congress adjourns from its second session.
- March 8 – The United States signs a treaty of commerce and navigation with Belgium.

=== May 1875 ===
- May 10 – The Whiskey Ring, a group of whiskey distillers bribing federal officials to dodge millions of dollars in taxes, is broken up when 238 people are indicted.
- May 15 – Edwards Pierrepont succeeds George H. Williams as attorney general.
- May 20 – The United States signs the Metre Convention with several European and South American nations to establish a system of weights and measures.
- May 29 – Grant declares that he will not run for a third term in a letter to Representative Henry White, which is published by the press.

=== July 1875 ===
- July 1 – The General Postal Union is established as an international organization with the United States as a member.
- July 29 – Grant is informed that his assistant General Orville E. Babcock may be involved with the Whiskey Ring bribery plot. Grant informs Secretary of the Treasury Benjamin Bristow that he wishes to see all guilty parties be prosecuted.

=== August 1875 ===
- August 10 – Grant's statement that he is willing to see his allies prosecuted for the Whiskey Ring scandal is reported in the press.

=== September 1875 ===
- September 7 – Mississippi Governor Adelbert Ames informs Grant that the state is facing civil unrest leading up to an election. Grant declines Ames's request for federal intervention.
- September 29 – Grant delivers a speech at an event celebrating the Army of the Tennessee in Des Moines, Iowa.

=== October 1875 ===
- October 25 – Grant appoints Alexander S. Johnson to the U.S. Circuit Court for the Second Circuit as a recess appointment.

=== November 1875 ===
- November 22 – Vice President Henry Wilson dies.

=== December 1875 ===
- December 6 – The 44th United States Congress convenes for its first session.
- December 7 – Grant delivers the 1875 State of the Union Address. He calls for non-sectarian compulsory education.
- December 9 – Grant's assistant Orville E. Babcock is indicted for his involvement with the Whiskey Ring plot.
- December 15
  - The House adopts the Springer Resolution which condemns the idea of a third presidential term.
  - Grant's recess appointment Alexander S. Johnson is confirmed to the U.S. Circuit Court for the Second Circuit.

== 1876 ==
=== February 1876 ===
- February 8 – Orville E. Babcock goes to trial for his involvement in the Whiskey Ring plot.
- February 12 – Grant gives deposition at the trial of his assistant Orville E. Babcock.
- February 24 – Orville E. Babcock is acquitted of fraud for his involvement in the Whiskey Ring plot.

=== March 1876 ===
- March 2 – The House passes articles of impeachment against Secretary of War William W. Belknap for accepting bribes from traders at Indian trading posts in what becomes known as the trader post scandal. Belknap resigns.
- March 8 – Alphonso Taft becomes secretary of war, filling the vacancy left by William W. Belknap.
- March 27 – The Supreme Court issues its decision in United States v. Cruikshank. It rules that the Equal Protection Clause and the Due Process Clause of the Fourteenth Amendment only imposes obligations on state governments, not individual citizens.

=== April 1876 ===
- April 3 – Congress passes a resolution asking the president to inform Congress every time he leaves the capital.
- April 18 – Grant vetoes the Act Fixing the Salary of the President.

=== May 1876 ===
- May 4 – Grant rejects Congress's resolution that the president should inform Congress when he leaves the capital.
- May 10 – The Centennial Exposition begins in Fairmount Park, Philadelphia. Grant gives a speech at its opening.
- May 22 – Secretary of War Alphonso Taft succeeds Edwards Pierrepont as attorney general. J. Donald Cameron succeeds Taft as secretary of war.

=== June 1876 ===
- June 14 – The 1876 Republican National Convention selects Ohio Governor Rutherford B. Hayes as the Republican Party's presidential nominee, with Congressman William A. Wheeler as his running mate.
- June 21 – Lot M. Morrill succeeds Benjamin Bristow as secretary of the treasury.
- June 25 – The Battle of the Little Bighorn takes place at the Little Bighorn River during the Great Sioux War of 1876, which had started when white settlers occupied the Black Hills to mine for gold. Lieutenant Colonel George Armstrong Custer leads 266 soldiers against Sitting Bull and his Sioux and Cheyenne warriors. Custer and all of his men are killed, and Custer becomes a martyr as relations crumble between the United States and Indian tribes.
- June 29 – The 1876 Democratic National Convention selects New York Governor Samuel J. Tilden as the Democratic Party's presidential nominee, with Indiana Governor Thomas A. Hendricks as his running mate.

=== July 1876 ===
- July 4 – Celebrations are held for the one-hundredth anniversary of the Declaration of Independence. Grant attends an event for War of 1812 veterans at Ford's Grand Opera House.
- July 12 – James Noble Tyner succeeds Marshall Jewell as postmaster general.
- July 22 – The trade dollar loses its status as legal tender. Congress authorizes $10 million worth of silver coins to be minted.

=== August 1876 ===
- August 1
  - Colorado is admitted as the thirty-eighth state.
  - Secretary of War William W. Belknap is acquitted in his impeachment trial on the basis that he had already resigned, meaning the constitutional authority to impeach him is in doubt.
- August 15 – The 44th United States Congress adjourns from its first session.

=== October 1876 ===
- October 1 – Columbus Delano ends his tenure as secretary of the interior.
- October 19 – Zachariah Chandler becomes secretary of the interior, filling the vacancy left by Columbus Delano.

=== November 1876 ===
- November 7 – The 1876 United States elections take place. Samuel J. Tilden wins in the initial count of electoral votes in the presidential election with 184 to Rutherford B. Hayes's 165, but the results are disputed in 1876 United States presidential election in Florida, Louisiana, Oregon, and South Carolina.
- November 23 – Grant issues an executive order prohibiting the sale of ammunition and cartridges to Native Americans.

=== December 1876 ===
- December 4 – The 44th United States Congress convenes for its second session.
- December 5 – Grant delivers the 1876 State of the Union Address.

== 1877 ==
=== January 1877 ===
- January 5 – The United States signs a treaty of extradition with Spain.
- January 12 – The United States signs a treaty of juridical procedure with Spain.
- January 29 – Congress forms a 15-person commission of Congressmen and Supreme Court justices to resolve the disputed presidential election results.

=== March 1877 ===
- March 2 – In the Compromise of 1877, the commission determines that Rutherford B. Hayes won the presidential election. All eight Republican members of the commission voted to recognize Republican candidate Hayes as the winner, and all seven Democratic members of the commission voted to recognize Democratic candidate Tilden as the winner. As part of the compromise, Reconstruction and federal intervention in the Southern states ends.
- March 3
  - Rutherford B. Hayes takes the oath of office privately a day prior to the start of his term because March 4 is a Sunday.
  - The 44th United States Congress adjourns from its second session.
- March 4 – Grant's term ends and Rutherford B. Hayes becomes the nineteenth president of the United States. Hayes's inauguration is postponed for a day because March 4 is a Sunday.

== Works cited ==
- Bevans, Charles I. (1968). Treaties and Other International Agreements of the United States of America, 1776-1949. United States Department of State.
