= Bibliography of Rutherford B. Hayes =

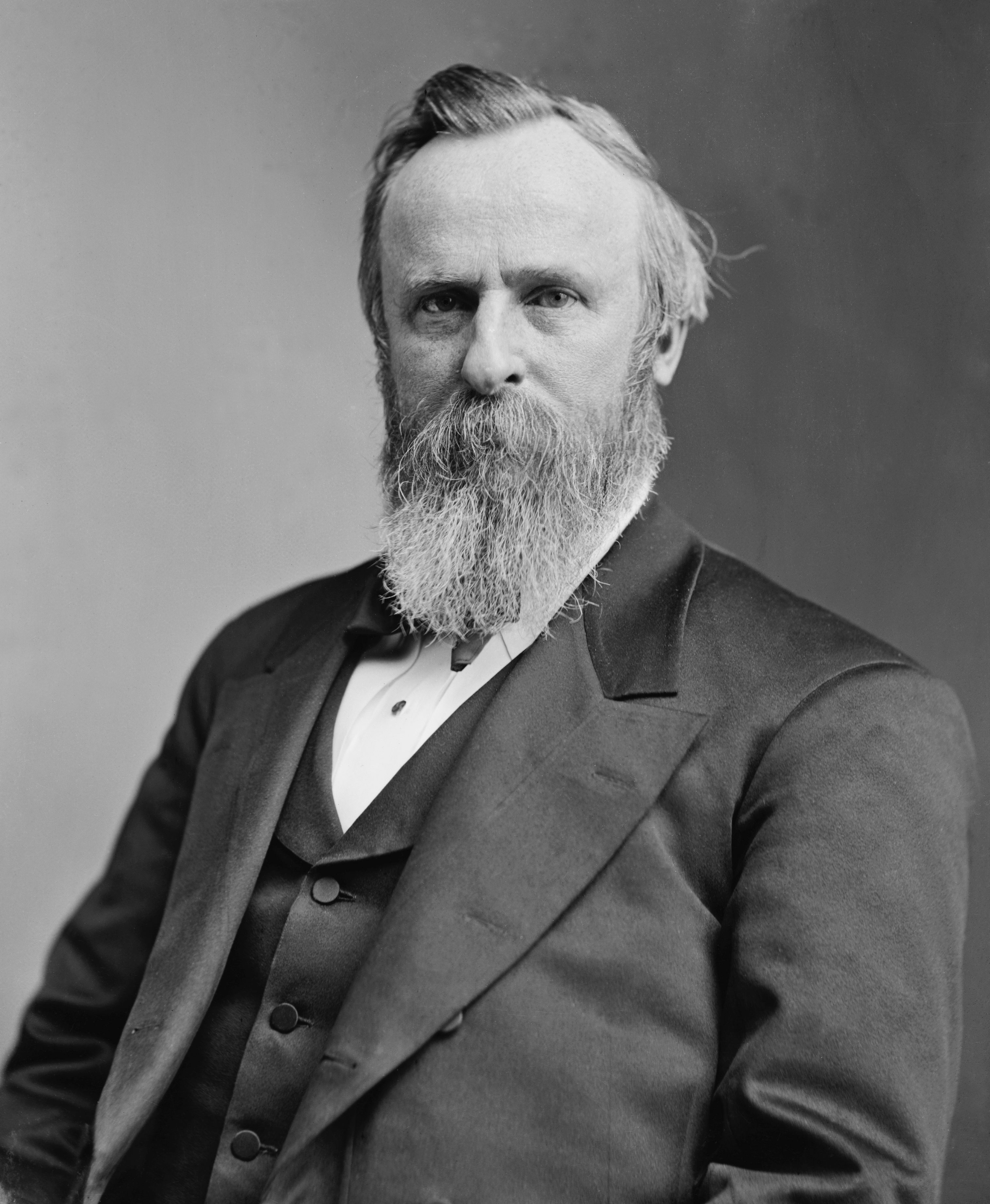
- Rutherford B. Hayes (1822–1893)
- Subject: Rutherford B. Hayes
- Scope: Books, journal articles, book chapters
- Period covered: October 4, 1822 – January 17, 1893
- Languages: English
- Part of bibliography series about: President of the United States
- Related bibliographies: Bibliography of Andrew Johnson; Bibliography of the Reconstruction era; Bibliography of works on Ulysses S. Grant
- Related timelines: Timeline of the Rutherford B. Hayes presidency; Timeline of the Ulysses S. Grant presidency
- Related outlines and indexes: List of bibliographies of presidents of the United States; List of presidents of the United States; Outline of the history of the United States

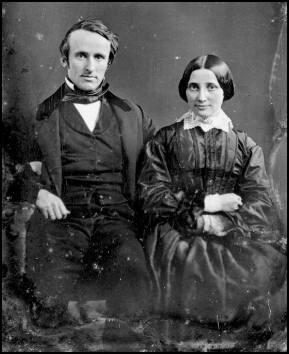
Rutherford and Lucy Hayes on their wedding day: December 30, 1852

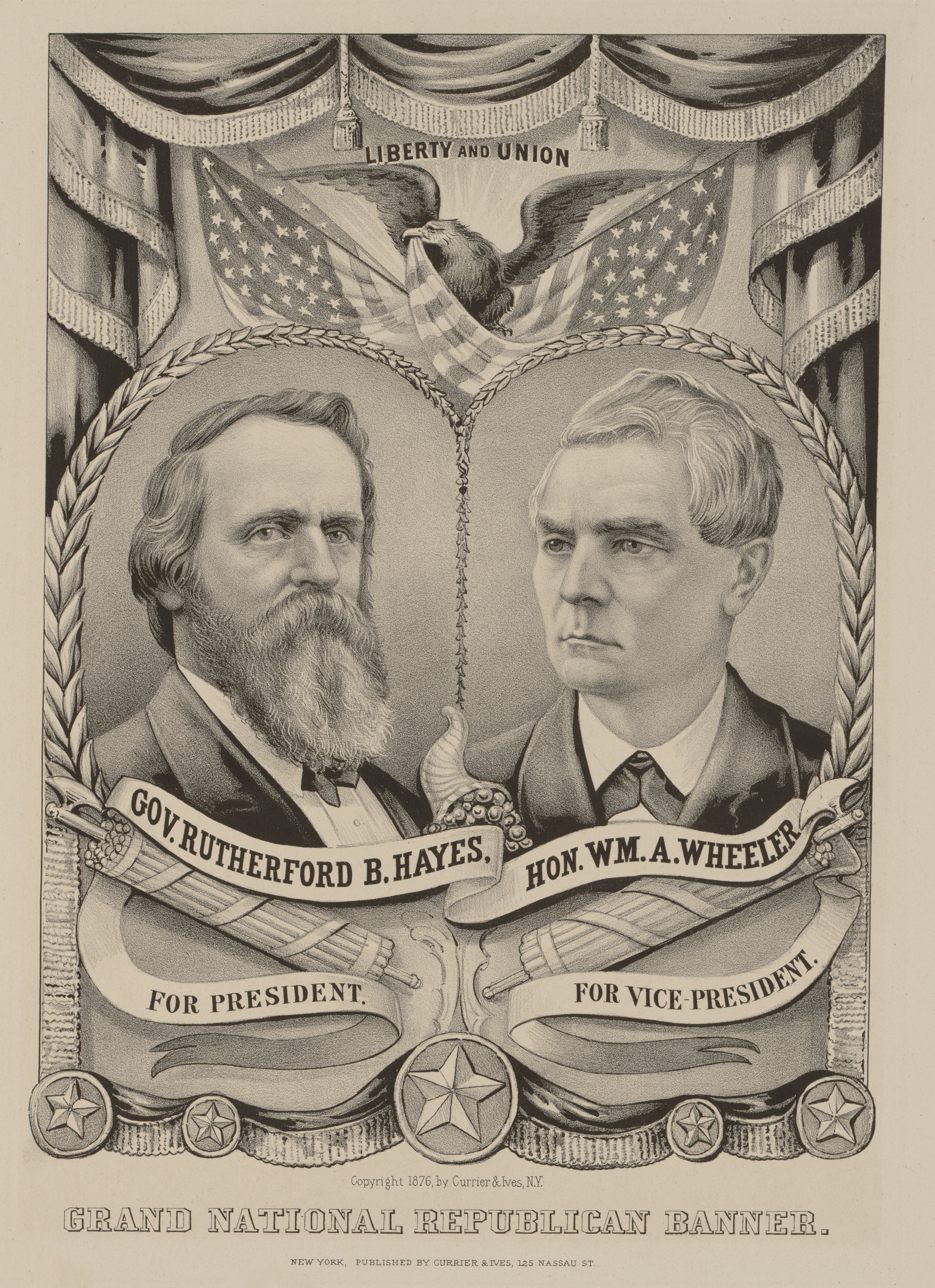
Rutherford and Lucy Hayes on their wedding day: December 30, 1852

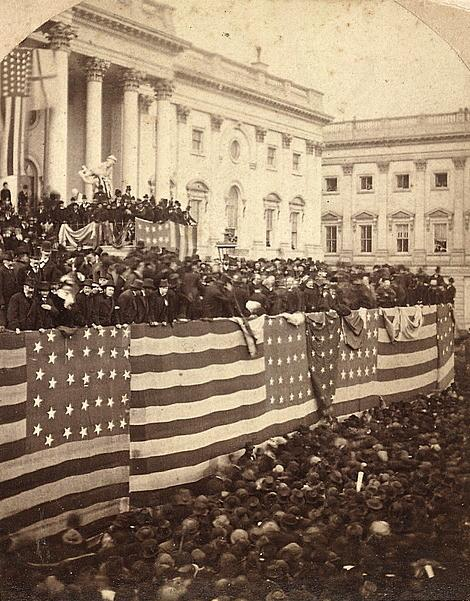
Rutherford and Lucy Hayes on their wedding day: December 30, 1852

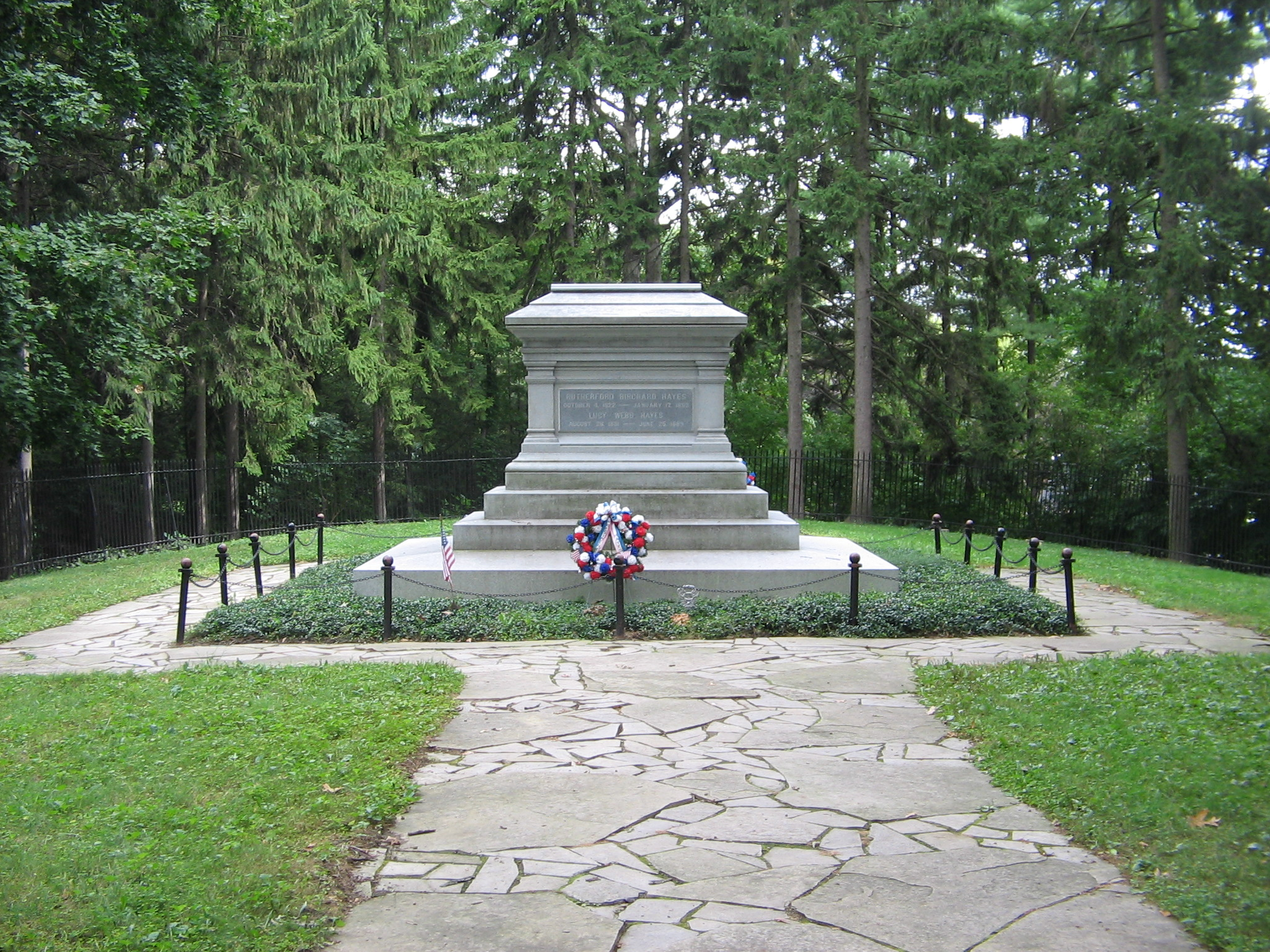
Rutherford and Lucy Hayes on their wedding day: December 30, 1852

This is a select bibliography of academic level books and journal articles about the life of Rutherford B. Hayes and the historical context of his life and presidency.

Rutherford Birchard Hayes (/ˈrʌðərfərd/; October 4, 1822 – January 17, 1893) was the 19th president of the United States, serving from 1877 to 1881. He served as Cincinnati's city solicitor from 1858 to 1861 and was known as a staunch abolitionist who defended refugee slaves in court proceedings. At the start of the Civil War, Hayes left a fledgling political career to join the Union army. He was wounded five times, most seriously at the Battle of South Mountain in 1862. Hayes earned a reputation for bravery in combat, rising in the ranks to serve as brevet major general. Hayes served in Congress from 1865 to 1867 and was elected governor of Ohio, serving two consecutive terms from 1868 to 1872 and half of a third two-year term from 1876 to 1877 before his swearing-in as president. In office he aligned himself with the reform-minded "Half-Breed" faction of the Republican Party, which broke with the patronage politics of Roscoe Conkling's Stalwarts.

Hayes served as the 19th president of the United States from March 4, 1877, to March 4, 1881. Hayes, a Republican, took office after his narrow electoral college victory in the 1876 presidential election. The dispute was settled by what historians have traditionally called the Compromise of 1877; Hayes withdrew the remaining federal troops from the Southern United States, and his inauguration is conventionally taken to mark the end of the Reconstruction era. Hayes declined to seek re-election and was succeeded by James A. Garfield.

Bibliography contains academic level English language books (including translations) and journal articles, published mainly post World War II. (Note: Works published before World War II should be limited to areas where there are no significant post-World War II books on the subject or when the work in question has significant historical merit.) Book entries may have references to reviews published in academic journals or major newspapers when these could be considered helpful. These reference reviews also function as a resource to find other works on this subject.

Works listed here are cited in the notes or bibliographies of scholarly sources. Each is published by an academic or major trade press, written by a recognized expert, or substantially reviewed in scholarly journals; borderline cases are omitted. A selection of primary sources is included. Many of the books below carry their own bibliographies; see Further reading section for longer ones, and External links section for historical sites and museums.

Citations follow APA style. (Note: Entries are in plain text APA 7 format without templates; templates are used only for reviews and notes.) Books have citations to academic journal or mainstream published reviews when available. For books only partly about the subject, give relevant chapter or section titles where useful and available. Translators of the original-language edition are included when possible. In cases where a title or name has appeared with more than one English spelling, the most recent published form is used and a footnote documents any earlier title under which the work appeared.

== General biographies ==
- Barnard, H. (1954). Rutherford B. Hayes and his America. Bobbs-Merrill.
- Hoogenboom, A. (1995). Rutherford B. Hayes: Warrior and president. University Press of Kansas.
- Peskin, A. (2014). Rutherford B. Hayes: The road to the White House. In E. O. Frantz (Ed.), A companion to the Reconstruction presidents 1865–1881 (pp. 403–414). Wiley-Blackwell. doi:10.1002/9781118607879.ch20
- Trefousse, H. L. (2002). Rutherford B. Hayes. Times Books.
- Williams, C. R. (1914). The life of Rutherford Birchard Hayes, nineteenth president of the United States. Houghton Mifflin.

== Life before the presidency and family ==
- Arrington, B. T. (2016). Lucy Webb Hayes, Lucretia Rudolph Garfield, and Mary Arthur McElroy. In K. A. S. Sibley (Ed.), A companion to First Ladies (pp. 247–264). Wiley-Blackwell. doi:10.1002/9781118732250.ch15
- Geer, E. A. (1979). The role of Lucy Webb Hayes in the Civil War. The Great Lakes Review, 6(1), 1–16. JSTOR 20172469
- Geer, E. A. (1984). First lady: The life of Lucy Webb Hayes. Kent State University Press.
- Parker, W. W. (1953). Rutherford B. Hayes as a student of speech at Kenyon College. Quarterly Journal of Speech, 39(3), 291–295. doi:10.1080/00335635309381880
- Williams, T. H. (1994). Hayes of the Twenty-Third: The Civil War volunteer officer. University of Nebraska Press.

== Presidency ==
- Anderson, D. L. (1978). The diplomacy of discrimination: Chinese exclusion, 1876–1882. California History, 57(1), 32–45. JSTOR 25157814
- Bassett, J. S. (1918). The significance of the administration of Rutherford B. Hayes. South Atlantic Quarterly, 17(3), 198–206. doi:10.1215/00382876-17-3-198
- Baur, J. E. (1955). A president visits Los Angeles: Rutherford B. Hayes' tour of 1880. The Historical Society of Southern California Quarterly, 37(1), 33–47. JSTOR 41168522
- Benedict, M. L. (1980). Southern Democrats in the crisis of 1876–1877: A reconsideration of Reunion and Reaction. The Journal of Southern History, 46(4), 489–524. JSTOR 2207200
- Davison, K. E. (1972). The presidency of Rutherford B. Hayes. Greenwood Press.
- De Santis, V. P. (1955). President Hayes's Southern policy. The Journal of Southern History, 21(4), 476–494. JSTOR 2955049
- Deacon, K. (2011). On the road with Rutherford B. Hayes: Oregon's first presidential visit, 1880. Oregon Historical Quarterly, 112(2), 170–193. doi:10.1353/ohq.2011.0030
- Haworth, P. L. (1906). The Hayes-Tilden disputed presidential election of 1876. Burrows Brothers.
- Holt, M. F. (2008). By one vote: The disputed presidential election of 1876. University Press of Kansas.
- Hoogenboom, A. (1988). The presidency of Rutherford B. Hayes. University Press of Kansas.
- Hoogenboom, A. (2014). Hayes and civil service reform. In E. O. Frantz (Ed.), A companion to the Reconstruction presidents 1865–1881 (pp. 431–451). Wiley-Blackwell. doi:10.1002/9781118607879.ch22
- Howe, G. F. (1931). The New York Custom-House controversy, 1877–1879. The Mississippi Valley Historical Review, 18(3), 350–363. JSTOR 1891404
- Lew-Williams, B. (2014). Before restriction became exclusion: America's experiment in diplomatic immigration control. Pacific Historical Review, 83(1), 24–56. doi:10.1525/phr.2014.83.1.24
- McPherson, J. M. (1966). Coercion or conciliation? Abolitionists debate President Hayes's Southern policy. The New England Quarterly, 39(4), 474–497. JSTOR 363419
- Morris, R., Jr. (2003). Fraud of the century: Rutherford B. Hayes, Samuel Tilden, and the stolen election of 1876. Simon & Schuster.
- Palen, M.-W. (2014). Election of 1876/Compromise of 1877. In E. O. Frantz (Ed.), A companion to the Reconstruction presidents 1865–1881 (pp. 415–430). Wiley-Blackwell. doi:10.1002/9781118607879.ch21
- Peskin, A. (1973). Was there a compromise of 1877. The Journal of American History, 60(1), 63–75. JSTOR 2936329
- Polakoff, K. I. (1973). The politics of inertia: The election of 1876 and the end of Reconstruction. Louisiana State University Press.
- Rehnquist, W. H. (2004). Centennial crisis: The disputed election of 1876. Alfred A. Knopf.
- Richardson, L. N., & Garrison, C. W. (1945). George William Curtis, Rutherford B. Hayes, and civil service reform. The Mississippi Valley Historical Review, 32(2), 235–250. JSTOR 1898211
- Ross, M. A. (2016). Rutherford B. Hayes. In K. Gormley (Ed.), The presidents and the Constitution: A living history (pp. 253–265). New York University Press. doi:10.18574/nyu/9781479872077.003.0022
- Sternstein, J. L. (1966). The Sickles memorandum: Another look at the Hayes-Tilden election-night conspiracy. The Journal of Southern History, 32(3), 342–357. JSTOR 2204793
- Thelen, D. P. (1970). Rutherford B. Hayes and the reform tradition in the Gilded Age. American Quarterly, 22(2), 150–165. JSTOR 2711639
- Timberlake, R. H., Jr. (1964). Ideological factors in specie resumption and Treasury policy. The Journal of Economic History, 24(1), 29–52. doi:10.1017/s0022050700089877
- Trefousse, H. L. (1984). Carl Schurz and the Indians. Great Plains Quarterly, 4(2), 109–120.
- Unger, I. (1959). Business men and specie resumption. Political Science Quarterly, 74(1), 46–70. JSTOR 2145940
- Vazzano, F. P. (2006). Rutherford B. Hayes and the politics of discord. The Historian, 68(3), 519–540. doi:10.1111/j.1540-6563.2006.00157.x
- Walker, A. N. (2016). The historical presidency: "The fibre of which presidents ought to be made": Union busting from Rutherford Hayes to Scott Walker. Presidential Studies Quarterly, 46(1), 194–207. doi:10.1111/psq.12258
- Woodward, C. V. (1951). Reunion and reaction: The compromise of 1877 and the end of Reconstruction. Little, Brown.

== Post-presidency ==
- Frantz, E. O. (2014). Ex-presidents in the age of Reconstruction. In E. O. Frantz (Ed.), A companion to the Reconstruction presidents 1865–1881 (pp. 601–616). Wiley-Blackwell. doi:10.1002/9781118607879.ch30
- Garrison, C. W. (1939). Slater Fund beginnings: Letters from General Agent Atticus G. Haygood to Rutherford B. Hayes. The Journal of Southern History, 5(2), 223–245. JSTOR 2191584
- Swint, H. L. (1952). Rutherford B. Hayes, educator. The Mississippi Valley Historical Review, 39(1), 45–60. JSTOR 1902843

== Background ==
- Bruce, R. V. (1959). 1877: Year of violence. Bobbs-Merrill.
- De Santis, V. P. (1959). Republicans face the Southern question: The new departure years, 1877–1897. Johns Hopkins Press.
- Foner, P. S. (1977). The great labor uprising of 1877. Monad Press.
- Frantz, E. O. (2011). The door of hope: Republican presidents and the first Southern strategy, 1877–1933. University Press of Florida.
- Gillette, W. (1979). Retreat from Reconstruction, 1869–1879. Louisiana State University Press.
- Gyory, A. (1998). Closing the gate: Race, politics, and the Chinese Exclusion Act. University of North Carolina Press.
- Hoogenboom, A. (1961). Outlawing the spoils: A history of the civil service reform movement, 1865–1883. University of Illinois Press.
- Hoogenboom, A. (1961). Thomas A. Jenckes and civil service reform. The Mississippi Valley Historical Review, 47(4), 636–658. JSTOR 1889602
- Jordan, D. M. (1971). Roscoe Conkling of New York: Voice in the Senate. Cornell University Press.
- O'Connor, K., Nye, B., & Van Assendelft, L. (1996). Wives in the White House: The political influence of First Ladies. Presidential Studies Quarterly, 26(3), 835–853. JSTOR 27551636
- Roediger, D. R. (1985). "Not only the ruling classes to overcome, but also the so-called mob": Class, skill and community in the St. Louis general strike of 1877. Journal of Social History, 19(2), 213–239. doi:10.1353/jsh/19.2.213
- Rondinone, T. (2007). "History repeats itself": The Civil War and the meaning of labor conflict in the late nineteenth century. American Quarterly, 59(2), 397–419. doi:10.1353/aq.2007.0046
- Salvatore, N. (1980). Railroad workers and the great strike of 1877: The view from a small Midwest city. Labor History, 21(4), 522–545. doi:10.1080/00236568008584596
- Stowell, D. O. (1995). Small property holders and the Great Strike of 1877: Railroads, city streets, and the middle classes. Journal of Urban History, 21(6), 741–763. doi:10.1177/009614429502100603
- Stowell, D. O. (1999). Streets, railroads, and the Great Strike of 1877. University of Chicago Press.
- Unger, I. (1964). The greenback era: A social and political history of American finance, 1865–1879. Princeton University Press.
- Weinstein, A. (1970). Prelude to populism: Origins of the silver issue, 1867–1878. Yale University Press.

== Historiography ==
- Calhoun, C. W. (1999). Major party conflict in the Gilded Age: A hundred years of interpretation. OAH Magazine of History, 13(4), 5–10. doi:10.1093/maghis/13.4.5
- Calhoun, C. W. (2002). Reimagining the "lost men" of the Gilded Age: Perspectives on the late nineteenth century presidents. The Journal of the Gilded Age and Progressive Era, 1(3), 225–257. doi:10.1017/s1537781400000244

== Primary sources ==
- Williams, C. R. (Ed.). (1922–1926). Diary and letters of Rutherford Birchard Hayes, nineteenth president of the United States (Vols. 1–5). Ohio State Archaeological and Historical Society.
- Williams, T. H. (Ed.). (1964). Hayes: The diary of a president, 1875–1881. David McKay.

== See also ==
- Angell Treaty of 1880 – US-China treaty on immigration
- Bland–Allison Act – 1878 United States law on monetary policy
- Specie Payment Resumption Act – 1875 law in the US
