= 1876 Florida gubernatorial election =

- November 7, 1876
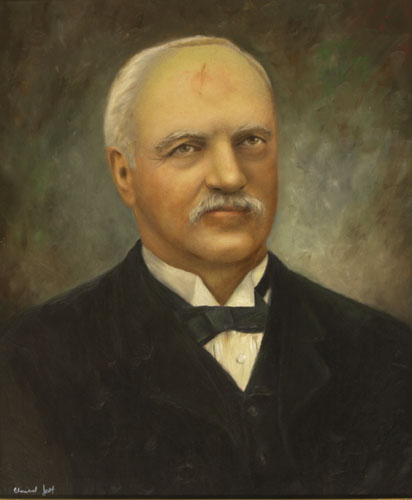

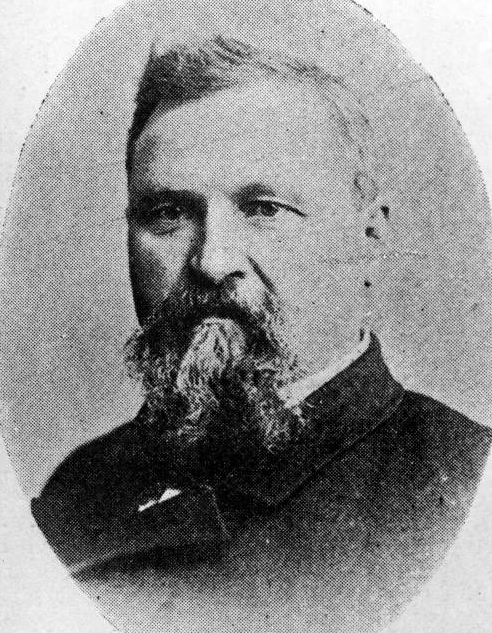
| Nominee | George F. Drew | Marcellus L. Stearns |
| Party | Democratic | Republican |
| Popular vote | 24,613 | 24,116 |
| Percentage | 50.51% | 49.49% |

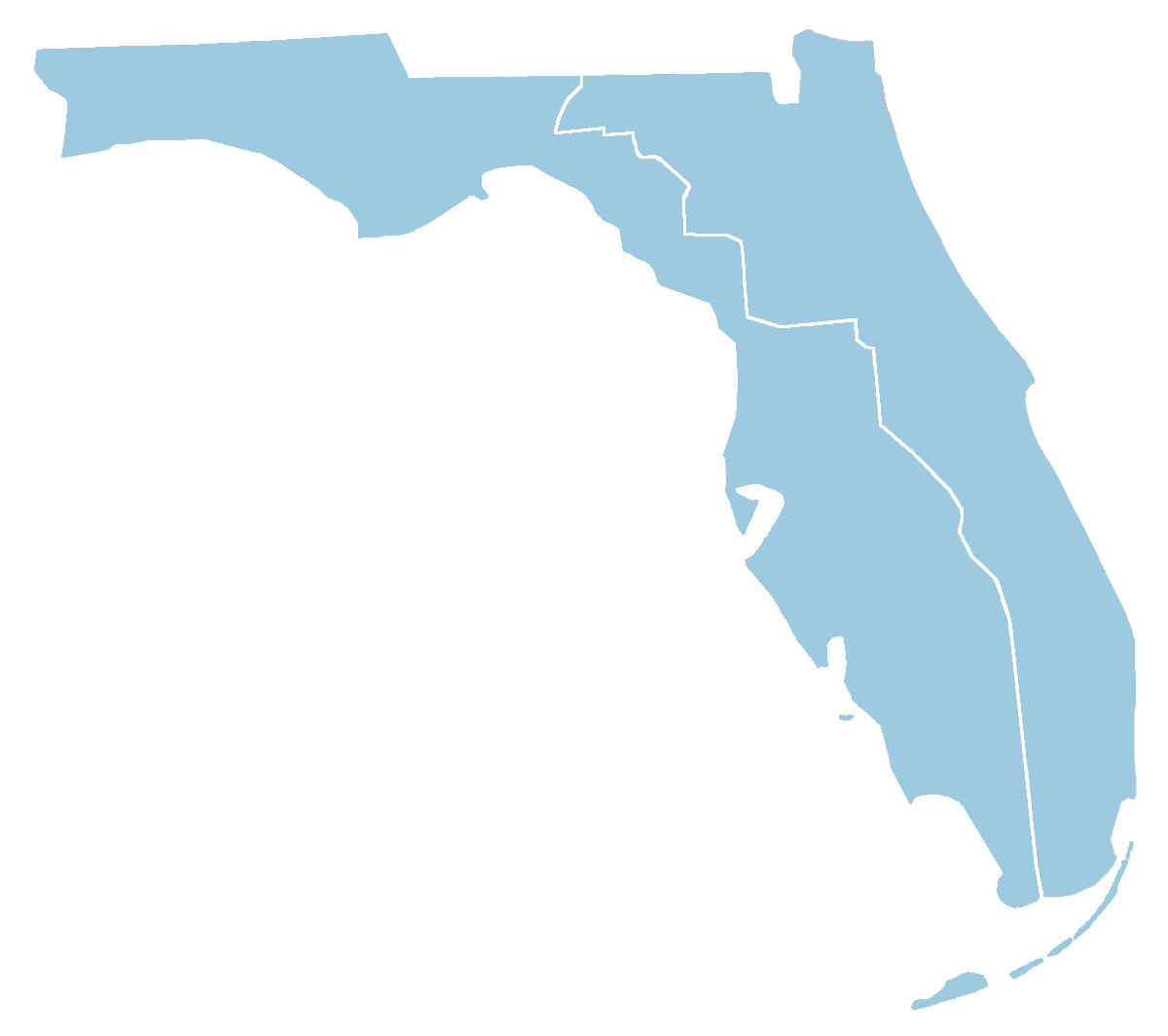
Drew
50–60%
60–70%
70–80%
80–90%
>90%
Stearns
50–60%
60–70%
70–80%
Governor before election
Marcellus L. Stearns
Republican
Elected Governor
George F. Drew
Democratic

The 1876 Florida gubernatorial election was held on November 7, 1876. Democratic nominee George F. Drew narrowly defeated Republican incumbent Marcellus L. Stearns with 50.51% of the vote. This started a 90-year streak of losses for the Republican Party in Florida, and they would not regain the governorship until 1966.

== General election ==
=== Candidates ===
==== Democratic ====
- George F. Drew

==== Republican ====
- Marcellus L. Stearns

=== Results ===
1876 Florida gubernatorial election
| Party | Candidate | Votes | % | ±% |
|---|---|---|---|---|
| Democratic | George F. Drew | 24,613 | 50.51% | |
| Republican | Marcellus L. Stearns | 24,116 | 49.49% | |

==== Results by county ====
| County | George F. Drew Democratic | | Marcellus L. Stearns Republican | | Total votes |
| County | # | % | # | % | Total votes |
|---|---|---|---|---|---|
| Alachua | 1,260 | 38.92% | 1,977 | 61.08% | 3,237 |
| Baker | 236 | 62.43% | 142 | 37.57% | 378 |
| Bradford | 701 | 77.63% | 202 | 22.37% | 903 |
| Brevard | 104 | 62.28% | 63 | 37.72% | 167 |
| Calhoun | 217 | 79.20% | 57 | 20.80% | 274 |
| Clay | 287 | 70.52% | 120 | 29.48% | 407 |
| Columbia | 902 | 55.68% | 718 | 44.32% | 1,620 |
| Dade | 5 | 38.46% | 8 | 61.54% | 13 |
| Duval | 1,502 | 39.53% | 2,298 | 60.47% | 3,800 |
| Escambia | 1,431 | 47.40% | 1,588 | 52.60% | 3,019 |
| Franklin | 174 | 67.18% | 85 | 32.82% | 259 |
| Gadsden | 840 | 39.31% | 1,297 | 60.69% | 2,137 |
| Hamilton | 614 | 65.32% | 326 | 34.68% | 940 |
| Hernando | 583 | 81.31% | 134 | 18.69% | 717 |
| Hillsborough | 794 | 81.35% | 182 | 18.65% | 976 |
| Holmes | 300 | 94.94% | 16 | 5.06% | 316 |
| Jackson | 1,397 | 51.89% | 1,295 | 48.11% | 2,692 |
| Jefferson | 737 | 21.70% | 2,659 | 78.30% | 3,396 |
| Lafayette | 310 | 83.33% | 62 | 16.67% | 372 |
| Leon | 1,010 | 25.01% | 3,029 | 74.99% | 4,039 |
| Levy | 492 | 70.39% | 207 | 29.61% | 699 |
| Liberty | 147 | 63.91% | 83 | 36.09% | 230 |
| Madison | 1,082 | 41.62% | 1,518 | 58.38% | 2,600 |
| Manatee | 262 | 90.66% | 27 | 9.34% | 289 |
| Marion | 963 | 38.37% | 1,547 | 61.63% | 2,510 |
| Monroe | 1,052 | 51.98% | 972 | 48.02% | 2,024 |
| Nassau | 677 | 46.12% | 791 | 53.88% | 1,468 |
| Orange | 930 | 83.63% | 182 | 16.37% | 1,112 |
| Polk | 443 | 97.36% | 12 | 2.64% | 455 |
| Putnam | 619 | 51.89% | 574 | 48.11% | 1,193 |
| Santa Rosa | 773 | 65.56% | 406 | 34.44% | 1,179 |
| St. Johns | 504 | 60.07% | 335 | 39.93% | 839 |
| Sumter | 511 | 75.15% | 169 | 24.85% | 680 |
| Suwannee | 629 | 58.03% | 455 | 41.97% | 1,084 |
| Taylor | 243 | 77.14% | 72 | 22.86% | 315 |
| Volusia | 480 | 74.88% | 161 | 25.12% | 641 |
| Wakulla | 363 | 66.85% | 180 | 33.15% | 543 |
| Walton | 634 | 93.24% | 46 | 6.76% | 680 |
| Washington | 405 | 77.0% | 121 | 23.0% | 526 |
| Totals | 24,613 | 50.51% | 24,116 | 49.49% | 48,729 |

Counties that flipped from Republican to Democratic

- Columbia
- Jackson

== See also ==
- 1876 United States presidential election in Florida
- 1876 United States House of Representatives elections in Florida
