= 1868 State of the Union Address =

Speech by US President Andrew Johnson

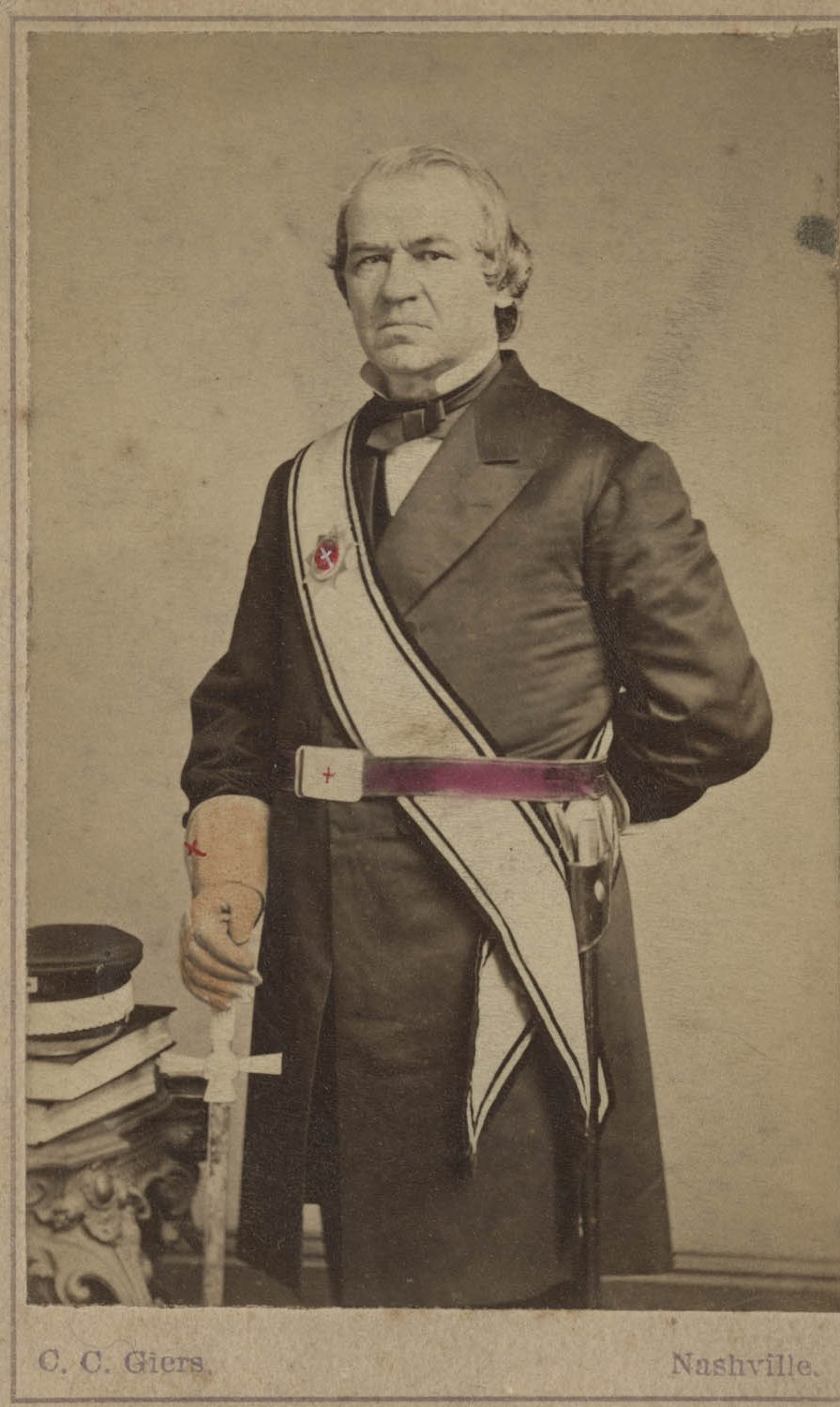
- Johnson c. 1869 in Masonic regalia, photographed by Carl Giers
- Date: December 9, 1868
- Venue: House Chamber, United States Capitol
- Type: State of the Union Address
- Participants: Andrew Johnson; Benjamin Wade; Schuyler Colfax
- Format: Written
- Previous: 1867 State of the Union Address
- Next: 1869 State of the Union Address

The 1868 State of the Union, was delivered by Andrew Johnson, 17th president of the United States, to the United States Congress on December 9, 1868. Members of the U.S. Senate, the upper house of the bicameral American national legislature, interrupted the reading of the message to pass a motion that it not be read on the floor; members of the lower House of Representatives listened to the written address but passed a motion that it should not be printed at government expense or referred to any committee. The major policy proposal made in the message by lame duck Johnson was that the U.S. government should repudiate bond repayment obligations resulting from the expense of the American Civil War.

== Content and reception ==
The written message was by Andrew Johnson, the president of the United States. Leading up to the message, the Philadelphia Press wrote, "As the end approaches, Andrew Johnson will have ample time to compare notes with himself. He may run a safe parallel with the long line of miscreant Vice Presidents, beginning with Burr and ending with Breckinridge, and may read in the blaze of Grant's resplendent victory, the fulfilled prophecy of those who insisted that his course would terminate exactly like theirs. His last chance for self-vindication will be presented in his coming annual message, wherein, if he is half as candid as he has been perfidious, he may at least rescue himself from utter shame, by confessing that his administration has been as great a blunder, and nearly as great a crime, as the rebellion itself." It was not to be. When the message was released, the New York Times commented, "Mr. JOHNSON'S Message is not of the pacificatory sort. It will not extort admiration from his opponents, or elicit expressions of regret at the approaching close of his official career," and criticized Johnson's use of the platform for repetitious bellyaching about Congress' Reconstruction policy and the recently concluded impeachment trial, stating, "Stubbornness is not statesmanship, as he should have learned before now." The Chicago Post commented, "Andrew Johnson's message, stolen by somebody in advance of its delivery (and a very poor steal at that), will be found on the inside of this paper. We regret to cumber our columns with so much unprofitable reading, but, thank Heaven! it is Andy's last howl."

The members of U.S. Senate actually interrupted the reading of the message to consider a motion that it not be read aloud to the legislature, on the basis that it was abusive dreck, and the motion passed. In the House of Representatives, as told by a Wisconsin newspaper, "the message was read through, severely denounced, and laid upon the table with other dead matter by a vote of 128 to 88, the House refusing to have the message printed or referred to the appropriate comtittees. No message was ever so received by Congress and no Congress ever received such a message. The production is as disgraceful to the country as any of Johnson's performances, not excepting the inauguration scene or the swing around the circle." The Wheeling Intelligencer commented, "Mr. Johnson leaves the country very little room to doubt the paternity of his message. Its style is vigorously Johnsonian. He has recovered the combativeness which was frightened out of him at the time of the Impeachment trial. He fears Ben Butler and Bingham and Boutwell's hole in the sky no longer. He sails into Congress and its reconstruction policy in the very opening sentences. He takes nothing back that he has ever said on that topic. He repeats his denunciations for the twenty-ninth time with as much confidence as if they were something quite new and fresh, and as if there had not been a national election in which the people to whom he had so often appealed decided against his 'policy' and its favor of the policy of Congress. It is evident there is a great deal of Bourbon (Note: The use of Bourbon here is a reference is both Bourbon whiskey (and the Andrew Johnson alcoholism debate) and the Bourbon dynasty of France, which was overthrown and then returned, without making any substantial changes in response to the revolution, several times; this double entendre is the basis for the American political term Bourbon Democrat.) in Mr. Johnson—he neither learns nor forgets. What monotonous reading his messages will be when they are bound up in one book."

The major policy proposal in the address was a suggested repudiation of federal debt resulting from the American Civil War; he suggested the government to simply retire the bonds. In an unsubtle repackaging of the Democratic Party rhetoric on the debt issue, Johnson claimed to think the bond holders were both greedy and unpatriotic in their expectation that they be repaid with interest, and in gold no less, rather than the less-trusted greenback paper currency, writing, "The lessons of the past admonish the lender that it is not well to be over anxious in exacting from the borrower rigid compliance with the letter of the bond." Congress promptly responded with legislation guaranteeing that "the Government would pay all bonds in coin. Johnson refused to sign it, and the act failed to become law through a pocket veto." After Grant was inaugurated, the Congress passed and the President signed the Public Credit Act of 1869 to the same effect.

== See also ==
- WikiSource: Andrew Johnson's Fourth State of the Union
- List of State of the Union addresses

== Notes ==
Preceded by 1867 State of the Union Address	State of the Union addresses 1868	Succeeded by 1869 State of the Union Address
