= 1956 United States presidential election in Louisiana =

- November 6, 1956

All 10 Louisiana votes to the Electoral College

Nominee	Dwight D. Eisenhower	Adlai Stevenson	Unpledged electors
Party	Republican	Democratic	Dixiecrat
Home state	Pennsylvania (Note: Although he was born in Texas and grew up in Kansas before his military career, at the time of the 1952 election Eisenhower was president of Columbia University and was, officially, a resident of New York. During his first term as president, he moved his private residence to Gettysburg, Pennsylvania, and officially changed his residency to Pennsylvania.)	Illinois
Running mate	Richard Nixon	Estes Kefauver
Electoral vote	10	0	0
Popular vote	329,047	243,977	44,520
Percentage	53.28%	39.51%	7.21%
Parish results
Eisenhower
30–40%
40–50%
50–60%
60–70%
80–90%
Stevenson
30–40%
40–50%
50–60%
Unpledged
30–40%
40–50%
50–60%
President before election
Dwight D. Eisenhower
Republican
Elected President
Dwight D. Eisenhower
Republican

The 1956 United States presidential election in Louisiana took place on November 6, 1956, as part of the 1956 United States presidential election. State voters chose ten representatives, or electors, to the Electoral College, who voted for president and vice president.

Louisiana was won by incumbent President Dwight D. Eisenhower (R–Pennsylvania), running with Vice President Richard Nixon, with 53.28% of the popular vote, against Adlai Stevenson (D–Illinois), running with Senator Estes Kefauver, with 39.51% of the popular vote.

This was the first time that a Republican presidential candidate won Louisiana or indeed any Deep South state since Rutherford B. Hayes in 1876. Along with Kentucky and West Virginia, Louisiana was one of 3 states that Dwight Eisenhower lost in 1952, but managed to flip in 1956.

== Results ==
1956 United States presidential election in Louisiana
Party	Candidate	Votes	%
Republican	Dwight D. Eisenhower (inc.)	329,047	53.28%
Democratic	Adlai Stevenson	243,977	39.51%
Dixiecrat	Unpledged electors	44,520	7.21%
Total votes		617,544	100%

=== Results by parish ===
Parish	Dwight D. Eisenhower Republican		Adlai Stevenson Democratic		Unpledged electors States’ Rights		Margin		Total votes cast
Parish	#	%	#	%	#	%	#	%	Total votes cast
Acadia	4,204	39.97%	6,122	58.21%	191	1.82%	1,918	18.24%	10,517
Allen	2,469	50.46%	2,284	46.68%	140	2.86%	185	3.78%	4,893
Ascension	1,853	40.86%	2,606	57.46%	76	1.68%	-753	-16.60%	4,535
Assumption	1,708	55.17%	1,282	41.41%	106	3.42%	426	13.76%	3,096
Avoyelles	3,255	44.47%	3,628	49.57%	436	5.96%	-373	-5.10%	7,319
Beauregard	2,711	52.68%	2,276	44.23%	159	3.09%	435	8.45%	5,146
Bienville	1,515	48.87%	815	26.29%	770	24.84%	700	22.58%	3,100
Bossier	3,107	48.97%	1,954	30.80%	1,284	20.24%	1,153	18.17%	6,345
Caddo	23,432	60.32%	10,780	27.75%	4,637	11.94%	12,652	32.57%	38,849
Calcasieu	13,760	51.47%	12,255	45.84%	718	2.69%	1,505	5.63%	26,733
Caldwell	587	35.17%	468	28.04%	614	36.79%	-27 (Note: In this parish where Stevenson ran third behind both Eisenhower and the unpledged slate, margin given is Eisenhower vote minus unpledged vote and percentage margin Eisenhower percentage minus unpledged percentage.)	-1.62%	1,669
Cameron	547	40.22%	794	58.38%	19	1.40%	-247	-18.16%	1,360
Catahoula	845	46.89%	707	39.23%	250	13.87%	138	7.66%	1,802
Claiborne	2,084	53.63%	810	20.84%	992	25.53%	1,092	28.10%	3,886
Concordia	841	39.74%	699	33.03%	576	27.22%	142	6.71%	2,116
DeSoto	2,011	53.33%	1,206	31.98%	554	14.69%	805	21.35%	3,771
East Baton Rouge	24,018	56.74%	17,072	40.33%	1,241	2.93%	6,946	16.41%	42,331
East Carroll	415	30.81%	545	40.46%	387	28.73%	-130	-9.65%	1,347
East Feliciana	912	37.45%	1,304	53.55%	219	8.99%	-392	-16.10%	2,435
Evangeline	2,170	38.20%	3,336	58.73%	174	3.06%	-1,166	-20.53%	5,680
Franklin	1,130	32.69%	1,352	39.11%	975	28.20%	-222	-6.42%	3,457
Grant	1,630	46.06%	1,542	43.57%	367	10.37%	88	2.49%	3,539
Iberia	6,733	63.43%	3,544	33.39%	338	3.18%	3,189	30.04%	10,615
Iberville	1,843	46.97%	2,018	51.43%	63	1.61%	-175	-4.46%	3,924
Jackson	1,553	54.26%	916	32.01%	393	13.73%	637	22.25%	2,862
Jefferson	24,324	57.23%	16,577	39.01%	1,598	3.76%	7,747	18.22%	42,499
Jefferson Davis	4,170	62.93%	2,346	35.41%	110	1.66%	1,824	27.52%	6,626
Lafayette	6,711	57.10%	4,695	39.95%	347	2.95%	2,016	17.15%	11,753
Lafourche	5,741	60.25%	3,466	36.38%	321	3.37%	2,275	23.87%	9,528
LaSalle	1,885	61.56%	951	31.06%	226	7.38%	934	30.50%	3,062
Lincoln	2,676	59.20%	1,014	22.43%	830	18.36%	1,662	36.77%	4,520
Livingston	1,628	37.24%	2,571	58.81%	173	3.96%	-943	-21.57%	4,372
Madison	461	27.25%	276	16.31%	955	56.44%	-494	-29.19%	1,692
Morehouse	1,850	35.70%	1,512	29.18%	1,820	35.12%	30	0.58%	5,182
Natchitoches	3,203	55.51%	2,028	35.15%	539	9.34%	1,175	20.36%	5,770
Orleans	93,082	56.54%	64,958	39.46%	6,594	4.01%	28,124	17.08%	164,634
Ouachita	7,094	46.80%	4,372	28.84%	3,692	24.36%	2,722	17.96%	15,158
Plaquemines	2,998	81.20%	534	14.46%	160	4.33%	2,464	66.74%	3,692
Pointe Coupee	1,332	45.03%	1,542	52.13%	84	2.84%	-210	-7.10%	2,958
Rapides	9,105	53.84%	5,961	35.25%	1,845	10.91%	3,144	18.59%	16,911
Red River	661	36.97%	803	44.91%	324	18.12%	-142	-7.94%	1,788
Richland	1,063	29.88%	1,094	30.76%	1,400	39.36%	-306 (Note: In this parish where Eisenhower ran third behind both Stevenson and the unpledged slate, margin given is Stevenson vote minus unpledged vote and percentage margin Stevenson percentage minus unpledged percentage.)	-8.60%	3,557
Sabine	2,086	50.46%	1,800	43.54%	248	6.00%	286	6.92%	4,134
St. Bernard	3,648	50.55%	3,283	45.49%	286	3.96%	365	5.06%	7,217
St. Charles	2,417	57.86%	1,671	40.00%	89	2.13%	746	17.86%	4,177
St. Helena	545	32.27%	997	59.03%	147	8.70%	-452	-26.76%	1,689
St. James	1,849	49.19%	1,832	48.74%	78	2.08%	17	0.45%	3,759
St. John the Baptist	1,372	50.55%	1,278	47.09%	64	2.36%	94	3.46%	2,714
St. Landry	5,141	51.56%	4,435	44.48%	394	3.95%	706	7.08%	9,970
St. Martin	1,615	42.72%	2,069	54.74%	96	2.54%	-454	-12.02%	3,780
St. Mary	4,097	61.49%	2,395	35.94%	171	2.57%	1,702	25.55%	6,663
St. Tammany	3,965	51.90%	3,373	44.15%	301	3.94%	592	7.75%	7,639
Tangipahoa	5,788	51.75%	4,831	43.19%	566	5.06%	957	8.56%	11,185
Tensas	359	34.99%	324	31.58%	343	33.43%	16	1.56%	1,026
Terrebonne	4,983	64.85%	2,460	32.01%	241	3.14%	2,523	32.84%	7,684
Union	1,384	40.49%	878	25.69%	1,156	33.82%	228	6.67%	3,418
Vermilion	3,877	44.59%	4,564	52.49%	254	2.92%	-687	-7.90%	8,695
Vernon	2,372	49.81%	2,158	45.32%	232	4.87%	214	4.49%	4,762
Washington	3,081	38.29%	4,658	57.88%	308	3.83%	-1,577	-19.59%	8,047
Webster	3,280	48.72%	2,352	34.93%	1,101	16.35%	928	13.79%	6,733
West Baton Rouge	1,035	44.73%	1,208	52.20%	71	3.07%	-173	-7.47%	2,314
West Carroll	658	25.10%	875	33.37%	1,089	41.53%	-214	-8.16%	2,622
West Feliciana	442	56.38%	296	37.76%	46	5.87%	146	18.62%	784
Winn	1,736	49.56%	1,225	34.97%	542	15.47%	511	14.59%	3,503
Totals	329,047	53.28%	243,977	39.51%	44,520	7.21%	85,070	13.77%	617,544

==== Parishes that flipped from Democratic to Republican ====
- Allen
- Acadia
- Beauregard
- Assumption
- Calcasieu
- Catahoula
- Concordia
- East Baton Rouge
- Grant
- Jackson
- Jefferson Davis
- Jefferson
- Lafourche
- LaSalle
- Morehouse
- Natchitoches
- Orleans
- Ouachita
- Rapides
- Sabine
- St. Charles
- St. James
- St. John the Baptist
- St. Tammany
- Tangipahoa
- Terrebonne
- Vernon
- Union
- Webster
- Winn

==== Parishes that flipped from Democratic to Unpledged ====
- Caldwell
- Richland
- West Carroll

==== Parishes that flipped from Republican to Unpledged ====
- Madison

== See also ==
- United States presidential elections in Louisiana
