= 1876 State of the Union Address =

Speech by US President Ulysses S. Grant

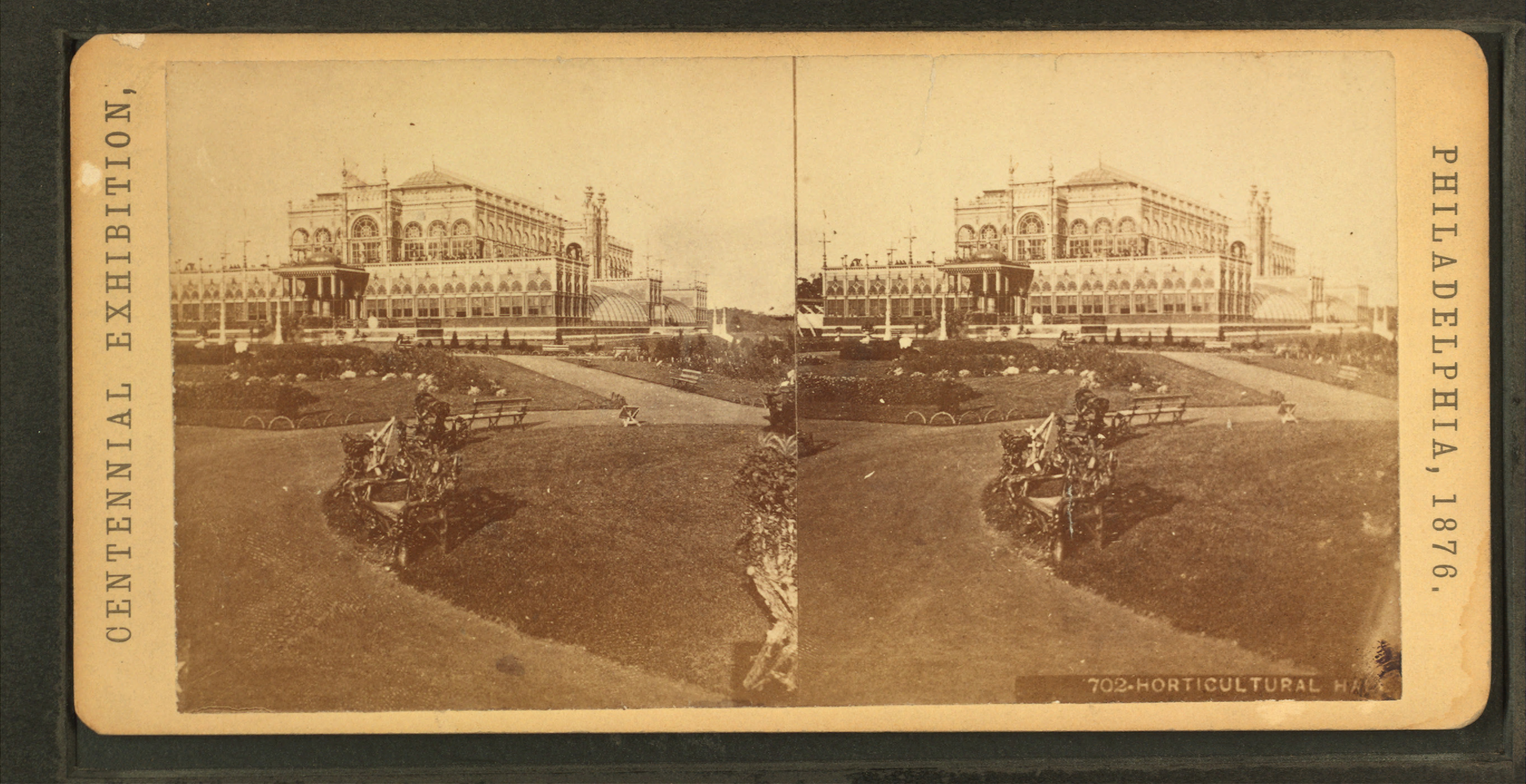
- Centennial exhibition, Philadelphia, 1876
- Date: December 5, 1876
- Venue: House Chamber, United States Capitol
- Location: Washington, D.C.; 38°53′23″N 77°00′32″W
- Type: State of the Union Address
- Participants: Ulysses S. Grant; Thomas W. Ferry; Samuel J. Randall
- Format: Written
- Previous: 1875 State of the Union Address
- Next: 1877 State of the Union Address

The 1876 State of the Union Address was given by the 18th president of the United States, Ulysses S. Grant, on Tuesday, December 5, 1876. In it he said these words, "Reconstruction Era, as finally agreed upon, means this and only this, except that the late slave was enfranchised, giving an increase, as was supposed, to the Union-loving and Union-supporting votes. If free in the full sense of the word, they would not disappoint this expectation. Hence at the beginning of my first Administration the work of reconstruction, much embarrassed by the long delay, virtually commenced."

In foreign policy matters, the President mentions the Reciprocity Treaty of 1875 with the Kingdom of Hawaii. In domestic matters the President hailed the success of the Centennial Exposition.

Preceded by 1875 State of the Union Address	State of the Union addresses 1876	Succeeded by 1877 State of the Union Address
