= 1876 United States presidential election in Louisiana =

- November 7, 1876
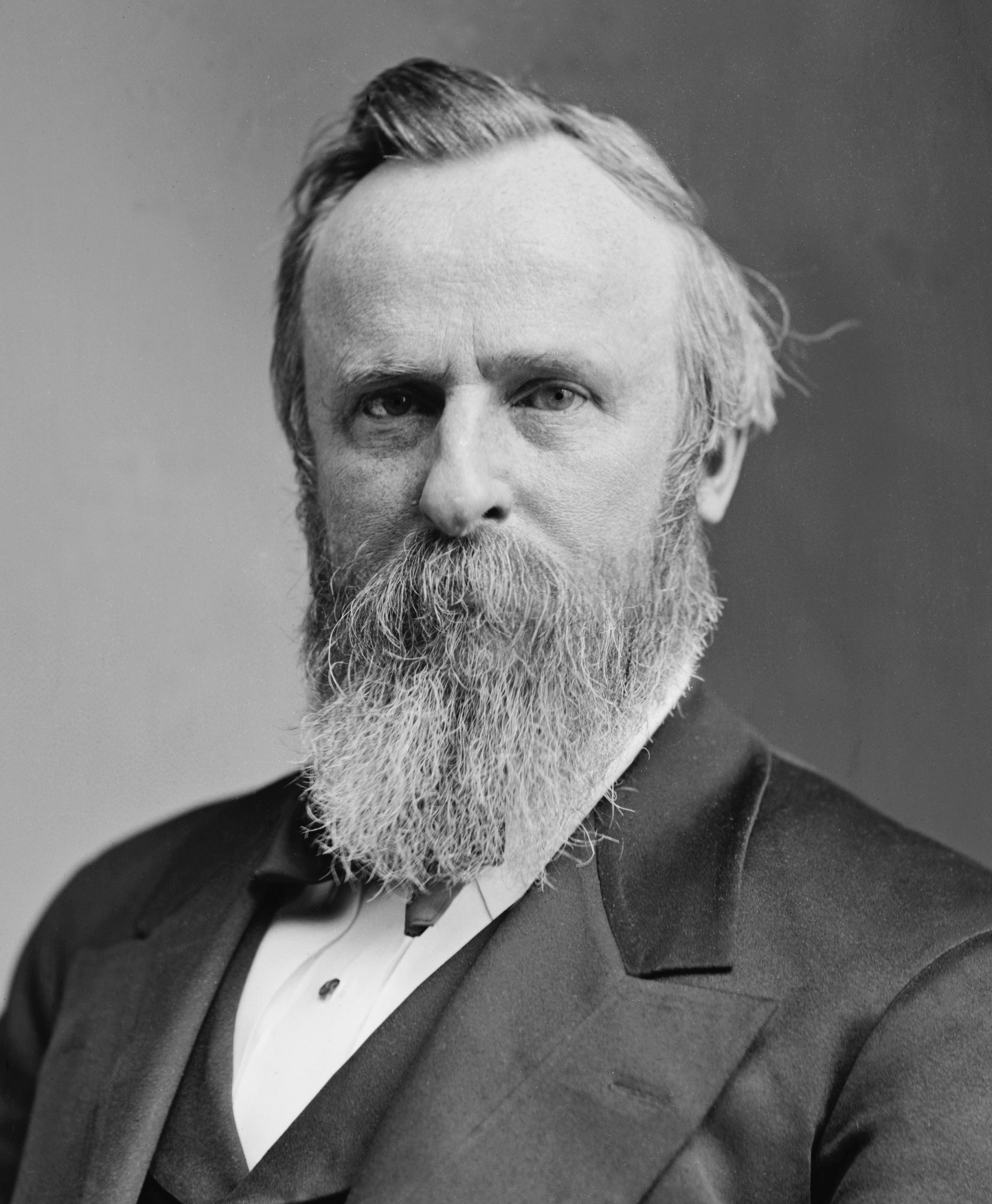

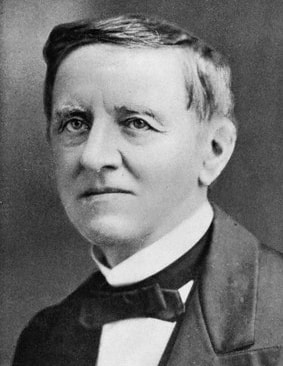
Nominee	Rutherford B. Hayes	Samuel J. Tilden
Party	Republican	Democratic
Home state	Ohio	New York
Running mate	William A. Wheeler	Thomas A. Hendricks
Electoral vote	8	0
Popular vote	75,315	70,508
Percentage	51.65%	48.35%
Parish results
Hayes
50–60%
60–70%
70–80%
80–90%
Tilden
50–60%
60–70%
70–80%
80–90%
90–100%
President before election
Ulysses S. Grant
Republican
Elected President
Rutherford B. Hayes
Republican

The 1876 United States presidential election in Louisiana took place on November 7, 1876, as part of the 1876 United States presidential election. Voters chose eight representatives, or electors to the Electoral College, who voted for president and vice president.

Louisiana was one of three states (along with Florida and South Carolina) in which the vote was disputed. On election night, the Democratic nominee, Samuel J. Tilden, led the Republican nominee, Rutherford B. Hayes, by 6,300 votes, but this was overturned by the Republican-controlled returning board, which threw out approximately 13,000 Democratic votes, along with 2,000 Republican votes, thus giving Hayes a majority. With the two parties sending opposing slates of electors to Washington, an Electoral Commission was formed to settle the results. This commission decided the three disputed states in favor of Hayes. Hayes won Louisiana by a narrow margin of 3.30%.

This would be the final presidential election where a Republican presidential candidate would win Louisiana until Dwight D. Eisenhower won the state in 1956.

== Results ==
1876 United States presidential election in Louisiana
Party	Candidate	Running mate	Popular vote		Electoral vote	
Party	Candidate	Running mate	Count	%	Count	%
Republican	Rutherford B. Hayes of Ohio	William A. Wheeler of New York	75,315	51.65%	8	100.00%
Democratic	Samuel J. Tilden of New York	Thomas A. Hendricks of Indiana	70,508	48.35%	0	100.00
Total			145,823	100.00%	8	100.00%

== See also ==
- United States presidential elections in Louisiana
