= 1876 United States presidential election in Florida =

- November 7, 1876
- Turnout: 24.92% ▲7.24 pp
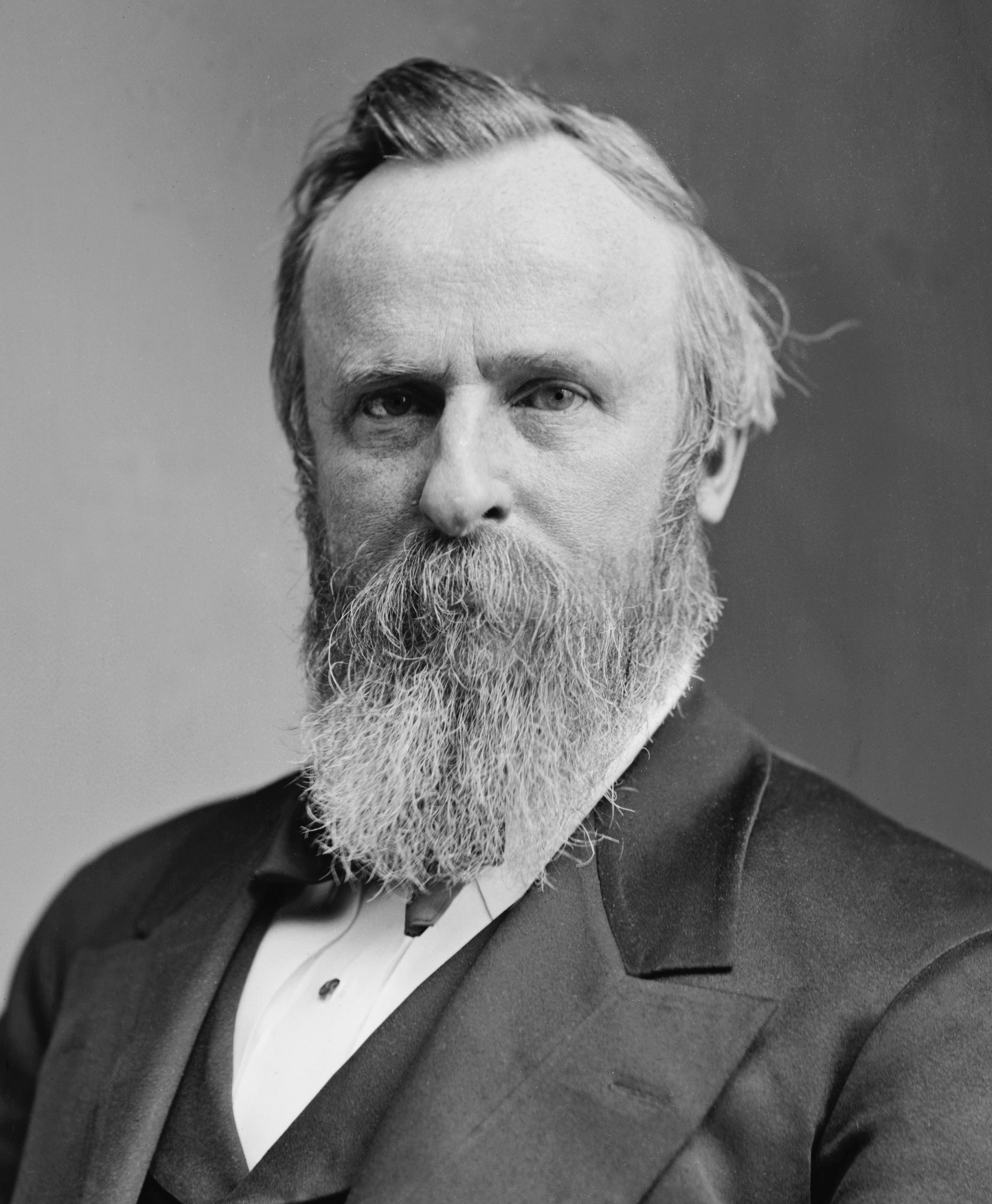

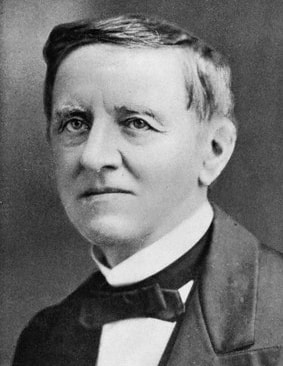
Nominee	Rutherford B. Hayes	Samuel J. Tilden
Party	Republican	Democratic
Home state	Ohio	New York
Running mate	William A. Wheeler	Thomas A. Hendricks
Electoral vote	4	0
Popular vote	23,849	22,927
Percentage	50.99%	49.01%
County results
Hayes
50–60%
60–70%
70–80%
Tilden
50–60%
60–70%
70–80%
80–90%
90–100%
President before election
Ulysses S. Grant
Republican
Elected President
Rutherford B. Hayes
Republican

The 1876 United States presidential election in Florida took place on November 7, 1876, as part of the 1876 United States presidential election. Florida voters chose four representatives, or electors, to the Electoral College, who voted for president and vice president.

Florida was won by Rutherford B. Hayes, the governor of Ohio (R-Ohio), running with Representative William A. Wheeler, with 50.99% of the vote, against Samuel J. Tilden, the former governor of New York (D–New York), running with Thomas A. Hendricks, the governor of Indiana and future vice president, with 49.01% of the popular vote.

Florida, along with South Carolina and Louisiana, was one of the states allegedly affected by the Compromise of 1877. Had Tilden won the state, he would have won the election.

This would be the final time a Republican presidential candidate would carry Florida until Herbert Hoover won the state in 1928.

== Results ==
1876 United States presidential election in Florida
Party	Candidate	Running mate	Popular vote		Electoral vote	
Party	Candidate	Running mate	Count	%	Count	%
Republican	Rutherford B. Hayes of Ohio	William A. Wheeler of New York	23,849	50.99%	4	100.00%
Democratic	Samuel J. Tilden of New York	Thomas A. Hendricks of Indiana	22,927	49.01%	0	0.00%
Total			46,776	100.00%	4	100.00%

== See also ==
- United States presidential elections in Florida
- 1876 United States House of Representatives elections in Florida
- 1876 Florida gubernatorial election
