= 1872 State of the Union Address =

Speech by US President Ulysses S. Grant

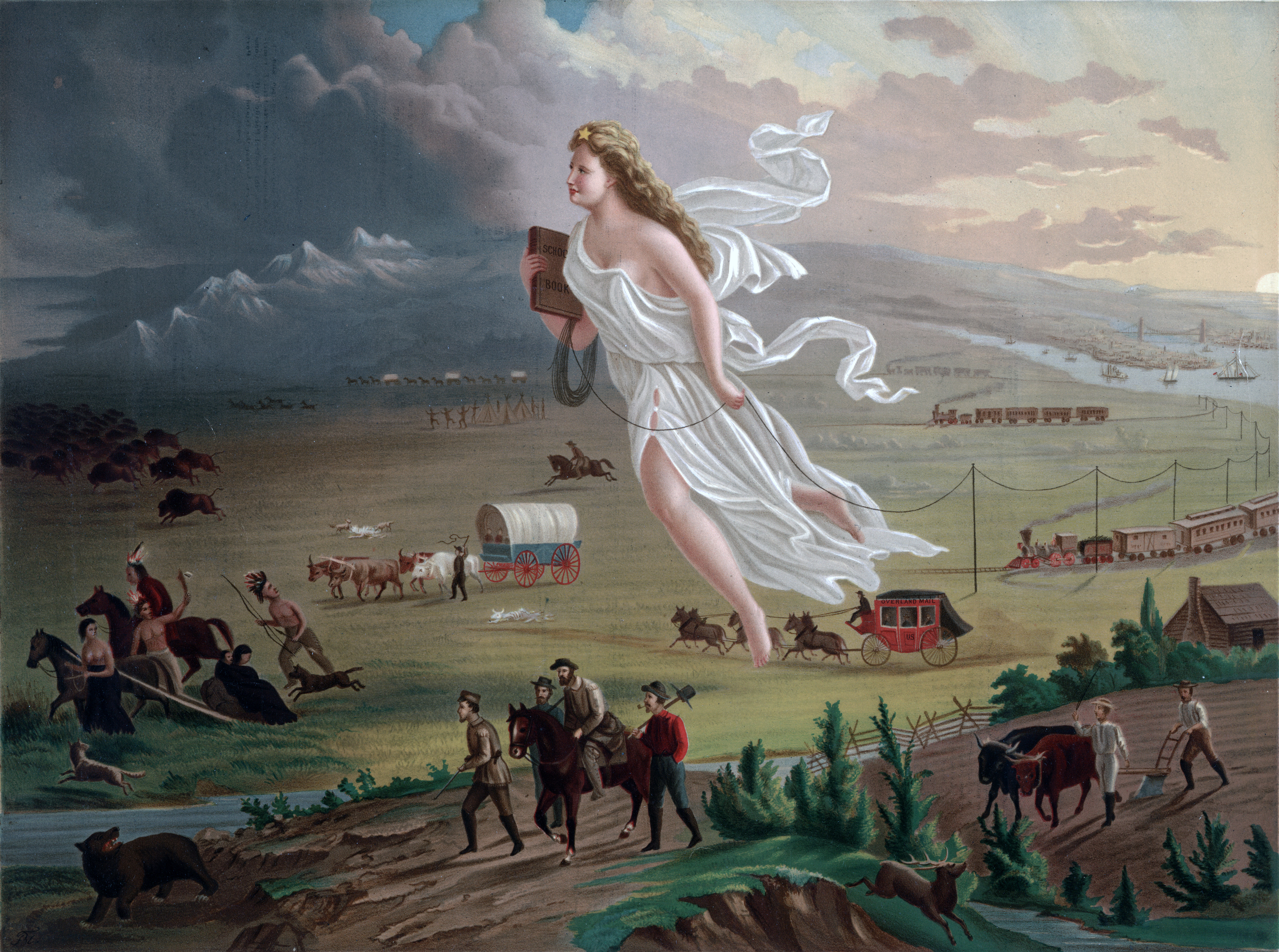
- This famous painting by John Gast in 1872 shows Manifest Destiny, the belief in westward expansion of the United States from the Atlantic to the Pacific Ocean. It was widely distributed as an engraving called "Spirit of the Frontier". Settlers are moving west, guided and protected by Columbia, aided by modern technology like railroads, and driving Native Americans and bison into obscurity. Columbia represents America, dressed in a Roman toga to represent classical republicanism, and brings the enlightened east to the darkened west
- Date: December 2, 1872
- Venue: House Chamber, United States Capitol
- Location: Washington, D.C.; 38°53′23″N 77°00′32″W
- Type: State of the Union Address
- Participants: Ulysses S. Grant; Schuyler Colfax; James G. Blaine
- Format: Written
- Previous: 1871 State of the Union Address
- Next: 1873 State of the Union Address

The 1872 State of the Union Address was given by Ulysses S. Grant, the 18th United States president, on December 2, 1872. He did not speak it to the 42nd United States Congress, because that was the custom at the time. He said, "In transmitting to you this my fourth annual message it is with thankfulness to the Giver of All Good that as a nation we have been blessed for the past year with peace at home, peace abroad, and a general prosperity vouchsafed to but few peoples." It was given during the Reconstruction Era, when African Americans were freed.

Notably, the President's address contained mention of the 1873 Vienna International Exposition and that money was being allocated to American exhibitors participating in the exposition. In foreign policy matters, the President mentioned disapproval towards the slow progress in abolition of slavery in Cuba.

Preceded by 1871 State of the Union Address	State of the Union addresses 1872	Succeeded by 1873 State of the Union Address
