= 1871 State of the Union Address =

Speech by US President Ulysses S. Grant

- Date: December 4, 1871
- Venue: House Chamber, United States Capitol
- Location: Washington, D.C.; 38°53′23″N 77°00′32″W
- Type: State of the Union Address
- Participants: Ulysses S. Grant; Schuyler Colfax; James G. Blaine
- Format: Written
- Previous: 1870 State of the Union Address
- Next: 1872 State of the Union Address

The 1871 State of the Union address was delivered by the 18th president of the United States Ulysses S. Grant to the 42nd United States Congress on December 4, 1871. President Grant highlighted the nation's prosperity and emphasized the enforcement of federal laws. He commended the peaceful resolution of disputes with the United Kingdom through the Treaty of Washington and noted progress in relations with Germany, Italy, and other nations.

Grant addressed challenges in domestic policy, particularly the suppression of Ku Klux Klan violence in South Carolina under the Ku Klux Act, justifying his suspension of habeas corpus and the arrest of hundreds of individuals involved in unlawful conspiracies. He also reported a reduction of the national debt by $86 million and proposed tax reforms, including lower tariffs and the elimination of most internal taxes except those on alcohol and tobacco.

Grant reiterated his support for the Indian Peace Policy and proposed territorial government for Native American lands to safeguard treaty rights. He called for improvements in civil service, infrastructure, and the postal system, urging federal support for telegraphic expansion and the rebuilding of government facilities destroyed in the Great Chicago Fire.

Grant concluded by advocating for reconciliation in the post-Civil War South, including removing political disabilities under the Fourteenth Amendment, and stressed the importance of education and economic stability for national progress.

Preceded by 1870 State of the Union Address	State of the Union addresses 1871	Succeeded by 1872 State of the Union Address
