= 1869 State of the Union Address =

Speech by US President Ulysses S. Grant

- The ceremony for the driving of the golden spike at Promontory Summit, Utah on May 10, 1869; completion of the First Transcontinental Railroad. At center left, Samuel S. Montague, Central Pacific Railroad, shakes hands with Grenville M. Dodge, Union Pacific Railroad (center right).
- Date: December 6, 1869
- Venue: House Chamber, United States Capitol
- Location: Washington, D.C.; 38°53′23″N 77°00′32″W
- Type: State of the Union Address
- Participants: Ulysses S. Grant; Schuyler Colfax; James G. Blaine
- Format: Written
- Previous: 1868 State of the Union Address
- Next: 1870 State of the Union Address

The 1869 State of the Union address was delivered by the 18th president of the United States Ulysses S. Grant on December 6, 1869, to the 41st United States Congress. It was Grant's first annual address, focusing on post-Civil War recovery, economic policy, and civil rights.

== Content ==
=== Restoration ===
Grant highlighted the nation's prosperity, stating, "We are blessed with peace at home, and are without entangling alliances abroad." He described the nation's potential with "a territory unsurpassed in fertility" and "a population of 40,000,000 free people." He celebrated Reconstruction successes, noting that seven states had been restored to the Union and urging Congress to address violations in Georgia, where African American legislators had been unseated.

=== Economic policy ===
On economic policy, Grant advocated a gradual return to specie payments to stabilize the currency, arguing that "it is a duty...to secure to the citizen a medium of exchange of fixed, unvarying value." He also proposed replacing high-interest bonds with lower-interest ones to reduce public debt burdens.

=== Foreign policy ===
Grant addressed foreign policy, maintaining neutrality in Cuba's fight for independence while expressing "warm feelings and sympathies for the people of Cuba." He also endorsed the construction of an interoceanic canal through Central America, which he believed would benefit global commerce.

=== Domestic policy ===
On domestic policy, Grant proposed reforms in Native American relations, emphasizing peace through reservations and eventual self-governance: "I have attempted a new policy toward these wards of the nation...which I hope will be attended ultimately with great success." He also called for "protection to the person and property of the citizen...without reference to original nationality, religion, color, or politics."

=== Conclusion ===
Grant concluded by urging Congress to repeal the Tenure of Office Act, which he argued hindered efficient governance, and by reaffirming his commitment to the nation’s unity and progress.

Preceded by 1868 State of the Union Address	State of the Union addresses 1869	Succeeded by 1870 State of the Union Address
