= 1873 State of the Union Address =

Speech by US President Ulysses S. Grant

- Date: December 1, 1873
- Venue: House Chamber, United States Capitol
- Location: Washington, D.C.; 38°53′23″N 77°00′32″W
- Type: State of the Union Address
- Participants: Ulysses S. Grant; Henry Wilson; James G. Blaine
- Format: Written
- Previous: 1872 State of the Union Address
- Next: 1874 State of the Union Address

The 1873 State of the Union address was delivered by the 18th president of the United States, Ulysses S. Grant, to the 43rd United States Congress on December 1, 1873. In his message, Grant addressed issues related to domestic prosperity, financial instability, foreign relations, and internal governance.

== Content ==
=== Financial issues ===
One of the key themes of the address was the financial panic that began in September 1873, which Grant described as a significant economic crisis. He called for measures to increase the elasticity of the monetary system and to move the nation toward a specie payment system, stating, "We can never have permanent prosperity until a specie basis is reached."

=== Diplomatic and foreign affairs ===
Grant also highlighted the progress of American participation in the Vienna Exposition and praised the recognition received by American exhibitors. Additionally, he reported on the nation's diplomatic relationships, noting generally cordial relations with most foreign powers but emphasizing the capture of the Virginius by Spain, which had escalated tensions. He stated that "the restoration of the Virginius and the surrender of the survivors" had been negotiated, reflecting diplomatic progress.

=== Civil rights and reconstruction ===
On civil rights and reconstruction, Grant urged Congress to pass a general amnesty for former Confederates and to enact legislation to protect the civil rights of newly enfranchised African Americans. He described the need for "laws to better secure the civil rights which freedom should secure, but has not effectually secured."

=== Domestic issues ===
Grant addressed the continuing need for civil-service reform, advocating for standardized rules to ensure merit-based appointments and to shield public servants from political pressures. He also called for improvements in judicial processes in the Utah Territory, where legal issues had paralyzed governance.

On domestic policy, Grant recommended legislative attention to education, postal reform, and infrastructure, including irrigation projects in arid western lands. He reiterated his commitment to fostering peaceful relations with Native American tribes while promoting their integration into a more settled way of life.

=== Conclusion ===
Grant's message concluded with a call for national unity and the strengthening of institutions to meet the challenges of the time, emphasizing the importance of prudent financial management and the protection of civil liberties.

| Preceded by 1872 State of the Union Address | State of the Union addresses 1873 | Succeeded by 1874 State of the Union Address |
