= 1875 State of the Union Address =

Speech by US President Ulysses S. Grant

- Date: December 7, 1875
- Venue: House Chamber, United States Capitol
- Location: Washington, D.C.; 38°53′23″N 77°00′32″W
- Type: State of the Union Address
- Participants: Ulysses S. Grant; Thomas W. Ferry; Michael C. Kerr
- Format: Written
- Previous: 1874 State of the Union Address
- Next: 1876 State of the Union Address

The 1875 State of the Union Address was given by Ulysses S. Grant, the 18th president of the United States on Tuesday, December 7, 1875. It was written by him, but not presented to the 44th United States Congress by him. He said, "In submitting my seventh annual message to Congress, in this centennial year of our national existence as a free and independent people, it affords me great pleasure to recur to the advancement that has been made from the time of the colonies, one hundred years ago. We were then a people numbering only 3,000,000. Now we number more than 40,000,000. Then industries were confined almost exclusively to the tillage of the soil. Now manufactories absorb much of the labor of the country." The Industrial Revolution had begun.

In foreign policy matters, the President's address mentions a new treaty with the Kingdom of Hawaii, and the insurrection of locals in Cuba against Spanish rule. The President also commented on the rapidly growing importance of electric telegraphy and that the United States Direct Cable Company recently completed a line connecting the US and Great Britain.

In domestic matters, the President's address mentions the discovery of gold in the Black Hills of the Sioux Reservation and the increased amount of emigration because of this. The President closed the address with what he viewed as being the five most important legislative matters at hand:

First. That the States shall be required to afford the opportunity of a good common-school education to every child within their limits.

Second. No sectarian tenets shall ever be taught in any school supported in whole or in part by the State, nation, or by the proceeds of any tax levied upon any community. Make education compulsory so far as to deprive all persons who can not read and write from becoming voters after the year 1890, disfranchising none, however, on grounds of illiteracy who may be voters at the time this amendment takes effect.

Third. Declare church and state forever separate and distinct, but each free within their proper spheres; and that all church property shall bear its own proportion of taxation.

Fourth. Drive out licensed immorality, such as polygamy and the importation of women for illegitimate purposes. To recur again to the centennial year, it would seem as though now, as we are about to begin the second century of our national existence, would be a most fitting time for these reforms.

Fifth. Enact such laws as will insure a speedy return to a sound currency, such as will command the respect of the world.

Believing that these views will commend themselves to the great majority of the right-thinking and patriotic citizens of the United States, I submit the rest to Congress.

Preceded by 1874 State of the Union Address	State of the Union addresses 1875	Succeeded by 1876 State of the Union Address
