= 1870 State of the Union Address =

Speech by US President Ulysses S. Grant

- Date: December 5, 1870
- Venue: House Chamber, United States Capitol
- Location: Washington, D.C.; 38°53′23″N 77°00′32″W
- Type: State of the Union Address
- Participants: Ulysses S. Grant; Schuyler Colfax; James G. Blaine
- Format: Written
- Previous: 1869 State of the Union Address
- Next: 1871 State of the Union Address

The 1870 State of the Union address was delivered by the 18th president of the United States Ulysses S. Grant on December 5, 1870, to the 41st United States Congress. This was Grant's second annual message, emphasizing Reconstruction, foreign relations, and domestic reforms.

== Themes ==
Grant noted the progress of Reconstruction, stating, "The States of Virginia, Mississippi, and Texas have been restored to representation in our national councils." He expressed hope that Georgia would soon rejoin, completing the process. However, he condemned instances of voter suppression, saying, "A free exercise of the elective franchise has by violence and intimidation been denied to citizens in several of the States lately in rebellion."

The president also reaffirmed the nation's commitment to honoring the public debt and pensions for disabled soldiers, stating, "There is no reason why we should not advance in material prosperity and happiness as no other nation ever did after so protracted and devastating a war."

In foreign affairs, Grant emphasized the importance of neutrality during the Franco-Prussian War and discussed U.S. diplomatic efforts. "Should the time come when the action of the United States can hasten the return of peace by a single hour," he assured, "that action will be heartily taken." He also addressed ongoing issues with Spain, particularly the treatment of U.S. citizens in Cuba, and promoted arbitration as a solution for resolving disputes.

On the annexation of Santo Domingo, Grant urged Congress to act, arguing the territory would benefit the nation economically and strategically. "The acquisition of San Domingo is desirable because of its geographical position," he stated, adding that it would strengthen U.S. influence in the Caribbean and promote freedom by making slavery in neighboring regions "insupportable."

Domestically, Grant highlighted advancements in Indian policy, describing his decision to entrust agencies to religious organizations to promote peace and assimilation. "The policy now pursued will in a few years bring all the Indians upon reservations...where they will live in houses, and have schoolhouses and churches," he explained. He also proposed civil service reforms, criticizing the patronage system. "The present system does not secure the best men, and often not even fit men, for public place," he remarked, calling for a merit-based approach to appointments.

On economic matters, Grant pointed to a reduction in taxes and a closer approach to a specie-based currency. He warned of the dangers of instability in the currency, advocating prudent steps to bring it to par with gold. He also recommended continuing efforts to reduce the national debt while maintaining government obligations, emphasizing, "Revenue reform, if it means this, has my hearty support."

Grant concluded with a call for national unity and progress, emphasizing the need for "a pure, untrammeled ballot" and equal protection under the law. He pledged a continued focus on enforcing laws, reducing debt, and ensuring fairness in governance.

Preceded by 1869 State of the Union Address	State of the Union addresses 1870	Succeeded by 1871 State of the Union Address
