= 1874 State of the Union Address =

Speech by US President Ulysses S. Grant

- Date: December 7, 1874
- Venue: House Chamber, United States Capitol
- Location: Washington, D.C.; 38°53′23″N 77°00′32″W
- Type: State of the Union Address
- Participants: Ulysses S. Grant; Henry Wilson; James G. Blaine
- Format: Written
- Previous: 1873 State of the Union Address
- Next: 1875 State of the Union Address

The 1874 State of the Union address was delivered by the 18th president of the United States, Ulysses S. Grant, to the 43rd United States Congress on December 7, 1874. In his message, Grant addressed economic challenges, foreign relations, and domestic governance in the wake of the Panic of 1873 and ongoing political turbulence in the Reconstruction-era South.

Grant acknowledged the economic hardships caused by the financial crisis, noting the high unemployment and underutilization of both labor and capital. He emphasized the importance of returning to a stable, specie-backed currency, stating, "There can be no prosperous and permanent revival of business and industries until a policy is adopted... looking to a return to a specie basis." He recommended repealing the legal-tender clause for new contracts and adopting measures to accumulate gold reserves to support redemption.

In foreign affairs, Grant highlighted the peaceful relations between the United States and most nations. He discussed the termination of a trade treaty with Belgium, the resolution of disputes under the Treaty of Washington, and continued efforts to negotiate with Spain regarding the ongoing Ten Years' War in Cuba. He also expressed concerns about the abuse of Chinese immigrant labor contracts and called for measures to address the exploitation of Chinese women brought to the United States for "shameful purposes."

Regarding Reconstruction and the Southern states, Grant reported on unrest in Louisiana and Arkansas, where disputed elections and political violence had created instability. He reiterated the federal government's commitment to enforcing the Fifteenth Amendment and protecting African Americans' right to vote, despite opposition. "The whole scheme of colored enfranchisement is worse than mockery if these rights are not enforced," he stated.

Grant also recommended the creation of a court to handle claims from foreign citizens related to Civil War-era damages, reforms to naturalization laws to prevent fraud, and legislation to address citizenship questions for children born abroad to American parents and for American women who married foreign nationals.

In domestic policy, Grant encouraged Congress to support infrastructure projects, including irrigation systems in the arid West, improvements to the Mississippi River, and a revival of American shipbuilding. He proposed incentives for American steamship lines carrying mail to strengthen the nation's commercial presence abroad. Grant further emphasized the importance of education and supported extending homestead laws to Native Americans alongside measures to establish a territorial government in the Indian Territory.

On civil service reform, Grant warned that without explicit support from Congress, he would abandon competitive examinations and the associated rules, stating, "If Congress adjourns without positive legislation on the subject of 'civil-service reform,' I will regard such action as a disapproval of the system."

The address concluded with a call for unity and constructive action to address the nation's challenges, with Grant urging fairness in discussions of Southern issues and commitment to enforcing the laws of the land.

Preceded by 1873 State of the Union Address	State of the Union addresses 1874	Succeeded by 1875 State of the Union Address
