= 1935 State of the Union Address =

Speech by US President Franklin D. Roosevelt

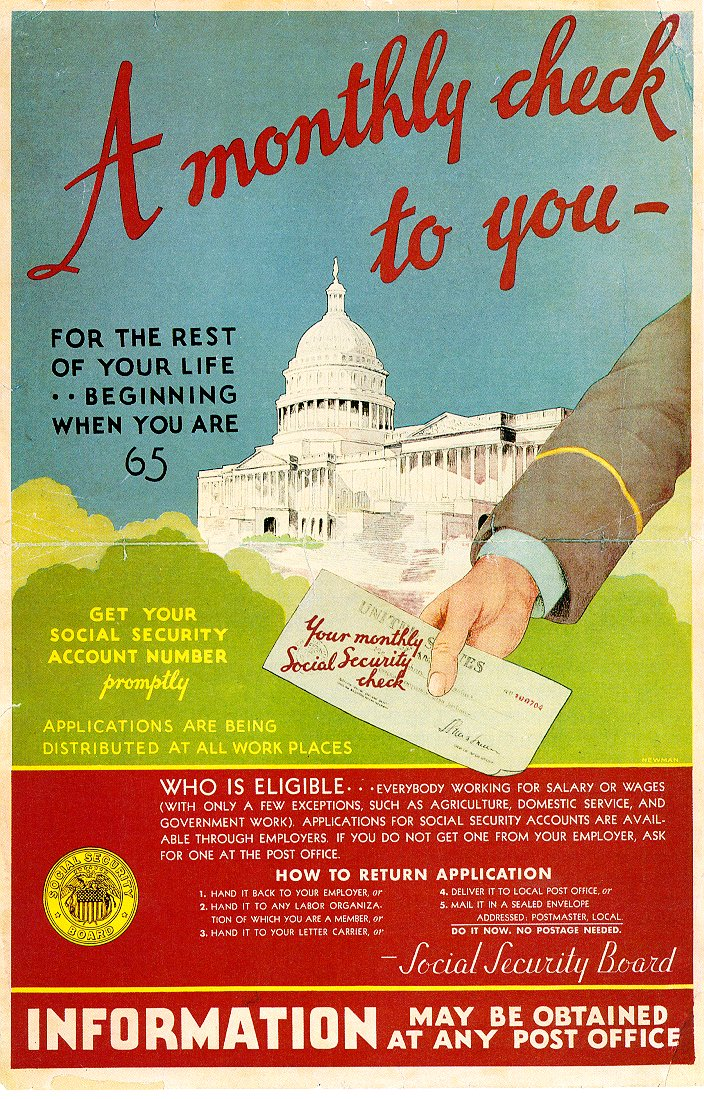
- United States Government poster informing citizens of the Social Security program
- Date: January 4, 1935
- Venue: House Chamber, United States Capitol
- Location: Washington, D.C.; 38°53′23″N 77°00′32″W
- Type: State of the Union Address
- Participants: Franklin D. Roosevelt; John Nance Garner; Jo Byrns
- Previous: 1934 State of the Union Address
- Next: 1936 State of the Union Address

The 1935 State of the Union address was given by the 32nd president of the United States Franklin Delano Roosevelt to the 74th United States Congress. Presiding over this joint session was the House speaker, Jo Byrns, accompanied by John Nance Garner, the vice president, in his capacity as the president of the Senate. It was in the 1935 speech were Roosevelt used the phrase "State of the Union", which began the common use of the term to describe the annual address.

A major focus was the creation of a social safety net, with Roosevelt emphasizing the need for unemployment insurance and old-age pensions, laying the foundation for the Social Security Act of 1935. "Among our objectives, I place the security of the men, women, and children of the Nation first," Roosevelt said, highlighting the importance of these reforms.

He also stressed the need for meaningful employment, rejecting reliance on mere relief payments: "Work must be found for able-bodied but destitute workers." Roosevelt proposed expanding public works to provide long-term, sustainable employment.

The speech marked a pivotal moment in American policy, setting the stage for significant legislative changes that would reshape the nation's welfare and labor systems.

| Preceded by 1934 State of the Union Address | State of the Union addresses 1935 | Succeeded by 1936 State of the Union Address |
