= 1934 State of the Union Address =

Speech by US President Franklin D. Roosevelt

- Date: January 3, 1934
- Venue: House Chamber, United States Capitol
- Location: Washington, D.C.; 38°53′23″N 77°00′32″W
- Type: State of the Union Address
- Participants: Franklin D. Roosevelt; John Nance Garner; Jo Byrns
- Previous: 1932 State of the Union Address
- Next: 1935 State of the Union Address

The 1934 State of the Union Address was given on Wednesday, January 3, 1934, by the 32nd president of the United States, Franklin D. Roosevelt. It was the first State of the Union address to be given in January since George Washington's first State of the Union Address in 1790.

== Themes ==
The President discussed the improvement of the unemployment rate in the country and the effectiveness of the National Industrial Recovery Act towards restarting the economy. Additionally, the President mentioned the Agriculture Adjustment Act towards stabilizing farm prices.

== Quotations ==
Now that we are definitely in the process of recovery, lines have been rightly drawn between those to whom this recovery means a return to old methods—and the number of these people is small—and those for whom recovery means a reform of many old methods, a permanent readjustment of many of our ways of thinking and therefore of many of our social and economic arrangements...

— President Franklin D. Roosevelt, 1934 State of the Union address

Civilization cannot go back; civilization must not stand still. We have undertaken new methods. It is our task to perfect, to improve, to alter when necessary, but in all cases to go forward. To consolidate what we are doing, to make our economic and social structure capable of dealing with modern life is the joint task of the legislative, the judicial, and the executive branches of the national Government.

— President Franklin D. Roosevelt, 1934 State of the Union address

== See also ==
- United States House of Representatives elections, 1934

Preceded by 1932 State of the Union Address	State of the Union addresses 1934	Succeeded by 1935 State of the Union Address
