= 1938 State of the Union Address =

Speech by US President Franklin D. Roosevelt

- Date: January 3, 1938
- Venue: House Chamber, United States Capitol
- Location: Washington, D.C.; 38°53′23″N 77°00′32″W
- Type: State of the Union Address
- Participants: Franklin D. Roosevelt; John Nance Garner; William B. Bankhead
- Previous: 1937 State of the Union Address
- Next: 1939 State of the Union Address

The 1938 State of the Union Address was given on Monday, January 3, 1938, by the 32nd United States president, Franklin D. Roosevelt. He stated,

== Statements ==
- In spite of the determination of this Nation for peace, it has become clear that acts and policies of nations in other parts of the world have far-reaching effects not only upon their immediate neighbors but also on us.
- But in a world of high tension and disorder, in a world where stable civilization is actually threatened, it becomes the responsibility of each nation which strives for peace at home and peace with and among others to be strong enough to assure the observance of those fundamentals of peaceful solution of conflicts which are the only ultimate basis for orderly existence.

== See also ==
- United States House of Representatives elections, 1938

Preceded by 1937 State of the Union Address	State of the Union addresses 1938	Succeeded by 1939 State of the Union Address
