= 1936 State of the Union Address =

Speech by US President Franklin D. Roosevelt

- Date: January 3, 1936
- Time: Evening
- Duration: 50 minutes
- Venue: House Chamber, United States Capitol
- Location: Washington, D.C.; 38°53′23″N 77°00′32″W
- Type: State of the Union Address
- Participants: Franklin D. Roosevelt; John Nance Garner; Jo Byrns
- Previous: 1935 State of the Union Address
- Next: 1937 State of the Union Address

The 1936 State of the Union address was given by President Franklin D. Roosevelt to a joint session of the 74th United States Congress on Friday, January 3, 1936, in the midst of the Great Depression. Presiding over this joint session was the House speaker, Jo Byrns, accompanied by John Nance Garner, the vice president, in his capacity as the president of the Senate.

This was the first State of the Union Address to be held in the evening. Roosevelt made a last-minute decision to move the speech to the evening in order to reach the largest possible radio audience. In the speech, Roosevelt discussed what he felt were the accomplishments of his administration and the New Deal up to that point. House Speaker Jo Byrns remarked that the speech "very clearly sets forth the major issues of the coming campaign."

In the closing paragraph of his address, Roosevelt quoted an individual whom he referred to as a "wise philosopher." That individual was Josiah Royce in his 1914 work "A Word for the Times," which Roosevelt quoted by saying

"What great crises teach all men whom the example and counsel of the brave inspire is the lesson: Fear not, view all the tasks of life as sacred, have faith in the triumph of the ideal, give daily all that you have to give, be loyal and rejoice whenever you find yourselves part of a great ideal enterprise. You, at this moment, have the honor to belong to a generation whose lips are touched by fire. You live in a land that now enjoys the blessings of peace. But let nothing human be wholly alien to you. The human race now passes through one of its great crises. New ideas, new issues—a new call for men to carry on the work of righteousness, of charity, of courage, of patience, and of loyalty. . . . However memory bring back this moment to your minds, let it be able to say to you: That was a great moment. It was the beginning of a new era. . . . This world in its crisis called for volunteers, for men of faith in life, of patience in service, of charity and of insight. I responded to the call however I could. I volunteered to give myself to my Master—the cause of humane and brave living. I studied, I loved, I labored, unsparingly and hopefully, to be worthy of my generation."

In response to Roosevelt's address, House Minority Leader Bertrand Snell, a Republican from New York, was quoted as saying the speech was "a political speech... and a political hippodrome."

Preceded by 1935 State of the Union Address	State of the Union addresses 1936	Succeeded by 1937 State of the Union Address
