= 1937 State of the Union Address =

Speech by US President Franklin D. Roosevelt

- Date: January 6, 1937
- Venue: House Chamber, United States Capitol
- Location: Washington, D.C.
- Type: State of the Union Address
- Participants: Franklin D. Roosevelt; John Nance Garner; William B. Bankhead
- Previous: 1936 State of the Union Address
- Next: 1938 State of the Union Address

The 1937 State of the Union Address was delivered by President Franklin D. Roosevelt on January 6, 1937, marking his fourth address to Congress. The speech was delivered shortly after Roosevelt's reelection and was the first time in U.S. history that a president addressed a newly elected Congress at the end of a term, rather than at the beginning.

In his address, Roosevelt emphasized the need for continued reforms to solidify the gains of the New Deal. He called for further expansion of social welfare programs and argued against retreating from the economic progress that had been achieved since 1933.

Roosevelt also introduced his controversial plan to reorganize the judicial system, which later became known as the court-packing plan. He signaled the need to modernize the executive branch and improve the efficiency of the government's administrative functions.

Additionally, Roosevelt addressed international concerns, particularly the Spanish Civil War, and advocated for an amendment to the Neutrality Acts to account for the conflict in Spain. His foreign policy approach reflected growing tensions in Europe and the need for U.S. readiness.

Preceded by 1936 State of the Union Address	State of the Union addresses 1937	Succeeded by 1938 State of the Union Address
