= 1939 State of the Union Address =

Speech by US President Franklin D. Roosevelt

- Date: January 4, 1939
- Venue: House Chamber, United States Capitol
- Location: Washington, D.C.; 38°53′23″N 77°00′32″W
- Type: State of the Union Address
- Participants: Franklin D. Roosevelt; John Nance Garner; William B. Bankhead
- Previous: 1938 State of the Union Address
- Next: 1940 State of the Union Address

The 1939 State of the Union Address was given to the 76th United States Congress, on Wednesday, January 4, 1939, by Franklin D. Roosevelt, the 32nd United States president. Foreseeing World War II, he said, "In Reporting on the state of the nation, I have felt it necessary on previous occasions to advise the Congress of disturbance abroad and of the need of putting our own house in order in the face of storm signals from across the seas. As this 76th Congress opens there is need for further warning. A war which threatened to envelop the world in flames has been averted; but it has become increasingly clear that world peace is not assured." On September 1, 1939, the War in Europe began.

Roosevelt ended his speech by quoting the closing lines from Abraham Lincoln's 1862 State of the Union Address when he said the following:

Once I prophesied that this generation of Americans had a rendezvous with destiny. That prophecy comes true. To us much is given; more is expected. (Note: This is an allusion to Luke 12:48.) This generation will "nobly save or meanly lose the last best hope of earth. . . . The way is plain, peaceful, generous, just—a way which if followed the world will forever applaud and God must forever bless."

Preceded by 1938 State of the Union Address	State of the Union addresses 1939	Succeeded by 1940 State of the Union Address
