= Franklin D. Roosevelt =

President of the United States from 1933 to 1945

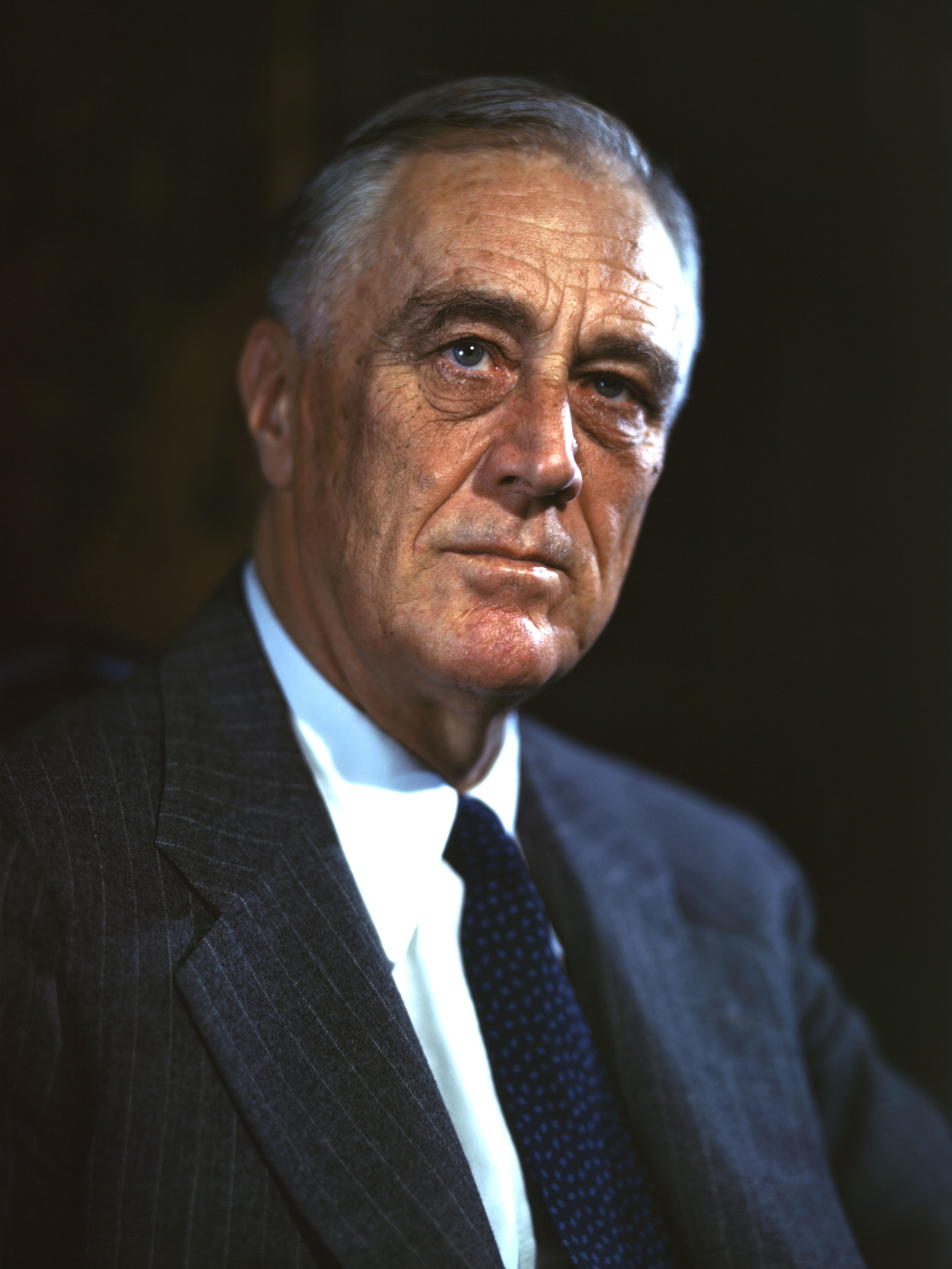
- Campaign portrait, 1944

32nd President of the United States
- In office March 4, 1933 – April 12, 1945
- Vice President: John Nance Garner (1933–1941); Henry A. Wallace (1941–1945); Harry S. Truman (Jan–Apr 1945)
- Preceded by: Herbert Hoover
- Succeeded by: Harry S. Truman

44th Governor of New York
- In office January 1, 1929 – 1932
- Lieutenant: Herbert H. Lehman
- Preceded by: Al Smith
- Succeeded by: Herbert H. Lehman

Assistant Secretary of the Navy
- In office 1913–1920
- President: Woodrow Wilson
- Preceded by: Beekman Winthrop
- Succeeded by: Gordon Woodbury

Member of the New York State Senate from the 26th district
- In office 1911–1913
- Preceded by: John F. Schlosser
- Succeeded by: James E. Towner

Personal details
- Born: January 30, 1882 Hyde Park, New York, US
- Died: April 12, 1945 (aged 63) Warm Springs, Georgia, US
- Resting place: Springwood Estate, Hyde Park
- Party: Democratic
- Spouse: Eleanor Roosevelt (m. 1905)
- Children: 6
- Relatives: Roosevelt family; Delano family
- Education: Harvard University (AB)
- Roosevelt's voice On the attack on Pearl Harbor and declaring war on Japan

Franklin Delano Roosevelt (Note: Pronounced /ˈdɛlənoʊ ˈroʊzəvɛlt, -vəlt/ DEL-ə-noh ROH-zə-velt, -vəlt.) (January 30, 1882 – April 12, 1945), also known as FDR, was the 32nd president of the United States, serving from 1933 until his death in 1945. He is the longest-serving US president and the only one to have served more than two terms. His first two terms centered on combating the Great Depression, while his third and fourth focused on US involvement in World War II. A member of the Democratic Party, Roosevelt served in the New York State Senate from 1911 to 1913 and as the 44th governor of New York from 1929 to 1932.

Born into the prominent Delano and Roosevelt families, Roosevelt graduated from Harvard University. He was elected to the New York State Senate in 1910, before becoming the assistant secretary of the Navy under President Woodrow Wilson in 1913. Roosevelt was the running mate of James M. Cox on the Democratic ticket in the 1920 presidential election, which Cox lost to Republican nominee Warren G. Harding. In 1921, an illness permanently paralyzed his legs. However, partly through the encouragement of his wife Eleanor, he was elected governor of New York in 1928. As governor, he promoted programs to combat the Great Depression.

Roosevelt defeated President Herbert Hoover in a landslide victory in the 1932 presidential election. During his first 100 days as president, Roosevelt initiated the program to implement the New Deal, built the New Deal coalition, and realigned American politics into the Fifth Party System. He created programs to provide relief to the unemployed and farmers while seeking economic recovery with the National Recovery Administration and other programs. He was re-elected in 1936, in one of the largest landslide victories in American history. Major surviving programs and legislation implemented under Roosevelt include the Securities and Exchange Commission, the National Labor Relations Act, and Social Security. In 1940, he was reelected, as there were no presidential term limits until 1951.

Following the Japanese attack on Pearl Harbor on December 7, 1941, Roosevelt obtained a declaration of war on Japan, and subsequently on Nazi Germany and Fascist Italy. Roosevelt supervised the mobilization of the American economy to support the war effort and implemented a Europe first strategy. He also initiated the development of the first atomic bomb and worked with the other Allied leaders to lay the groundwork for the United Nations. Roosevelt won reelection in 1944, but died in 1945. Since then, some of his actions have been criticized, such as his ordering of the internment of Japanese Americans. Nonetheless, historical rankings consistently place him among the three greatest American presidents.

== Early life and education ==
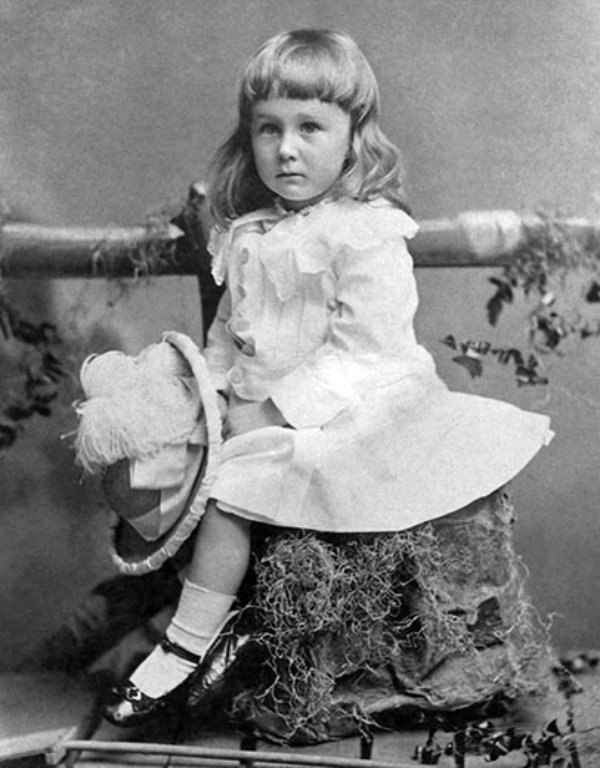
A young, unbreeched Roosevelt in 1884, aged 2

Franklin Delano Roosevelt was born on January 30, 1882, in Hyde Park, New York, to James Roosevelt I and his second wife, Sara Ann Delano. His parents, who were sixth cousins, came from the wealthy Roosevelt and Delano families. They resided at Springwood, a large estate south of Hyde Park's historic center. James, "a wealthy, landed gentleman who dabbled in but usually devoted no great effort to business", was a prominent Bourbon Democrat. His mother Sara "devoted virtually all her energies to raising her only child". Franklin had a half-brother, James Roosevelt "Rosy" Roosevelt, from his father's previous marriage.

According to Alan Brinkley, the family lived "in a manner reminiscent of the English aristocracy, and Franklin grew up, therefore, in a remarkably cosseted environment, insulated from the normal experiences of most American boys". Frequent trips to Europe and Canada helped Roosevelt become conversant in German and French. Aside from a stint in public school in Germany at age nine, Roosevelt was homeschooled by tutors until age 14. He then attended Groton School, an exclusive Episcopal boarding school in Groton, Massachusetts. He was not among the more popular Groton students, who were better athletes. Its headmaster, Endicott Peabody, preached the duties of Christians and urged his students to enter public service. Peabody remained a strong influence throughout Roosevelt's life, officiating at his wedding and presiding over the church service which preceded his inauguration as president.

Like most of his Groton classmates, Roosevelt went to Harvard College. He was a member of the Alpha Delta Phi fraternity "Fly Club", though he regretted not being admitted to the Porcellian Club. Roosevelt was relatively undistinguished as a student or athlete, but he became editor-in-chief of The Harvard Crimson newspaper. Roosevelt's father died in 1900. The following year, Roosevelt's cousin Theodore Roosevelt became US president. Theodore's vigorous leadership style and reforming zeal made him Franklin's role model. Franklin graduated from Harvard in three years in 1903 with an A.B. in history. He took graduate courses for an additional year to continue his work with the Crimson. Roosevelt entered Columbia Law School in 1904, but dropped out in 1907 after passing the bar.

== Marriage and family ==
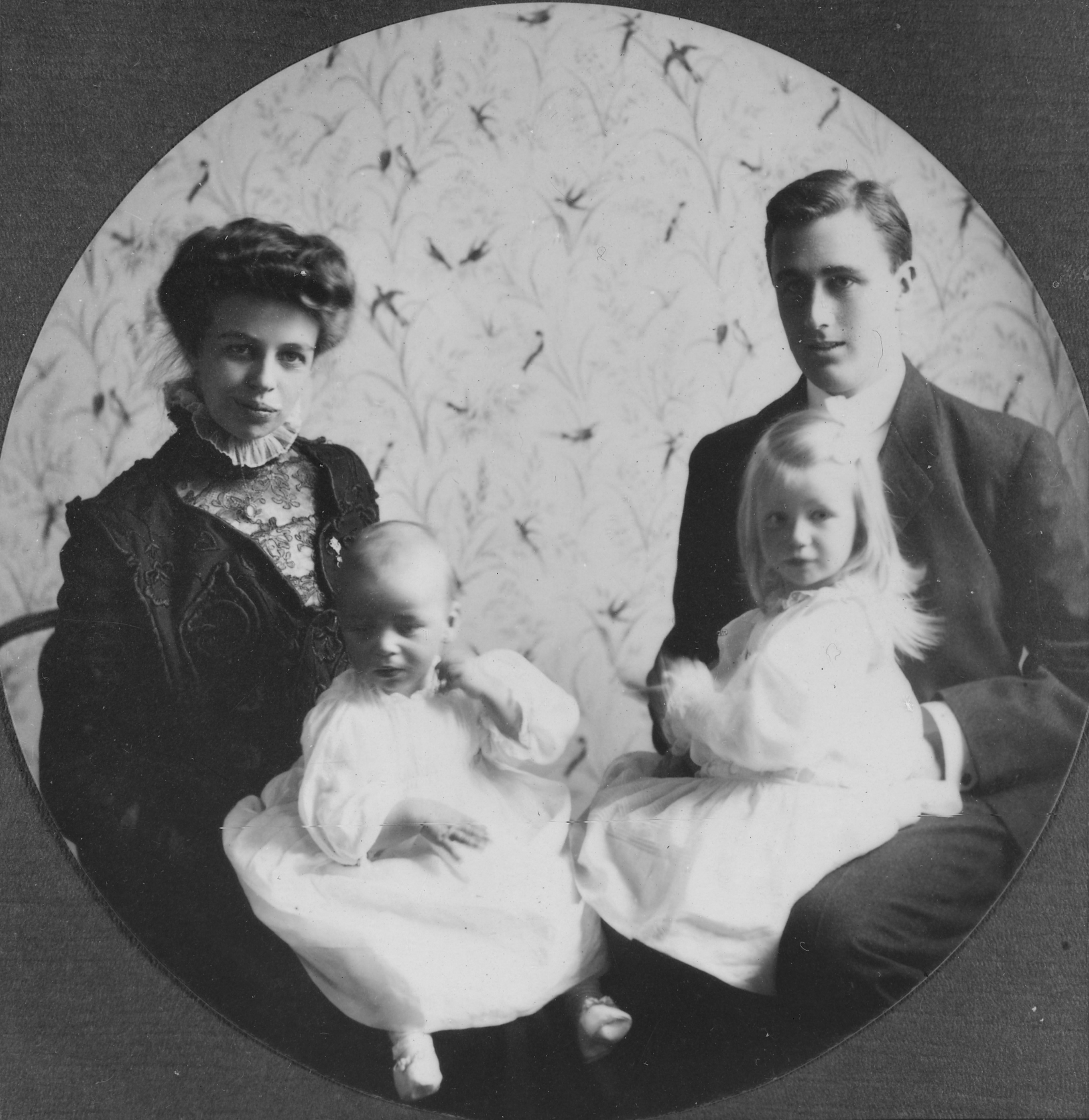
Eleanor and Franklin with their first two children, 1908

While at college, Roosevelt met and proposed to the heiress Alice Sohier, who declined. Franklin then began courting his childhood acquaintance and fifth cousin once removed, Eleanor Roosevelt, a niece of Theodore Roosevelt. In 1903, Franklin proposed to Eleanor. Despite "initial resistance" from his mother, Franklin and Eleanor Roosevelt were married on March 17, 1905. Theodore, who was then President, gave away the bride since Eleanor's father Elliott was deceased. The young couple moved into Springwood. Franklin's mother, Sara Roosevelt, also provided a townhouse for the newlyweds in New York City, and had a house built for herself alongside that townhouse. Eleanor never felt at home in the houses at Hyde Park or New York City. However, she loved the family's vacation home on Campobello Island, also a gift from Sara.

Burns indicates that young Franklin Roosevelt was self-assured and at ease in the upper class. On the other hand, Eleanor was shy and insecure, and initially focused on her husband's career. As his father had done, Franklin left childcare to his wife, and Eleanor assigned the task to caregivers. They had six children. Their only daughter, Anna, was born in 1906. James was born in 1907. The couple's second son, Franklin, died in infancy in 1909. Elliott was born in 1910, another son named Franklin followed in 1914, and the youngest, John, was born in 1916.

Roosevelt had multiple extramarital affairs. He commenced an affair with Eleanor's social secretary, Lucy Mercer, soon after she was hired in 1914. Eleanor discovered the affair in 1918. Franklin contemplated divorcing Eleanor, but Sara objected, and Mercer would not marry a divorced man with five children. Franklin promised never to see Mercer again, but his marriage to Eleanor shifted to become a political partnership. Eleanor soon established a separate home in Hyde Park at Val-Kill and devoted herself to social and political causes independent of her husband. Franklin broke his promise: he and Mercer maintained a correspondence and began seeing each other again by 1941. Roosevelt's son Elliott claimed that his father also had an affair with his private secretary, Missy LeHand.

== Early career (1910–1920) ==
=== New York state senator (1910–1913) ===
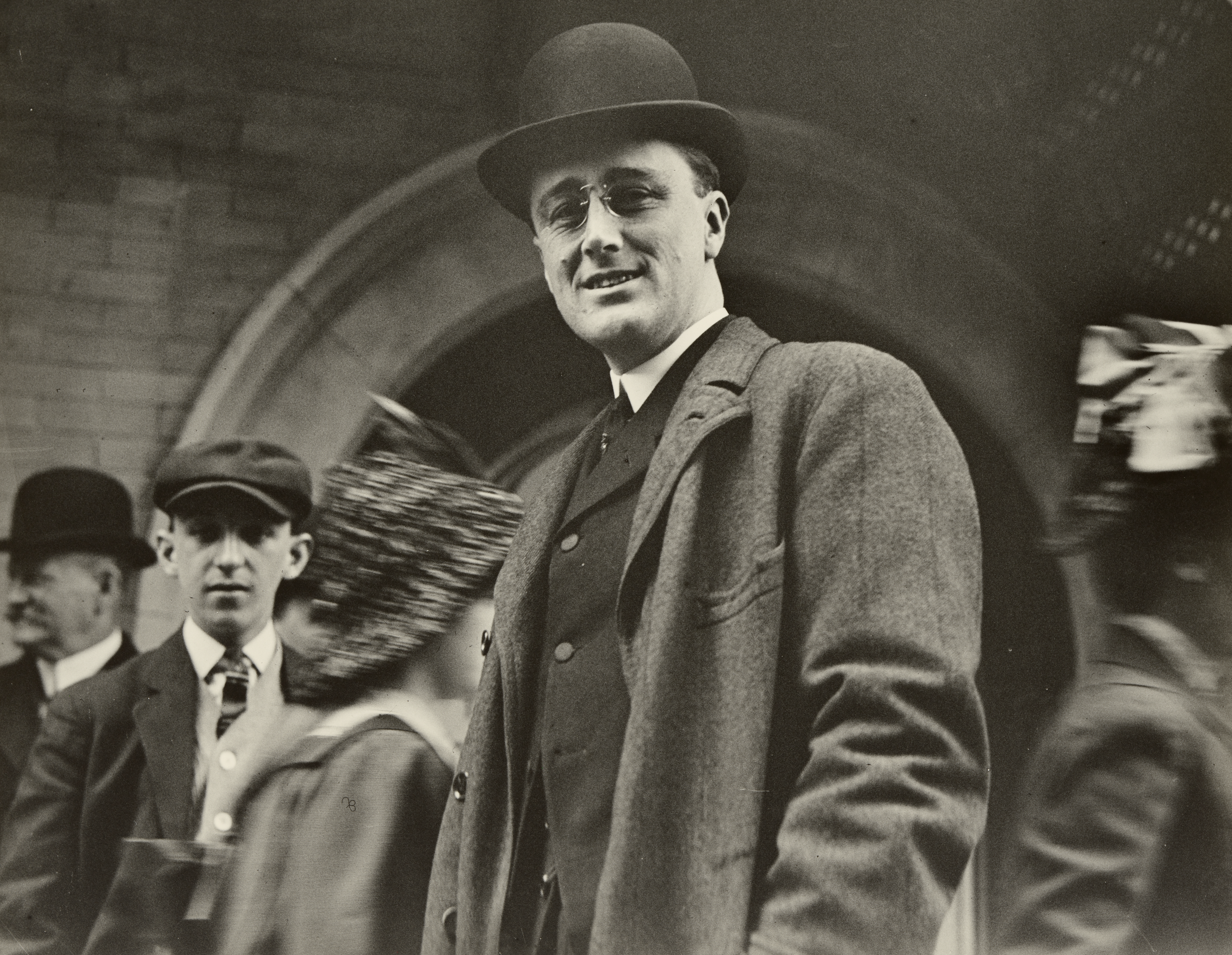
Roosevelt in 1912

In 1908, Roosevelt took an unsalaried position with the prestigious law firm of Carter Ledyard & Milburn, later moving into the firm's admiralty law division. Roosevelt cared little for the practice of law and told friends he planned to enter politics. Despite his admiration for his Republican cousin Theodore, Franklin accepted an invitation to run for the Democratic Party in the 1910 elections for the New York State Assembly. He was a compelling candidate due to his name recognition and his family's financial and social backing, but his campaign ended after the Democratic incumbent, Lewis Stuyvesant Chanler, chose to seek re-election. Rather than putting his political hopes on hold, Roosevelt ran for a seat in the New York State Senate. The senate district, located in Dutchess, Columbia, and Putnam Counties, was strongly Republican. Roosevelt feared that opposition from Theodore could end his campaign, but Theodore encouraged his candidacy despite their party differences. Acting as his own campaign manager, Roosevelt traveled throughout the senate district via automobile, at a time when few could afford a car. In the Democratic landslide in the 1910 United States elections, Roosevelt won a surprising victory.

Despite short legislative sessions, Roosevelt treated his new position as a full-time career. Taking his seat on January 1, 1911, Roosevelt soon became the leader of the "Insurgents" in opposition to the Tammany Hall machine that dominated the state Democratic Party. In the 1911 US Senate election, Roosevelt and nineteen other Democrats caused a prolonged deadlock by opposing the Tammany-backed candidate. (Note: At that time, state legislatures elected US senators.) This made him a well-known figure in the press. News articles and cartoons depicted "the second coming of a Roosevelt" sending "cold shivers down the spine" of Tammany Hall. Roosevelt also opposed Tammany Hall by supporting Woodrow Wilson's successful bid for the 1912 Democratic nomination. With help from journalist Louis McHenry Howe, he was re-elected in 1912. After the election, he chaired the Agriculture Committee; his work on farm and labor bills was a precursor to his later New Deal policies.

=== Assistant Secretary of the Navy (1913–1920) ===
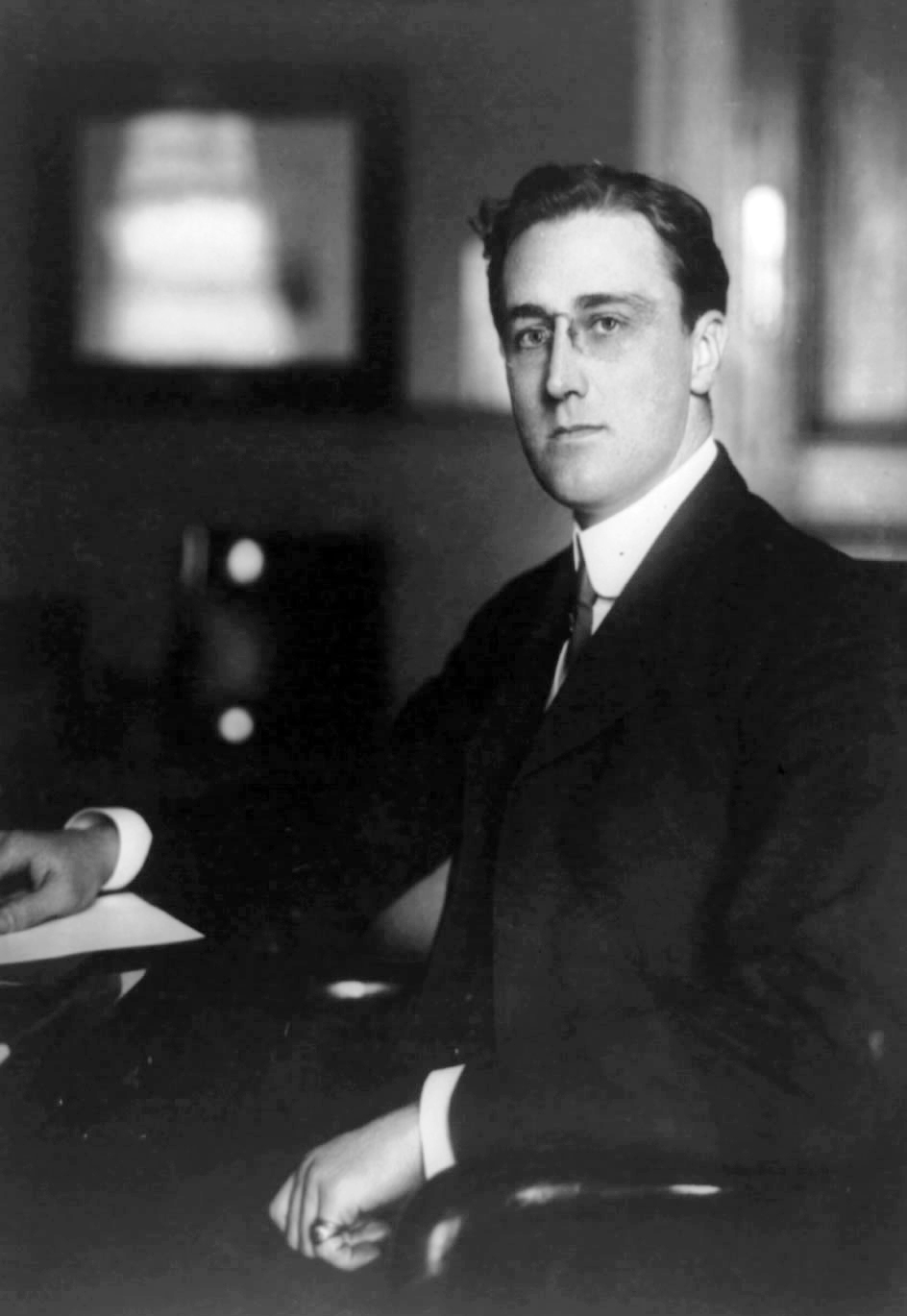
Roosevelt as Assistant Secretary of the Navy, 1913

Roosevelt's support of Wilson led to his desired appointment in March 1913 as Assistant Secretary of the Navy, the second-ranking official in the Navy Department after Secretary Josephus Daniels, who tended towards pacifism. Roosevelt was enthusiastic (sometimes to the point of insubordination) and "an impassioned promoter of the Navy" who "viewed himself as a vital voice for national defense". Daniels and Roosevelt instituted a merit-based promotion system and extended civilian control over the autonomous departments of the Navy. Roosevelt oversaw the Navy's civilian employees and gained valuable experience working with both union leaders and with Congress. Roosevelt sometimes lent assistance to discriminatory policies of Wilson and Daniels. In 1916, for example, he carried out an order to designate at considerable expense separate toilets for "the use of [white] women, white men and colored." The NAACP and civil rights organizations objected so strenuously that the order was rescinded without explanation a month later.

In 1914, Roosevelt ran for the seat of retiring Republican Senator Elihu Root of New York. Though he had the backing of Treasury Secretary William Gibbs McAdoo and Governor Martin H. Glynn, he faced a formidable opponent in Tammany Hall's James W. Gerard. He also was without Wilson's support, as the president needed Tammany's forces for his legislation and 1916 re-election. Roosevelt was soundly defeated in the Democratic primary. After the election, he and Tammany Hall boss Charles Francis Murphy became allies.

Roosevelt refocused on the Navy Department when World War I broke out in 1914. Though he remained publicly supportive of Wilson, Roosevelt was privately opposed to neutrality. Following the sinking of the RMS Lusitania by a German submarine, Roosevelt helped establish the US Navy Reserve and proposed the Council of National Defense. In April 1917, after Germany declared it would engage in unrestricted submarine warfare and attacked several US ships, Congress approved Wilson's call for a declaration of war on Germany.

Roosevelt requested that he be allowed to serve as a naval officer, but Wilson insisted that he continue as Assistant Secretary. For the next year, Roosevelt coordinated the naval deployment from Washington, as the Navy expanded fourfold. In the summer of 1918, Roosevelt traveled to Europe to inspect naval installations and meet with French and British officials, including King George V and prime ministers David Lloyd George and Georges Clemenceau. In September, on the ship voyage back to the US, he contracted pandemic influenza with complicating pneumonia, which left him unable to work for a month. After the Armistice of 11 November 1918, Daniels and Roosevelt supervised the demobilization of the Navy. Against the advice of older officers such as Admiral William S. Benson—who claimed he could not "conceive of any use the fleet will ever have for aviation"—Roosevelt argued for the preservation of the Navy's Aviation Division. He also approved the investigation that led to the Newport sex scandal, for which he was reprimanded by a 1921 congresional subcommittee.

=== 1920 vice presidential campaign ===
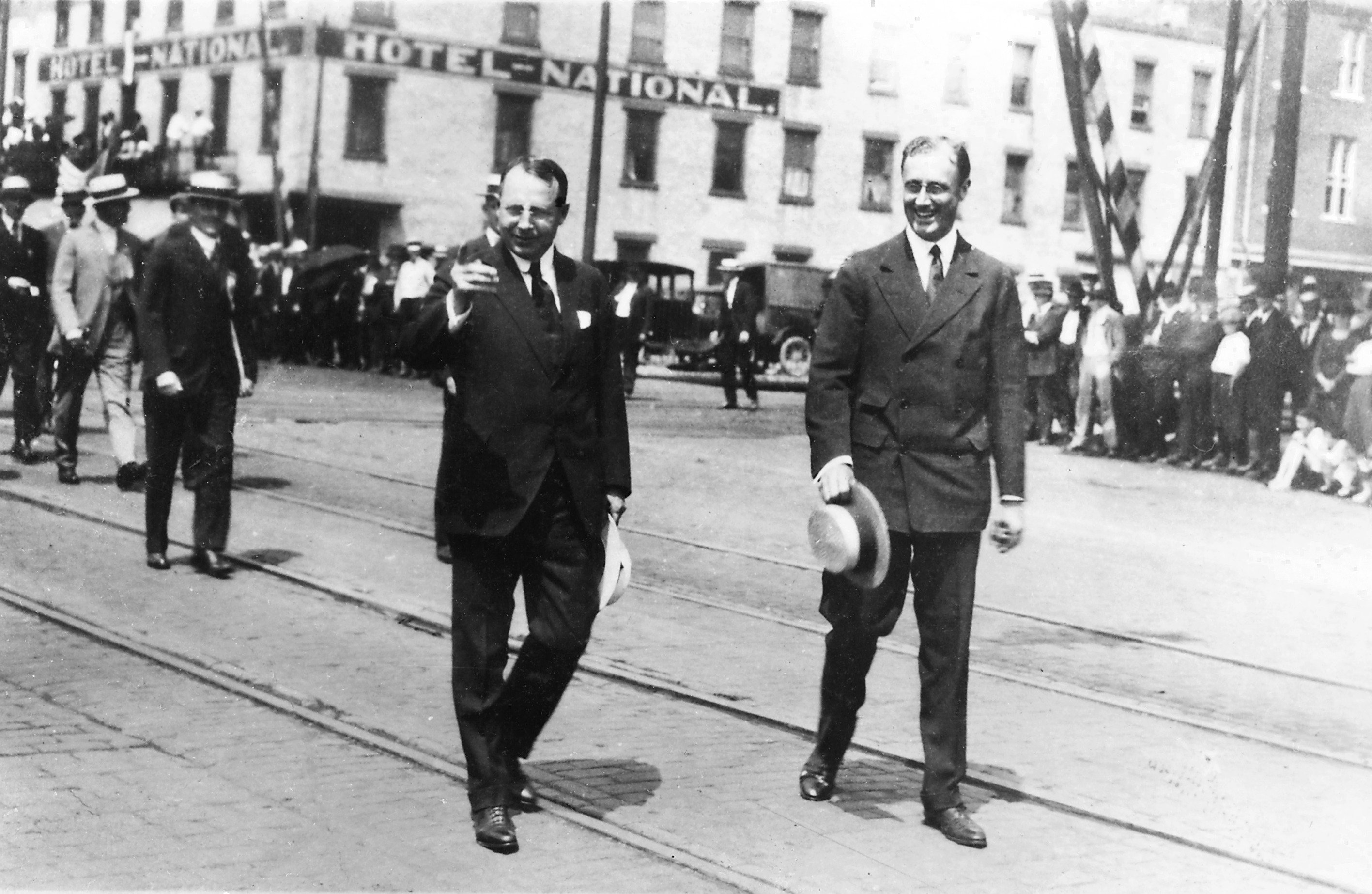
Cox and Roosevelt in Ohio, 1920

With Wilson's presidency nearing its end, Roosevelt planned his next run for office. He approached the public-minded businessman Herbert Hoover about running for the 1920 Democratic presidential nomination, with Roosevelt as his running mate. Roosevelt's plan for Hoover to run fell through after Hoover declared his alignment with the Republican Party, but Roosevelt continued to seek the 1920 vice presidential nomination. After Governor James M. Cox of Ohio won the party's presidential nomination at the 1920 Democratic National Convention, he chose Roosevelt as his running mate. Although his nomination surprised most people, he balanced the ticket as a moderate and a prohibitionist with a famous name.

During the campaign, Cox and Roosevelt defended Wilson's presidency and the League of Nations, both of which were unpopular in 1920. Roosevelt personally supported US membership in the League, but, unlike Wilson, he favored compromising with Senator Henry Cabot Lodge and other "Reservationists". Republican Warren G. Harding and his running mate Calvin Coolidge defeated the Cox–Roosevelt ticket in the presidential election by a wide margin. Roosevelt later reflected that the relationships and goodwill that he built in the 1920 campaign proved to be a major asset in his 1932 campaign. The 1920 election also saw the first public participation of Eleanor Roosevelt, who established herself as a valuable political player. After the election, Roosevelt returned to New York City, where he practiced law and served as a vice president of the Fidelity and Deposit Company.

== Paralytic illness and political comeback (1921–1928) ==
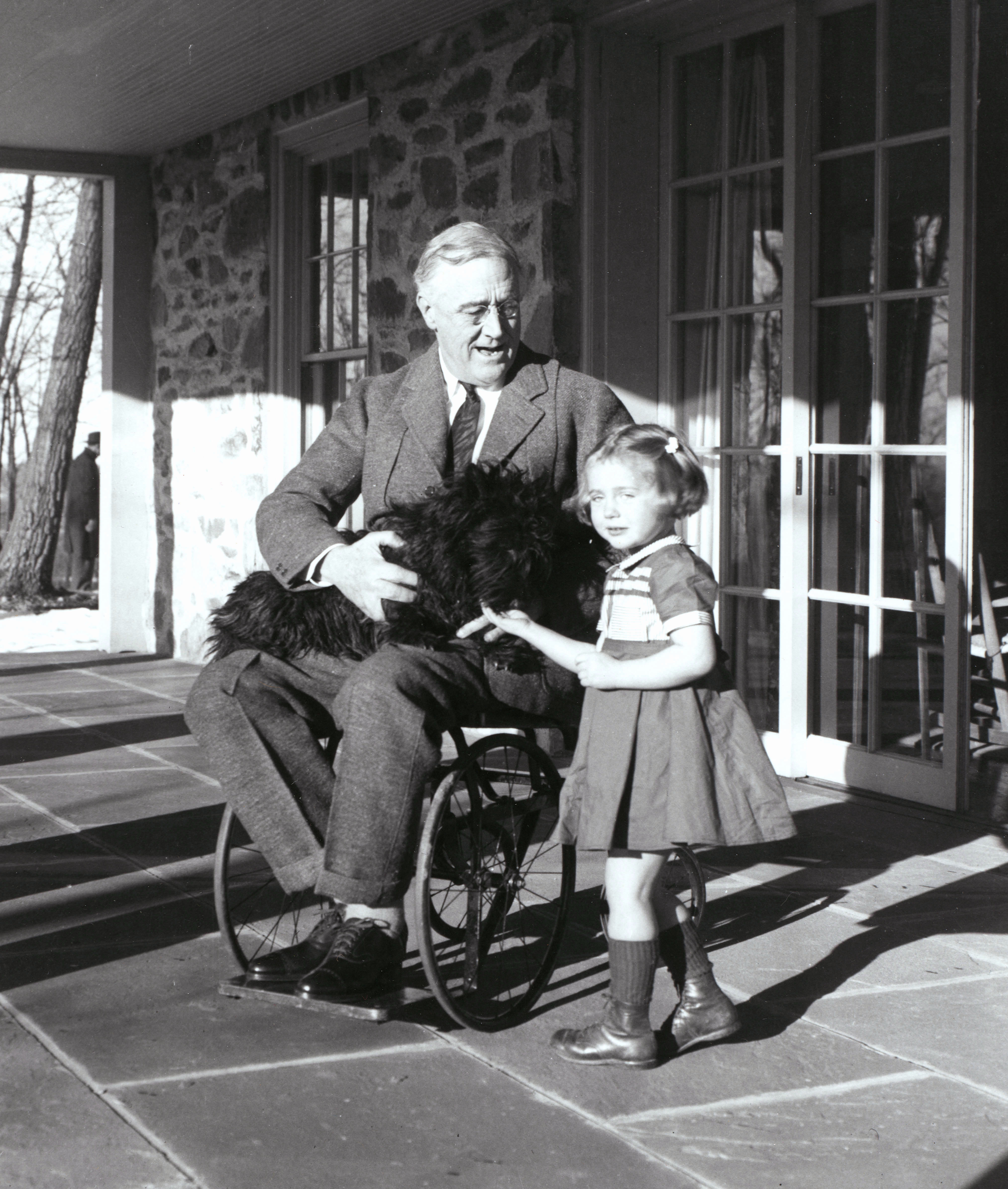
Rare photograph of Roosevelt in a wheelchair, with Fala and Ruthie Bie, the daughter of caretakers at his Hyde Park estate, February 1941

Roosevelt sought to build support for a political comeback in the 1922 elections. However, he became ill while the Roosevelts were vacationing at Campobello Island in August 1921. He was diagnosed with polio which left him permanently paralyzed from the waist down. A 2003 study favored a diagnosis of Guillain–Barré syndrome, but historians have continued to describe his paralysis according to the initial diagnosis. (Note: In his Pulitzer Prize-winning book Polio: An American Story, David Oshinsky concluded: "What is certain, however, is that FDR believed he had polio, as did his family, his doctors, other polio victims, and the American public. Without him, the great polio crusade would never have been launched".) Though his mother favored his retirement, Roosevelt, his wife, and Roosevelt's close friend and adviser, Louis Howe, were all determined that he continue his political career. Roosevelt laboriously taught himself to walk short distances with iron braces on his hips and legs. He was careful never to be seen using his wheelchair in public, and great care was taken to prevent any portrayal in the press that would highlight his disability.

Beginning in 1925, Roosevelt spent most of his time in the Southern US, at first on his houseboat, the Larooco. Intrigued by the potential benefits of hydrotherapy, he used most of his inheritance to establish a rehabilitation center at Warm Springs, Georgia, in 1926, assembling a staff of physical therapists who led an orthotics laboratory and later a postgraduate school. In 1938, he organized what would become the National Foundation for Infantile Paralysis, leading to the development of polio vaccines.

Roosevelt issued an open letter endorsing Al Smith's successful campaign in New York's 1922 gubernatorial election, which both aided Smith and showed Roosevelt's continuing relevance as a political figure. Roosevelt and Smith never fully trusted one another, but Roosevelt supported Smith's progressive policies, while Smith was happy to have Roosevelt's backing. Roosevelt gave presidential nominating speeches for Smith at the 1924 and 1928 Democratic National Conventions; the speech delivered at the 1924 convention marked a return to public life following his illness. That year, the Democrats were badly divided between an urban wing, led by Smith, and a conservative, rural wing, led by William Gibbs McAdoo. On the 103rd ballot, the nomination went to John W. Davis, a compromise candidate who suffered a landslide defeat in the 1924 presidential election.

From 1925 until 1928, Roosevelt chaired the Taconic State Park Commission, tasked with planning the Taconic State Parkway. In this role, he clashed with Robert Moses, a key Smith ally and then the president of the New York State Council of Parks. Roosevelt was unhappy with Moses diverting funds to developments on Long Island, and Moses worked to block the appointment of Howe to a salaried position with the Taconic commission. Roosevelt's contentious relationship with Moses continued as their careers progressed.

== Governor of New York (1929–1932) ==
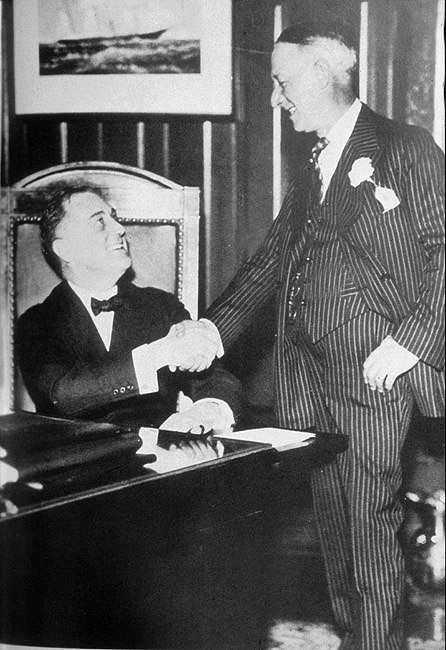
Governor Roosevelt with his predecessor Al Smith, 1930

Smith, the Democratic presidential nominee in the 1928 election, asked Roosevelt to run for governor of New York in the 1928 state election. Roosevelt initially resisted, as he was reluctant to leave Warm Springs and feared a Republican landslide. Party leaders eventually convinced him only he could defeat the Republican gubernatorial nominee, New York Attorney General Albert Ottinger. While Smith lost the presidency in a landslide, Roosevelt was elected governor by less than a one-percent margin. Relations between Roosevelt and Smith suffered after he chose not to retain key Smith appointees. He and Eleanor established an understanding for the rest of his career: she would dutifully serve as the governor's wife but would also be free to pursue her own interests.

As governor, Roosevelt proposed the construction of hydroelectric power plants and addressed the ongoing farm crisis of the 1920s. He began holding "fireside chats" in which he addressed his constituents via radio, taking advantage of this medium to pressure the New York State Legislature into advancing his agenda. The Wall Street Crash of 1929 that October began the Great Depression. Roosevelt was, according to the biographer Jean Edward Smith, "among the first state governors to recognize the seriousness of the Depression"; he established the first state employment commission and became the first governor to publicly endorse the idea of unemployment insurance. In 1930, Roosevelt passed through the legislature a bill creating old-age pensions for New Yorkers.

Roosevelt was re-elected to a second term in the 1930 election. He proposed an economic relief package and the establishment of the Temporary Emergency Relief Administration. Led first by Jesse I. Straus and then by Harry Hopkins, the agency assisted over one-third of New York's population between 1932 and 1938. Roosevelt supported reforestation with the Hewitt Amendment in 1931, which gave birth to New York's state forest system. The Temporary Emergency Relief Administration was essentially a state-level predecessor of the federal Civilian Conservation Corps Roosevelt would create as president, with over 10,000 men building fire trails, combating soil erosion and planting trees.

Roosevelt also began an investigation into corruption in New York City among the judiciary, the police force, and organized crime, prompting the creation of the Seabury Commission. The Seabury investigations exposed an extortion ring, led many public officials to be removed from office, and made the decline of Tammany Hall inevitable.

== 1932 presidential election and transition ==
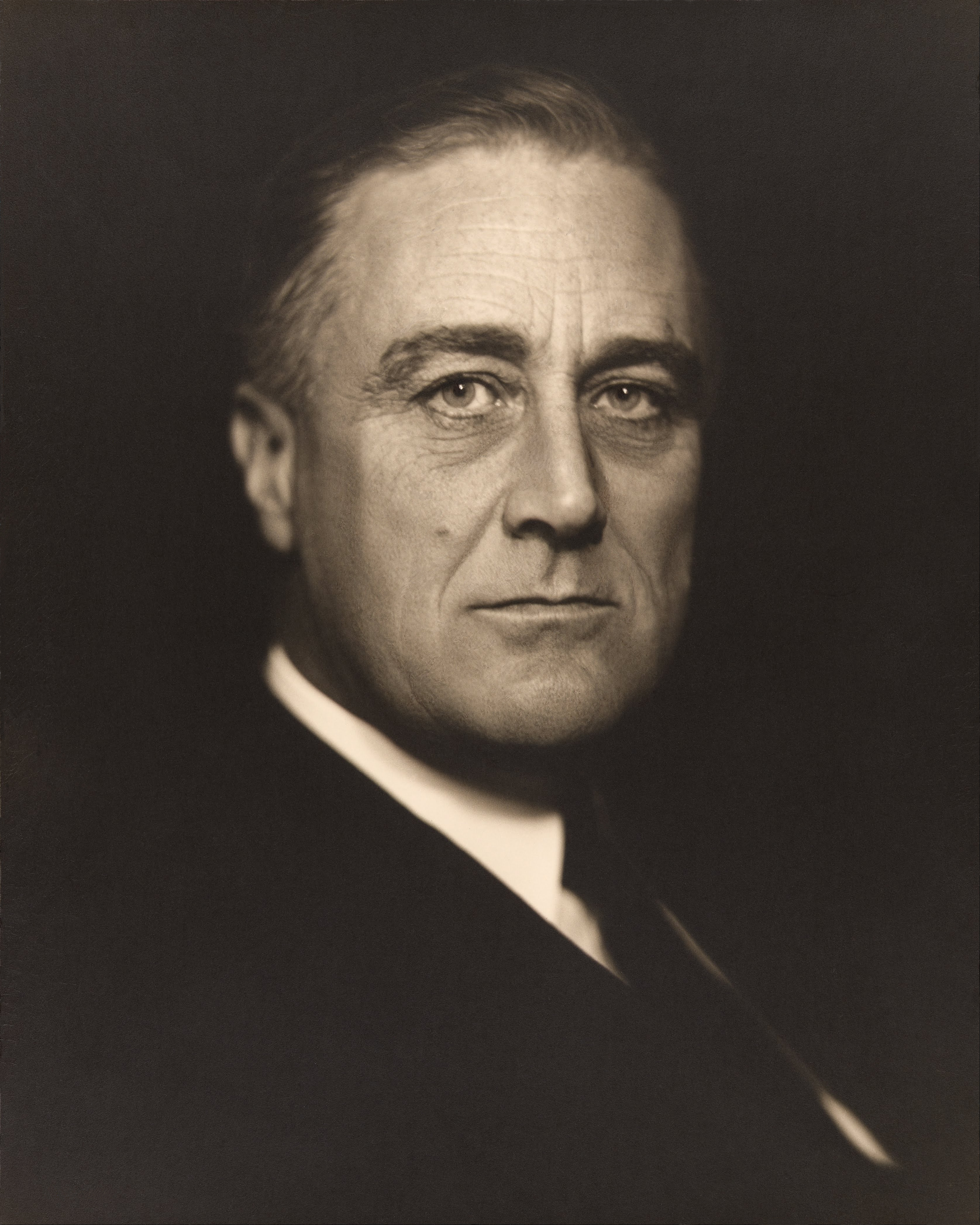
Roosevelt in the early 1930s

As the 1932 presidential election approached, Roosevelt established a campaign team led by Howe and Farley, and a "brain trust" of policy advisers, primarily composed of Columbia University professors. Some were doubtful about his campaign, such as the political commentator Walter Lippmann, who observed: "He is a pleasant man who, without any important qualifications for the office, would very much like to be president." However, Roosevelt's work as governor to address the impact of the Depression in New York established him as the front-runner for the nomination. Opposing candidates included Speaker of the House John Nance Garner of Texas and Al Smith, the 1928 Democratic presidential nominee.

1932 electoral vote results

Roosevelt entered the convention with a delegate lead due to his success in the 1932 Democratic primaries. He clinched the nomination on the fourth ballot. Garner was subsequently named his running mate. Roosevelt flew from New York to Chicago after learning that he had won the nomination, becoming the first major-party presidential nominee to accept the nomination in person. His appearance was necessary to demonstrate his vitality despite his physical disability.

In his acceptance speech, Roosevelt declared, "I pledge you, I pledge myself, to a new deal for the American people... This is more than a political campaign; it is a call to arms." Roosevelt promised securities regulation, tariff reduction, farm relief, government-funded public works, and other actions to address the Great Depression. Otherwise, Roosevelt's primary campaign strategy was one of caution, intent upon avoiding mistakes that would distract from Hoover's failings on the economy. Hoover's handling of the Bonus Army further damaged the incumbent's popularity, as newspapers across the country criticized the use of the army to disperse the assembled veterans.

Roosevelt won 57% of the popular vote and carried all but six states. His victory was enabled by the creation of the New Deal coalition: small farmers, Southern Whites, Irish Catholics, big-city political machines, labor unions, northern Black Americans (southern ones were still disfranchised), Jews, and political liberals. This coalition represented a political realignment towards the Democrats and started the "New Deal Party System" or the Fifth Party System.

President Hoover sought to convince Roosevelt to renounce much of his campaign platform and to endorse Hoover's traditional economic policies, but the president-elect rejected him. According to the historian Robert Dallek, "Roosevelt not only viewed Hoover's policies as shortsighted but considered any association with him as potentially damaging". During the transition, Roosevelt chose Howe as his chief of staff, and Farley as Postmaster General. Frances Perkins, as Secretary of Labor, became the first woman appointed to a cabinet position. William H. Woodin, a Republican industrialist close to Roosevelt, was chosen for Secretary of the Treasury, while Roosevelt chose Senator Cordell Hull as Secretary of State. Harold L. Ickes and Henry A. Wallace, two progressive Republicans, were selected for Secretary of the Interior and Secretary of Agriculture, respectively.

In February 1933, Roosevelt escaped an assassination attempt while sitting in an open car in Florida. A woman hit Giuseppe Zangara with her handbag as he fired five shots toward the car with a handgun. Chicago Mayor Anton Cermak was struck and killed.

== Presidency (1933–1945) ==
Roosevelt made all of his administration's major decisions himself, regardless of delays, inefficiencies, or resentments this may have caused. Analyzing the president's administrative style, Burns concludes:

The president stayed in charge of his administration... by drawing fully on his formal and informal powers as Chief Executive; by raising goals, creating momentum, inspiring a personal loyalty, getting the best out of people... by deliberately fostering among his aides a sense of competition and a clash of wills that led to disarray, heartbreak, and anger but also set off pulses of executive energy and sparks of creativity... by handing out one job to several men and several jobs to one man, thus strengthening his own position as a court of appeals, as a depository of information, and as a tool of co-ordination; by ignoring or bypassing collective decision-making agencies, such as the Cabinet... and always by persuading, flattering, juggling, improvising, reshuffling, harmonizing, conciliating, manipulating.

=== First and second terms (1933–1941) ===
==== First New Deal (1933–1934) ====
Nothing to Fear
Sample of Roosevelt's first inaugural speech

By early 1933, the US was at the nadir of the Great Depression. At least a quarter of the workforce was unemployed, and an estimated 1.2 million people were homeless. By March 3, the eve of Roosevelt's inauguration, 32 of the 48 states—as well as the District of Columbia—had closed their banks. Historians categorized Roosevelt's program as "relief, recovery, and reform": relief for the unemployed, recovery in boosting the economy back to normal, and reform of the financial and banking systems. Roosevelt presented his proposals directly to the American public in a series of radio addresses known as fireside chats.

One of his first actions in office was to declare a national "bank holiday". He convened a special session of Congress on March 9, when Congress passed the Emergency Banking Act with very limited review. The act was drafted by members of Hoover's cabinet; according to the author Jonathan Alter, it gave the president "unprecedented control over the financial system", and authorized the Federal Reserve Banks to issue banknotes. In the weeks after the holiday ended on March 15, over $1 billion was deposited, ending the bank panic. The "Hundred Days Congress" set a benchmark against which future presidents have been compared. On March 22, Roosevelt signed the Cullen–Harrison Act, permitting the sale of beer; Prohibition was officially repealed in December with the 21st Amendment.

Roosevelt signed the Economy Act in an effort to cut the federal government budget. This included a reduction in military spending from $752 million in 1932 to $531 million in 1934, and a 40% cut to veteran benefits; over 500,000 veterans and dependents lost pensions. The veterans were well organized and strongly protested, so most benefits were later restored or increased. Congress overrode the President's veto and passed the Bonus Act in January 1936. This pumped sums equal to 2% of the GDP into the consumer economy and had a major stimulus effect.

Roosevelt saw the establishment of a number of agencies and measures designed to provide relief. The Federal Emergency Relief Administration, under the leadership of Harry Hopkins, distributed relief to state governments. The Public Works Administration (PWA), under Secretary of the Interior Harold Ickes, oversaw the construction of large-scale public works such as sewer systems and lighthouses. The Rural Electrification Administration (REA) increased the share of farms with electricity from 1% to almost 50% by 1941. The Civilian Conservation Corps (CCC) hired an initial 250,000 unemployed men for rural projects; it ultimately employed over 3.2 million total. This included over 2,600 veterans who participated in the second Bonus Army march in May 1933. Roosevelt also expanded Hoover's Reconstruction Finance Corporation, which funded railroads and banks. Congress gave the Federal Trade Commission broad regulatory powers and provided mortgage relief to millions of farmers and homeowners. Roosevelt also set up the Agricultural Adjustment Administration to increase commodity prices, by paying farmers to leave land uncultivated and cut herds. The policies were criticized when some crops were intentionally plowed under and livestock slaughtered; it also accelerated the transition from smallholding to commercial farming.

Economic reform was the goal of the National Industrial Recovery Act (NIRA) of 1933, which established the National Recovery Administration. The act established the first federal minimum wage and supported collective bargaining, but also suspended antitrust laws and encouraged price-fixing. NIRA was ineffective and became unpopular, and the Supreme Court in May 1935 declared it unconstitutional. Roosevelt reformed financial regulations with the Glass–Steagall Act, creating the Federal Deposit Insurance Corporation to underwrite savings deposits. In 1934, the Securities and Exchange Commission was created to regulate investment firms, while the Federal Communications Commission sought to regulate telecommunications. The NIRA included $3.3 billion (equivalent to $82.08 billion in 2025) of spending through the Public Works Administration.

Roosevelt worked with Senator George W. Norris to create the Tennessee Valley Authority (TVA), which built dams and power stations, controlled erosion, and improved wages in the poverty-stricken Tennessee Valley. However, it displaced thousands of residents for these projects, many poor farmers and tenants. Roosevelt also declared that all gold privately held by American citizens was to be sold to the US Treasury and announced the abandonment of the gold standard and a devaluation of the dollar.

==== Second New Deal (1935–1936) ====
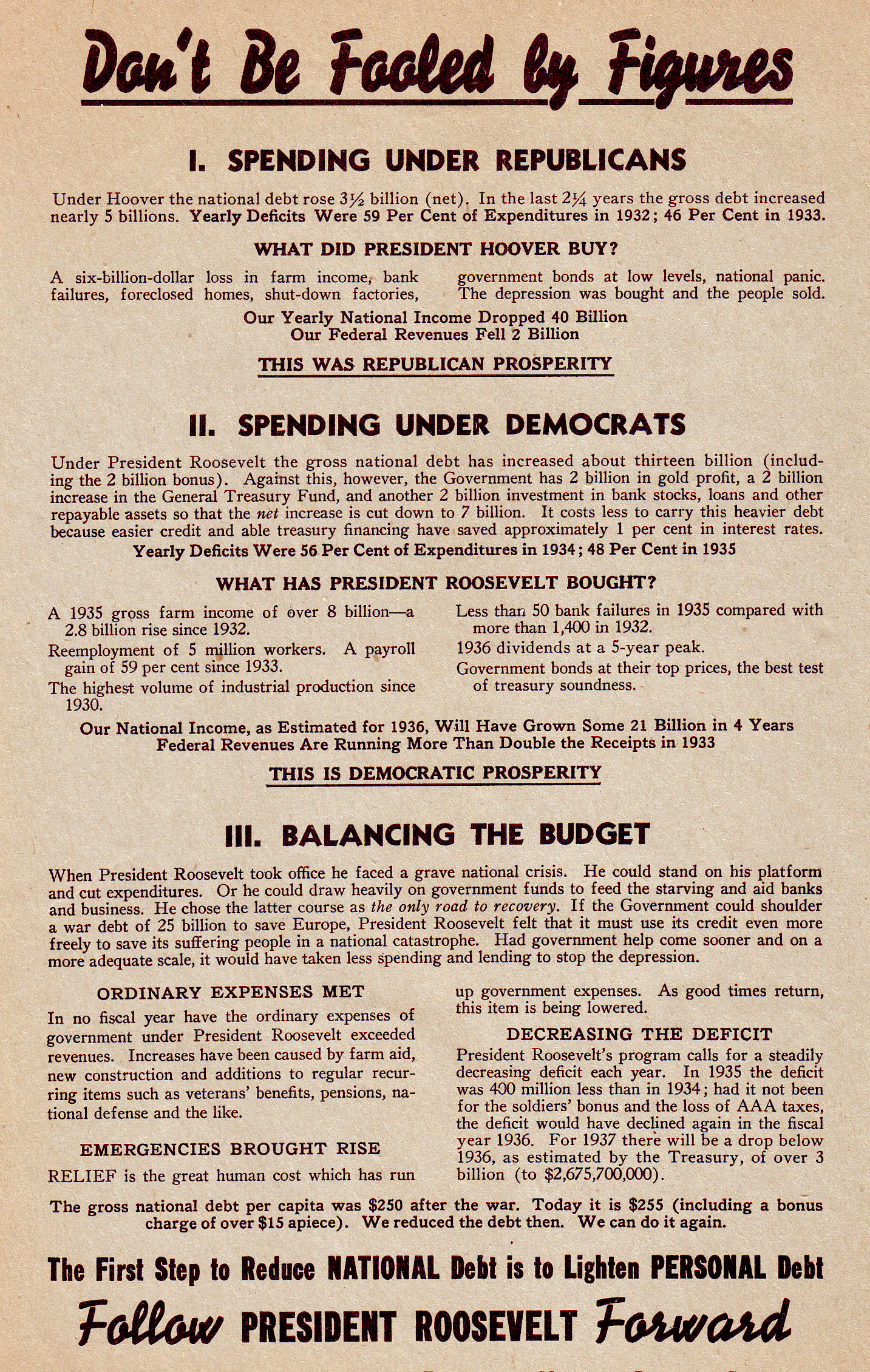
1936 re-election handbill for Roosevelt promoting his economic policy

Although the president's party had lost seats in most previous midterm elections, the Democrats gained seats in the 1934 Congressional elections. Empowered, Roosevelt made it a priority to create a social insurance program with the Social Security Act. Roosevelt insisted that it should be funded by payroll taxes, saying, "We put those payroll contributions there so as to give the contributors a legal, moral, and political right to collect their pensions and their unemployment benefits. With those taxes in there, no damn politician can ever scrap my social security program." Compared with the social security systems in other countries, the Social Security Act of 1935 was conservative. Against Roosevelt's original intention for universal coverage, the act excluded farmers and domestic workers, among others, totalling about forty percent of the labor force. Nevertheless, according to the historian William Leuchtenberg, it represented a "new landmark in American history" in instituting individual social rights.

After winning Congressional authorization for further funding of relief efforts, Roosevelt established the Works Progress Administration (WPA). Led by Harry Hopkins, the WPA employed over three million people in its first year. It undertook numerous massive construction projects in cooperation with local governments. It also supported the National Youth Administration and arts organizations. The National Labor Relations Act guaranteed workers the right to collective bargaining through unions of their own choice and established the National Labor Relations Board (NLRB). The act did not compel employers to reach an agreement with their employees, but David Kennedy wrote that it "opened a world of possibility to American labor". The result was a tremendous growth of union membership, especially in the mass-production sector. When the Flint sit-down strike threatened the production of General Motors, Roosevelt broke with the precedents of many former presidents and refused to intervene; the strike ultimately led to the unionization of both General Motors and US Steel.

While the First New Deal of 1933 focused on national unity and cooperation, the second was more progressive and supportive of minority groups (although Burns suggests that Roosevelt's policy decisions were guided more by pragmatism than ideology). Conservative Democrats, led by Jouett Shouse, fought back with the American Liberty League, equating Roosevelt with communism. However, this rhetoric let Roosevelt identify his opponents with the wealthy vested interests that opposed the New Deal, strengthening his political position. Labor unions, energized by labor legislation, signed up millions of new members and became a major backer of Roosevelt's re-election.

==== Election of 1936 ====
1936 electoral vote results

Eight million workers remained unemployed in 1936, and Roosevelt had lost the support of the business community because of his endorsement of the NLRB and the Social Security Act. National debt had doubled from 20% of the gross domestic product (GDP) when Roosevelt assumed the presidency to around 40% in 1936.

The Republicans nominated Kansas Governor Alf Landon; while Roosevelt campaigned on his New Deal programs and continued to attack Hoover, Landon sought to win voters who approved of the goals of the New Deal but not its implementation. Louisiana Senator Huey Long's "Share the Wealth" left-wing movement collapsed after his assassination; the remnants supported William Lemke of the newly formed Union Party. Roosevelt won re-nomination with little opposition at the 1936 Democratic National Convention, while his allies overcame Southern resistance to abolish a requirement that Democratic presidential candidates win the votes of two-thirds of the delegates rather than a simple majority. (Note: The biographer Jean Edward Smith notes that "the significance of the repeal of the two-thirds rule...is difficult to overstate. Not only did the power of the South in the Democratic party diminish, but without the repeal, it is open to question whether FDR could have been renominated in 1940.") In the general election, Roosevelt won nearly 61% of the popular vote and carried every state except Maine and Vermont. Democrats controlled over three-quarters of the seats in each house. The election also saw the consolidation of the New Deal coalition; while the Democrats lost some of their traditional allies in big business, they were replaced by groups such as organized labor and Black voters, the latter of whom voted Democratic for the first time since the American Civil War. Roosevelt lost high-income voters but made major gains among the poor and minorities. He won 86 percent of the Jewish vote, 81 percent of Catholics, 76 percent of Southerners, and 76 percent of Black voters in northern cities.

==== Supreme Court fight and second term legislation ====
Roosevelt's landslide victory empowered him to target the Supreme Court in his second term; the court had overturned many of his New Deal programs, as the more conservative justices upheld the principles of the Lochner era. Roosevelt proposed a judicial reform bill that would have allowed him to appoint an additional justice for each incumbent over the age of 70; in 1937, there were six. The size of the Court had been set at nine since 1869. A bipartisan coalition opposed the bill, and Chief Justice Charles Evans Hughes broke with precedent by publicly advocating its defeat.

Starting with the 1937 case of West Coast Hotel Co. v. Parrish, the court began to take a more favorable view of economic regulations; some scholars have described this as "the switch in time that saved nine" or a "constitutional revolution", although others saw it as part of a gradual transformation. That same year, Roosevelt appointed a Supreme Court Justice for the first time, and by 1941, had appointed seven of the court's nine justices. (Note: The two Justices who Roosevelt did not originally appoint to the Court were Harlan Fiske Stone and Owen Roberts. However, in 1941, Roosevelt elevated Stone to the position of Chief Justice.) After Parrish, the Court shifted its focus from judicial review of economic regulations to the protection of civil liberties.

With Roosevelt's influence on the wane following the failure of the Judicial Procedures Reform Bill of 1937, conservative Democrats joined with Republicans to block the implementation of further New Deal programs. Roosevelt did manage to pass some legislation, including the Housing Act of 1937, a second Agricultural Adjustment Act, and the Fair Labor Standards Act (FLSA) of 1938. The FLSA outlawed child labor and re-established a federal minimum wage, and set a standard forty-hour workweek beginning in 1940. Roosevelt also created the Executive Office of the President, making it "the nerve center of the federal administrative system".

When the economy began to deteriorate again in mid-1937, Roosevelt launched a rhetorical campaign against big business and monopoly power, alleging that the recession was the result of a capital strike and even ordering the Federal Bureau of Investigation to look for a criminal conspiracy (they found none). He then asked Congress for $5 billion (equivalent to $111.98 billion in 2025) in relief and public works funding. According to Alan Brinkley, this represented

the first time a president had explicitly endorsed the idea that stimulating mass consumption through deficit spending could promote economic growth. Ultimately the idea that federal fiscal policy was an effective tool by which government could regulate the economy... became one of the New Deal's most important policy innovations and one of its most significant legacies.

Determined to overcome the opposition of conservative Democrats in Congress, Roosevelt actively campaigned in the 1938 Democratic primaries for challengers who were more supportive of New Deal reform; he failed badly, managing to defeat only one. In the 1938 elections, the Republicans nearly doubled their representatives in the House. When Congress reconvened in 1939, Republicans under Senator Robert A. Taft formed a Conservative coalition with Southern Democrats, virtually ending Roosevelt's ability to enact his domestic proposals.

Roosevelt was active in expanding, funding, and promoting the National Park and National Forest systems. The park system's popularity soared, from 3 million visitors a year at the start of the decade to 15.1 million in 1939. The Civilian Conservation Corps built 13,000 miles (21,000 kilometers) of trails, planted over 2 billion trees, and created 800 state parks.

==== Foreign policy (1933–1941) ====
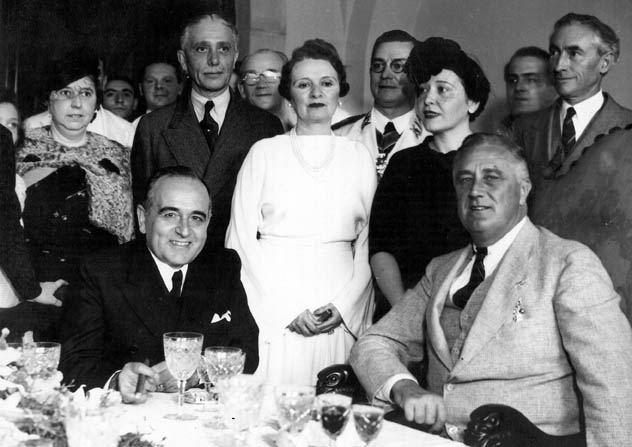
Roosevelt with Brazilian president Getúlio Vargas and other dignitaries in Brazil, 1936

Early in Roosevelt's presidency, international affairs were secondary to domestic concerns, and Roosevelt withdrew from the London Economic Conference. A significant foreign policy initiative of Roosevelt's first term was the Good Neighbor Policy in Latin America. He withdrew US forces from Haiti and reached new treaties with Cuba and Panama. In December 1933, Roosevelt signed the Montevideo Convention, renouncing the right to intervene unilaterally in the affairs of Latin American countries. Roosevelt also normalized relations with the Soviet Union, which the US had refused to recognize due to anti-Bolshevik sentiment in the 1920s. He hoped to renegotiate the Russian debt from World War I and open trade relations, but no progress was made and "both nations were soon disillusioned by the accord."

Despite Roosevelt's Wilsonian background, he acted with great care not to provoke isolationist sentiment. The isolationist movement was bolstered by the Neutrality Acts in the early to mid-1930s, stopping the "merchants of death" in the US from selling arms abroad. The president was refused a revision he requested giving him the discretion to allow the sale of arms to victims of aggression. Roosevelt largely acquiesced to Congress's non-interventionist policies in the early-to-mid 1930s, although he unsuccessfully tried to have the US join the World Court. He expressed regret in not aiding the Spanish Republicans in the Spanish Civil War, and had limited ability to aid China when Japan invaded in 1937.

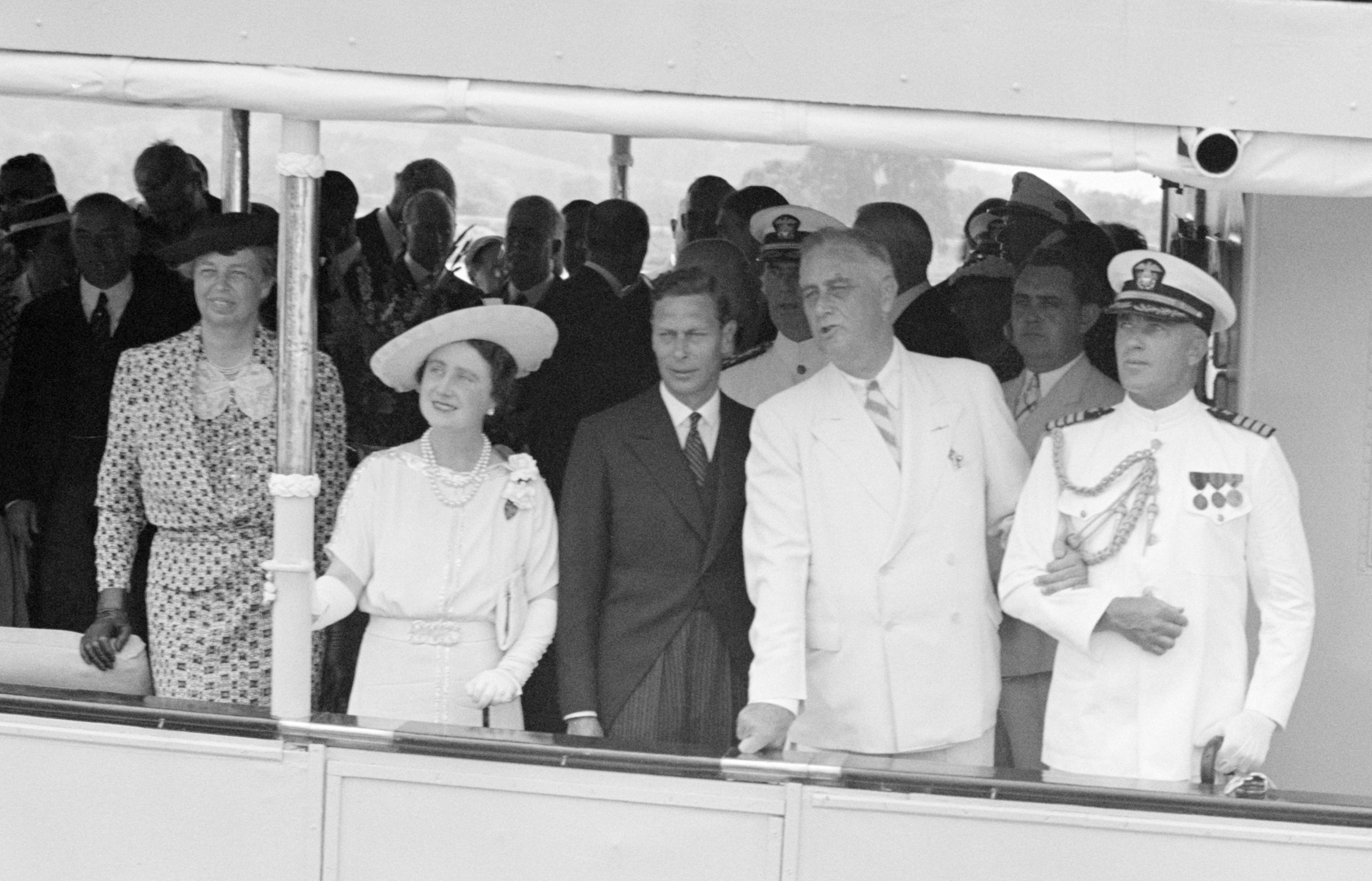
The Roosevelts with King George VI and Queen Elizabeth on the USS Potomac during the first US visit of a reigning British monarch (June 9, 1939)

After completion of the Munich Agreement and the execution of Kristallnacht, American public opinion turned against Germany, and Roosevelt began preparing for a possible war. Relying on an interventionist political coalition of Southern Democrats and business-oriented Republicans, Roosevelt oversaw the expansion of US airpower and war production capacity. When World War II began in September 1939 with Germany's invasion of Poland and Britain and France's declaration of war on Germany, Roosevelt sought ways to assist Britain and France. Isolationist leaders like Charles Lindbergh and Senator William Borah successfully mobilized opposition to Roosevelt's proposed repeal of the Neutrality Act, but Roosevelt won Congressional approval of the sale of arms on a cash-and-carry basis. He also began a regular secret correspondence with Britain's First Lord of the Admiralty, Winston Churchill, who became Prime Minister of the United Kingdom in 1940.

The Fall of France in June 1940 shocked the American public and, according to the historian Martin Zahniser, "opened the way to enormously enhanced US preparedness". In July 1940, Roosevelt appointed two interventionist Republicans, Henry L. Stimson and Frank Knox, as Secretaries of War and the Navy, respectively. In September 1940, the Burke–Wadsworth Act authorized the nation's first peacetime draft. The army increased from 190,000 men at the end of 1939 to 1.4 million in mid-1941. In September 1940, using his authority as Commander-in-Chief rather than Congressional approval, Roosevelt reached the Destroyers for Bases Agreement, which, in exchange for military base rights in the British Atlantic and Caribbean Islands, gave 50 American destroyers to Britain.

==== Election of 1940 ====
Leading up to the 1940 Democratic National Convention, there was much speculation as to whether Roosevelt would run for a third term. The two-term tradition, although not yet enshrined in the Constitution, (Note: The Twenty-second Amendment, ratified in 1951, would bar any individual from being elected to the presidency more than twice.) had been established by George Washington. Roosevelt refused to give a definitive statement, and he even indicated to some ambitious Democrats, such as James Farley, that they could seek the Democratic nomination. However, as Germany swept through Western Europe in mid-1940, Roosevelt decided that only he could see the nation safely through the Nazi threat. The party's political bosses feared that no Democrat but Roosevelt could defeat Wendell Willkie, the popular Republican nominee.

1940 electoral vote results

At the July 1940 Democratic Convention in Chicago, Roosevelt easily swept aside challenges from Farley and Garner. To replace Garner on the ticket, Roosevelt turned to Secretary of Agriculture Henry Wallace of Iowa, a former Republican who strongly supported the New Deal. The choice was strenuously opposed by many of the party's loyalists, but Roosevelt insisted that without Wallace on the ticket he would decline re-nomination, and after a convention appeal by Eleanor Roosevelt, Wallace won the vice-presidential nomination.

An August poll by Gallup found the race to be essentially tied, but Roosevelt's popularity surged in September, beginning with the announcement of the Destroyers for Bases Agreement. Willkie supported much of the New Deal as well as rearmament and aid to Britain but warned that Roosevelt would drag the country into another European war. Responding to Willkie's attacks, Roosevelt promised to keep the country out of "any foreign wars". Roosevelt won the 1940 election with 55.7% of the popular vote and 38 of the 48 states.

=== Third term (1941–1945) ===
==== Lead-up to the war ====
State of the Union (Four Freedoms) (January 6, 1941)
Franklin Delano Roosevelt's January 6, 1941 State of the Union Address introducing the theme of the Four Freedoms (starting at 32:02)

By late 1940, re-armament was in high gear, partly to expand and re-equip the Army and Navy and partly to become the "Arsenal of Democracy". With his Four Freedoms speech in January 1941, which proposed four fundamental freedoms that people "everywhere in the world" ought to enjoy (freedom of speech and expression, freedom of worship, freedom from want and freedom from fear), Roosevelt laid out the case for an Allied battle for basic rights worldwide. Assisted by Willkie, Roosevelt won Congressional approval of the Lend-Lease program, which directed massive military and economic aid to Britain and China. In sharp contrast to the loans of World War I, according to the historian Kathleen Burk, "the US...would extract recompense in non-monetary coin, such as future British policies, rather than forcing Britain to build up another set of war debts".

As Roosevelt took a firmer stance against the Axis powers, he was opposed by American isolationists such as Charles Lindbergh and the America First Committee. When Germany invaded the Soviet Union in June 1941, Roosevelt agreed to extend Lend-Lease to the Soviets. Thus, Roosevelt had committed the US to the Allied side with a policy of "all aid short of war". He authorized the creation of the Office of the Coordinator of Inter-American Affairs to counter perceived propaganda efforts in Latin America by the Axis. In August 1941, Roosevelt and Churchill conducted a secret bilateral meeting in which they drafted the Atlantic Charter, conceptually outlining global wartime and postwar goals. Though Churchill pressed for an American declaration of war against Germany, Roosevelt believed that Congress would reject any attempt. In September, a German submarine fired on the US destroyer Greer, and Roosevelt declared that the US Navy would assume an escort role for Allied convoys in the Atlantic as far east as Britain and would fire upon German ships or U-boats of the Kriegsmarine if they entered the US Navy zone. This "shoot on sight" policy brought the US Navy into direct conflict with German submarines and was favored by Americans by a margin of 2-to-1.

==== Pearl Harbor and declarations of war ====
FDR Pearl Harbor speech
Speech given before Joint Session of Congress in entirety. (3.1 MB, ogg/Vorbis format).

After the German invasion of Poland, the primary concern of both Roosevelt and his top military staff was the war in Europe, but Japan also presented foreign policy challenges. Relations with Japan had continually deteriorated since its invasion of Manchuria in 1931 and worsened further with Roosevelt's support of China. After Roosevelt announced a $100 million loan (equivalent to $2.3 billion in 2025) to China in reaction to Japan's occupation of northern French Indochina, Japan signed the Tripartite Pact with Germany and Italy; Germany, Japan, and Italy became known as the Axis powers. In July 1941, after Japan occupied the remainder of French Indochina, Roosevelt cut off the sale of oil to Japan, depriving Japan of more than 95 percent of its oil supply. He also placed the Philippine military under American command and reinstated General Douglas MacArthur to command US forces in the Philippines.

The Japanese were incensed by the embargo and determined to attack the US unless it was lifted. Roosevelt's cabinet was unwilling to reverse the policy, and Secretary of State Hull blocked a potential summit between Roosevelt and Prime Minister Fumimaro Konoe. (Note: Hull and others in the administration were unwilling to recognize the Japanese conquest of China and feared that an American accommodation with Japan would leave the Soviet Union vulnerable to a two-front war.) The Japanese believed that the destruction of the US Asiatic Fleet (stationed in the Philippines) and the US Pacific Fleet (stationed at Pearl Harbor in Hawaii) was vital to the conquest of Southeast Asia. On December 7, 1941, the Japanese launched a surprise attack on Pearl Harbor, knocking out the main American battleship fleet and killing 2,403 American servicemen and civilians. At the same time, separate Japanese task forces attacked Thailand, British Hong Kong, the Philippines, and other targets. Roosevelt called for war in his "Infamy Speech" to Congress, in which he said: "Yesterday, December 7, 1941—a date which will live in infamy—the United States of America was suddenly and deliberately attacked by naval and air forces of the Empire of Japan." In a nearly unanimous vote, Congress declared war on Japan. After Pearl Harbor, antiwar sentiment in the US largely evaporated overnight. On December 11, 1941, Hitler and Mussolini declared war on the US, which responded in kind. (Note: The US would also declare war on Bulgaria, Hungary, and Romania, all of which had joined the Axis bloc.)

A majority of scholars have rejected the conspiracy theories that Roosevelt, or other high government officials, knew in advance about the attack on Pearl Harbor. Senior American officials were aware that war was imminent, but they did not expect an attack on Pearl Harbor. Roosevelt assumed that the Japanese would attack either the Dutch East Indies or Thailand.

==== Wartime conferences ====
Chiang Kai-shek, Roosevelt, and Winston Churchill at the Cairo Conference

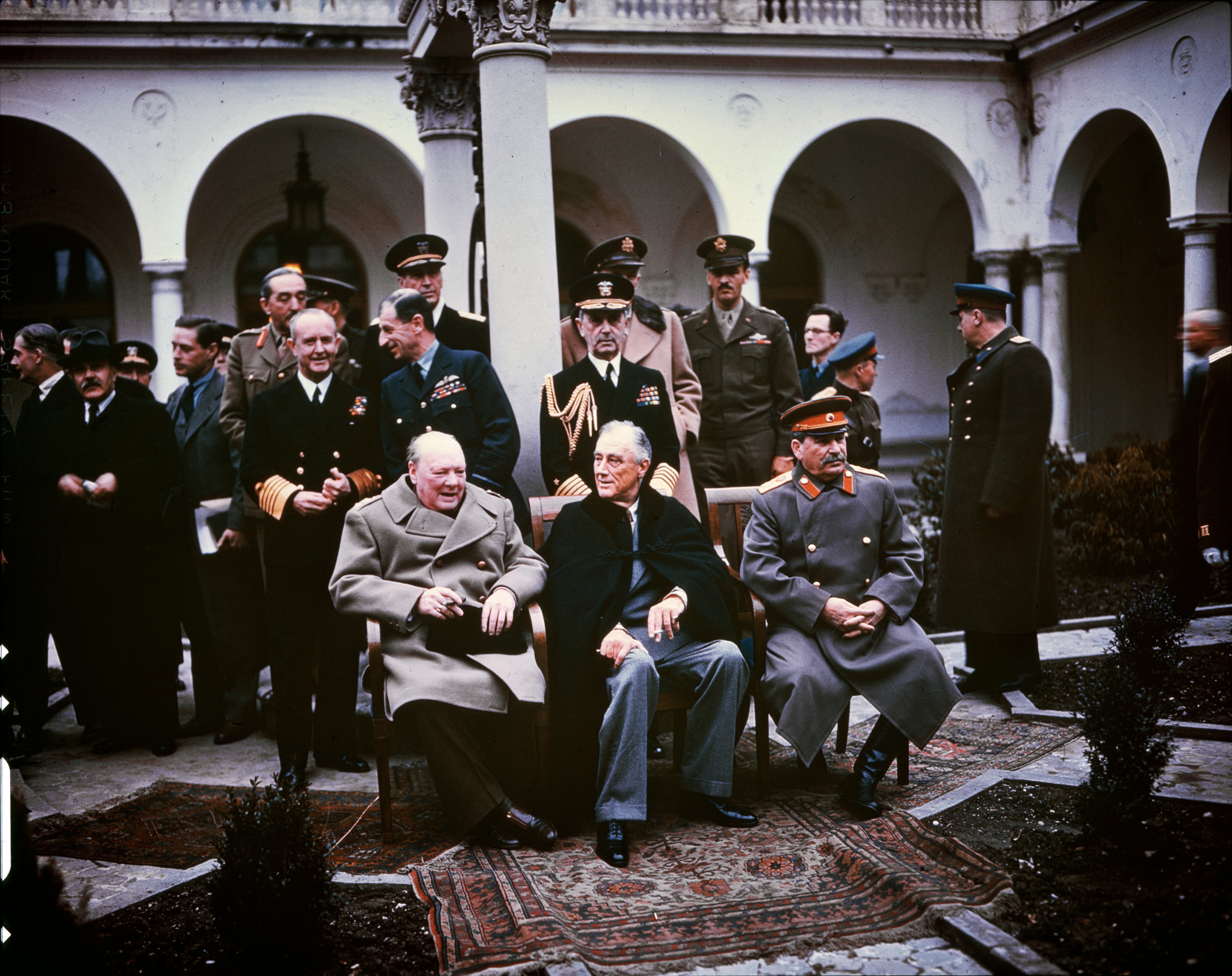
Churchill, Roosevelt, and Stalin at the Yalta Conference, February 1945, two months before Roosevelt's death

In late December 1941, Churchill and Roosevelt met at the Arcadia Conference and agreed on a Europe first strategy that prioritized the defeat of Germany before Japan. The US and Britain established the Combined Chiefs of Staff to coordinate military policy and the Combined Munitions Assignments Board to coordinate the allocation of supplies. On January 1, 1942, the US and the other Allied Powers issued the Declaration by United Nations, pledging to defeat the Axis powers. In 1942, Roosevelt formed the Joint Chiefs of Staff, which made the final decisions on American military strategy. Roosevelt avoided micromanaging the war and let his top military officers make most decisions, although he set the overall strategic course. Roosevelt conducted high-level diplomacy through his aides, especially Harry Hopkins, whose influence was bolstered by his control of the Lend-Lease funds. Roosevelt coined the term "Four Policemen" to refer to the "Big Four" Allied powers of World War II: the US, the United Kingdom, the Soviet Union, and China. The "Big Three" of Roosevelt, Winston Churchill, and Soviet leader Joseph Stalin, together with Chinese Generalissimo Chiang Kai-shek, cooperated informally on a plan in which American and British troops concentrated in the West; Soviet troops fought on the Eastern front; and Chinese, British and American troops fought in Asia and the Pacific. Beginning in May 1942, the Soviets urged an Anglo-American invasion of German-occupied France to divert troops from the Eastern front. Churchill and Roosevelt decided to delay such an invasion until at least 1943 and instead focus on a landing in North Africa. At the January 1943 Casablanca Conference between Roosevelt and Churchill, the Allies agreed to defeat Axis forces in North Africa and then launch an invasion of Sicily, with an attack on France to take place in 1944.

In November 1943, Roosevelt, Churchill, and Stalin met to discuss strategy and post-war plans at the Tehran Conference. Subsequent conferences at Bretton Woods and Dumbarton Oaks established the framework for the post-war international monetary system and the United Nations, an intergovernmental organization similar to the failed League of Nations. Roosevelt pushed the establishment of the United Nations as his highest postwar priority; he expected it would be controlled by Washington, Moscow, London and Beijing, and would resolve all major world problems.

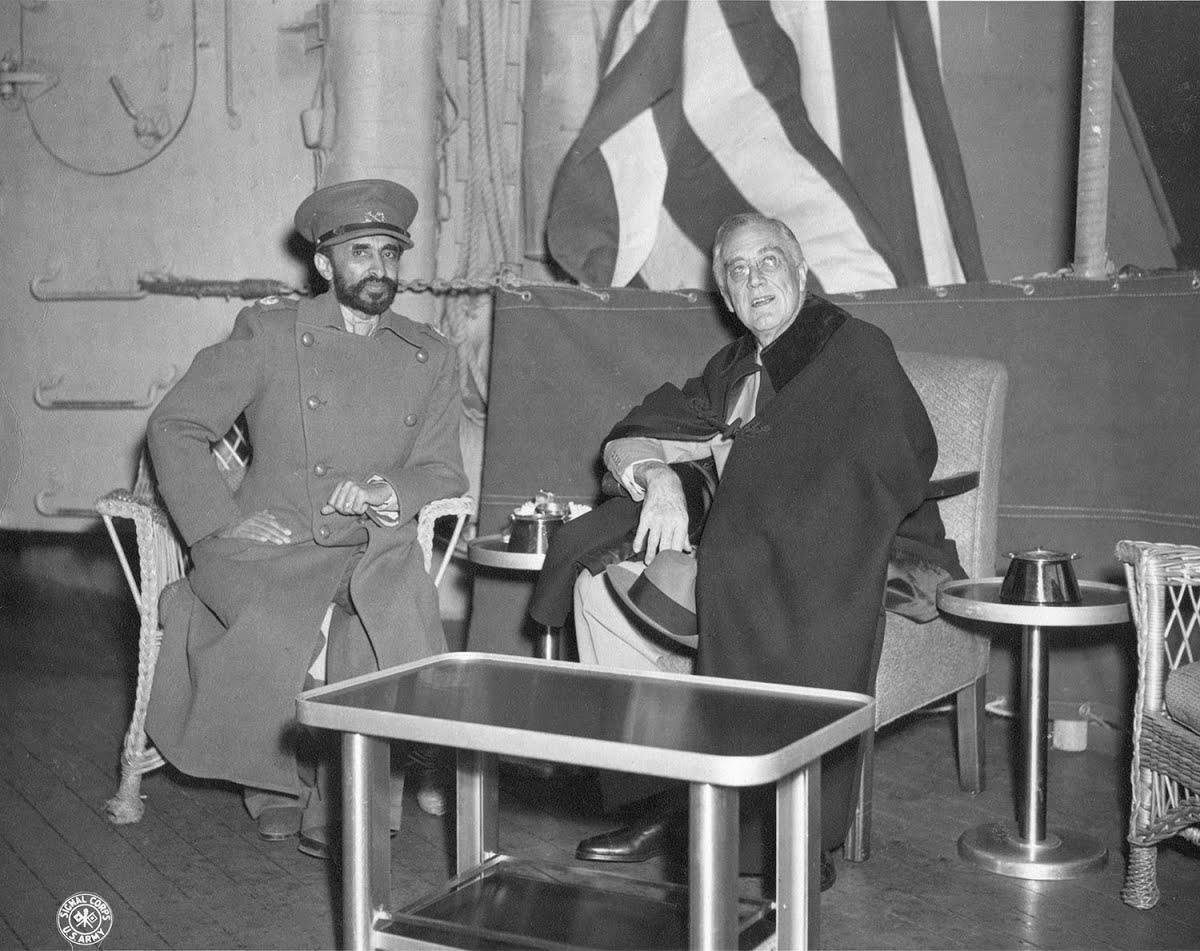
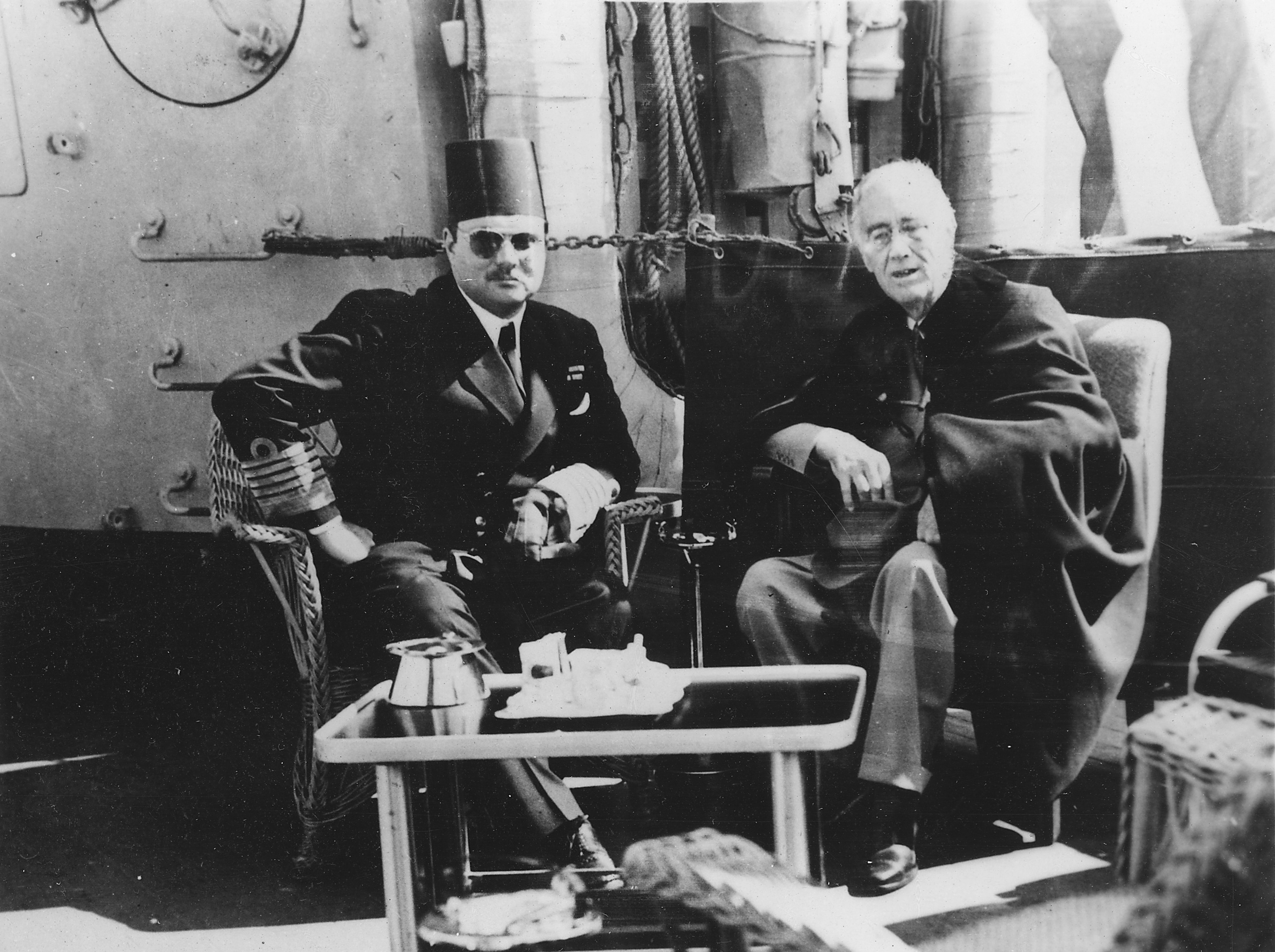
Ethiopian Emperor Haile Selassie I (left) and King Farouk of Egypt (right) on board USS Quincy (CA-71) in Great Bitter Lake, after the Yalta Conference, February 1945

Roosevelt, Churchill, and Stalin met for a second time at the February 1945 Yalta Conference. With the end of the war in Europe approaching, Roosevelt's primary focus was convincing Stalin to enter the war against Japan; the Joint Chiefs had estimated that an American invasion of Japan would cause as many as one million American casualties. In return, the Soviet Union was promised control of Asian territories such as Sakhalin Island. The three leaders agreed to hold a conference in 1945 to establish the United Nations, and they also agreed on the structure of the United Nations Security Council. Roosevelt did not push for the immediate evacuation of Soviet soldiers from Poland, but he won the issuance of the Declaration on Liberated Europe, which promised free elections in countries that had been occupied by Germany. Germany itself would be jointly occupied by the US, France, Britain, and the Soviet Union. Against Soviet pressure, Roosevelt and Churchill refused to impose huge reparations and deindustrialization on Germany after the war.

In March 1945, Roosevelt sent strongly worded messages to Stalin accusing him of breaking his Yalta commitments. Roosevelt's role in the Yalta Conference has been controversial; critics charge that he naively trusted the Soviet Union to allow free elections in Eastern Europe, while supporters argue that there was little more that Roosevelt could have done for the Eastern European countries given the Soviet occupation and the need for cooperation with the Soviet Union.

==== Course of the war ====
The Allies invaded French North Africa in November 1942 with Operation Torch, securing the surrender of Vichy French forces within days. In February 1943, the Soviet Union won a major victory at the Battle of Stalingrad, and in May 1943, the Allies secured the surrender of German and Italian forces in North Africa, ending the North African Campaign. The Allies launched an invasion of Sicily in July 1943, capturing the island the following month. The Allied invasion of mainland Italy commenced in September 1943, but the Italian Campaign continued until 1945.

To command the invasion of France, Roosevelt chose General Dwight D. Eisenhower, who had successfully commanded a multinational coalition in North Africa and Sicily. Eisenhower launched Operation Overlord on June 6, 1944. Supported by 12,000 aircraft and the largest naval force ever assembled, the Allies successfully established a beachhead in Normandy and advanced into France. Though reluctant to back an unelected government, Roosevelt recognized Charles de Gaulle's Provisional Government of the French Republic in July 1944. Over the following months, the Allies liberated more territory and began the invasion of Germany. By April 1945, Nazi resistance was crumbling.

The Japanese advance reached its maximum extent by June 1942, when the US Navy scored a decisive victory at the Battle of Midway. American and Australian forces then began a slow and costly strategy of leapfrogging through the Pacific Islands, with the objective of gaining bases from which Japan could ultimately be invaded. Roosevelt gave way in part to insistent demands from the public and Congress that more effort be devoted against Japan, but he always insisted on Germany first. The strength of the Imperial Japanese Navy was decimated in the Battle of Leyte Gulf, and by April 1945 the Allies had re-captured much of their lost territory in the Pacific.

==== Home front ====
The home front was subject to dynamic social changes throughout the war, though domestic issues were no longer Roosevelt's most urgent policy concern. The military buildup spurred economic growth. Unemployment fell from 7.7 million in spring 1940 to 3.4 million in fall 1941 and to 1.5 million in fall 1942, out of a labor force of 54 million. (Note: WPA workers were counted as unemployed by this set of statistics.) There was a growing labor shortage, accelerating the second wave of the Great Migration of African Americans and rural populations to manufacturing centers. To pay for increased government spending, the Revenue Act of 1942 instituted top tax rates as high as 94% (after accounting for the excess profits tax), greatly increased the tax base, and instituted the first federal withholding tax. In 1944, Roosevelt requested that Congress enact legislation to tax all "unreasonable" profits, both corporate and individual. Congress overrode Roosevelt's veto to pass a smaller revenue bill raising $2 billion. The country's GDP doubled during the war, but national debt increased by 500%.

In 1942, war production increased dramatically but fell short of Roosevelt's goals, due in part to manpower shortages. The effort was also hindered by strikes, especially in the coal mining and railroad industries, which lasted well into 1944. Nonetheless, between 1941 and 1945, the US produced 2.4 million trucks, 300,000 military aircraft, 88,400 tanks, and 40 billion rounds of ammunition. The production capacity of the US dwarfed that of other countries; for example, in 1944, the US produced more military aircraft than the combined production of Germany, Japan, Britain, and the Soviet Union. The White House became the ultimate site for labor mediation, conciliation or arbitration. One particular conflict occurred between Vice President Wallace, who headed the Board of Economic Warfare, and Jesse H. Jones, in charge of the Reconstruction Finance Corporation; both agencies assumed responsibility for the acquisition of rubber supplies and came to loggerheads over funding. Roosevelt resolved the dispute by dissolving both agencies. In 1943, Roosevelt established the Office of War Mobilization to oversee the home front; the agency was led by James F. Byrnes, who came to be known as the "assistant president" due to his influence.

Roosevelt announced the plan for a bill of social and economic rights in the State of the Union address broadcast on January 11, 1944 (excerpt).

Roosevelt's 1944 State of the Union Address advocated a Second Bill of Rights, guaranteeing "adequate medical care", "a good education", "a decent home", and a "useful and remunerative job". In the most ambitious domestic proposal of his third term, Roosevelt proposed the G.I. Bill, which would create a massive benefits program for returning soldiers, including post-secondary education, medical care, unemployment insurance, job counseling, and low-cost loans for homes and businesses. The G.I. Bill passed unanimously in Congress and was signed into law in June 1944. Of the fifteen million Americans who served in World War II, more than half benefitted from the educational opportunities provided for in the G.I. Bill.

=== Fourth term (1945) ===
==== Election of 1944 ====
1944 electoral vote results

The president faced little difficulty in securing re-nomination at the 1944 Democratic National Convention: on the lone presidential ballot, he won the vast majority of delegates. Party leaders persuaded Roosevelt to drop Vice President Wallace from the ticket, believing him to be an electoral liability and a poor potential successor in case of Roosevelt's death. Roosevelt preferred Byrnes as Wallace's replacement but was convinced to support Senator Harry S. Truman of Missouri.

The Republicans nominated Thomas E. Dewey. They accused Roosevelt of domestic corruption and bureaucratic inefficiency, but Dewey's most effective tactic was to assail the President as a "tired old man". However, during the campaign Roosevelt displayed enough vigor to undermine this description. Labor unions, which had grown rapidly in the war, fully supported Roosevelt. He and Truman won the 1944 election with 53.4% of the popular vote and 432 out of the 531 electoral votes. The president campaigned in favor of a strong United Nations, so his victory symbolized support for the nation's future participation in the international community.

==== Nuclear weapons ====
The Manhattan Project started as early as August 1939, when Leo Szilard and Albert Einstein sent the Einstein–Szilárd letter to Roosevelt, warning of the possibility of a German nuclear weapon project. Roosevelt feared the consequences of allowing Germany to have sole possession of the technology and authorized preliminary research into nuclear weapons. (Note: The Germans stopped research on nuclear weapons in 1942, choosing to focus on other projects. Japan gave up its own program in 1943.) The rapid capitulation of Germany weeks after the death of Roosevelt did not require the evaluation of the use of nuclear weapons in Germany. Roosevelt told Truman nothing about the Manhattan Project; Truman was informed only after taking the presidential office. Within months of Roosevelt's death, atomic bombs were dropped on Hiroshima and Nagasaki, and soon after Japan capitulated, ending the war with unconditional surrender. According to Alan Brinkley, "there is little evidence to suggest how [Roosevelt] would have used the new weapon had he lived".

== Severe health decline and death ==
Roosevelt, a chain-smoker, had been in declining health since at least 1940. In March 1944, he underwent testing at Bethesda Hospital and was found to have hypertension, atherosclerosis, coronary artery disease causing angina pectoris, and congestive heart failure. Physicians ordered Roosevelt to rest. His personal physician, Admiral Ross T. McIntire, created a daily schedule that incorporated two hours of rest and banned business guests for lunch; still, during the 1944 re-election campaign, McIntire denied several times that Roosevelt's health was poor. Roosevelt realized that his declining health could eventually make it impossible for him to continue as president, and in 1945 he told a confidant that he might resign following the end of the war.

Everyone who saw Roosevelt was reportedly shocked by how old and frail he looked upon his return to the US from the Yalta Conference. He spoke while seated in his address to Congress, an unprecedented concession to his physical incapacity. On March 29, Roosevelt departed for the Little White House in Warm Springs, Georgia, to rest before his anticipated appearance at the founding conference of the United Nations. On April 12, at the Little White House, he sat for a portrait by painter Elizabeth Shoumatoff. He told Shoumatoff, "I have a terrific headache." He then slumped forward in his chair, unconscious, and was carried into his bedroom. At 3:35 p.m. that day, his doctor Howard Bruenn diagnosed a massive intracerebral hemorrhage and pronounced him dead at age 63.

=== Funeral and burial ===
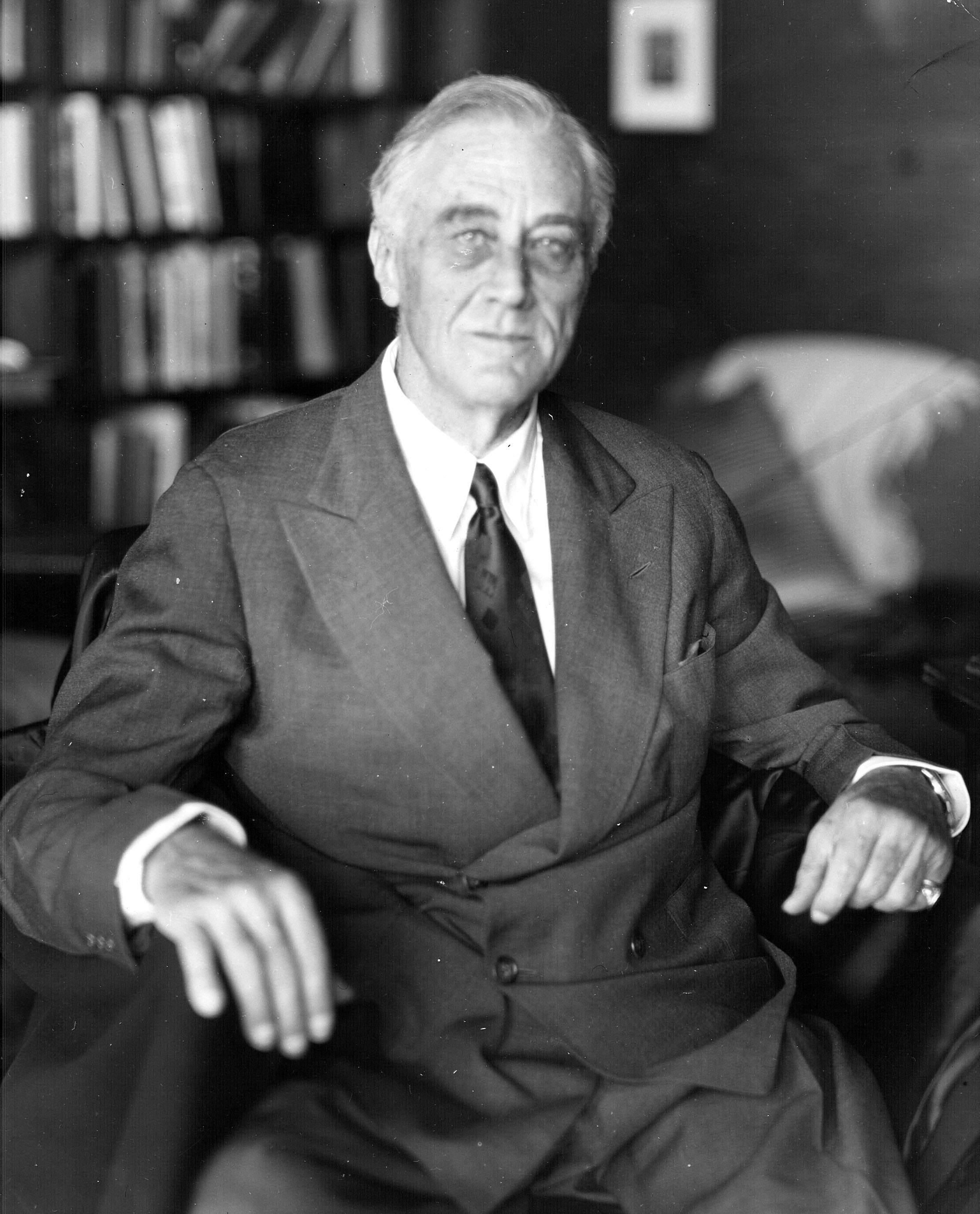
Last photograph of Roosevelt on April 11, 1945, one day before his death

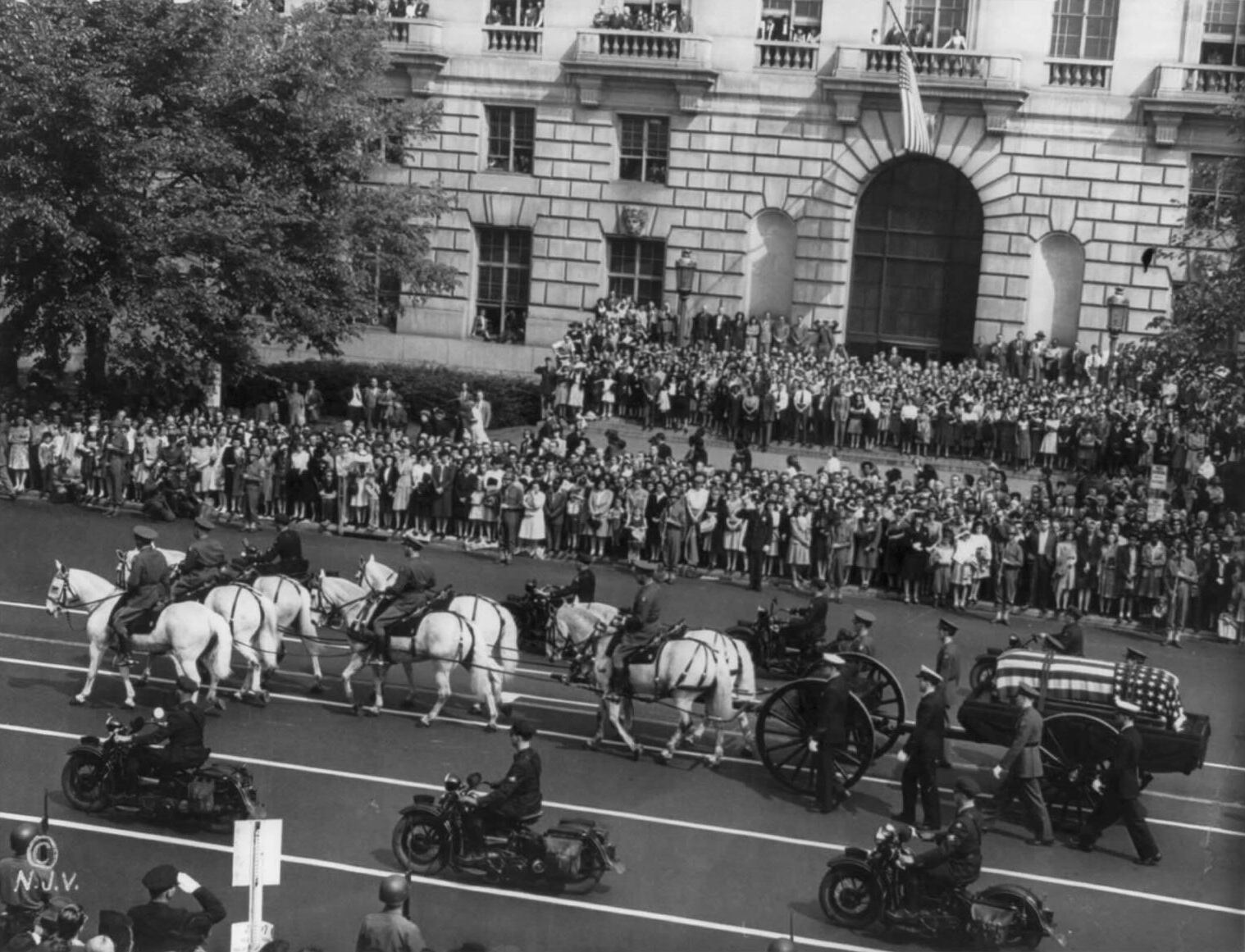
Roosevelt's funeral cortège in Washington, D.C., watched by 300,000 spectators, April 14, 1945

On April 13, Roosevelt's body was placed in a flag-draped coffin and loaded onto the Ferdinand Magellan presidential railcar for the trip back to Washington. A state funeral was deemed inappropriate during wartime, so a smaller ceremony was undertaken. Despite this, thousands flocked to the route to pay their respects. Rather than lying in state at the Capitol as is tradition, Roosevelt's remains were placed in the White House's East Room, where a simple funeral service was held on April 14. His body was then transported by train transfers from Washington to his birthplace of Hyde Park, New York. On April 15, per his wishes, he was buried in the rose garden of his Springwood estate.

Roosevelt's death was met with shock and grief across the world. Germany surrendered during the 30-day mourning period, but Truman as Roosevelt's successor ordered flags to remain at half-staff, in addition to dedicating Victory in Europe Day and its celebrations to Roosevelt's memory. World War II ended with the surrender of Japan in September.

Roosevelt's declining physical health and use of a wheelchair had been kept secret from the public. Although he was allowed to work only four hours a day, the illusion of activity was kept up. Robert Ferrell's 1998 book The Dying President explores the extent to which Roosevelt and his top aides went to keep the public in the dark about his decline. Ferrell argues that Roosevelt was too sick to have remained in office, and that his inability to work led to critical foreign policy mistakes in 1944 and 1945, as well as a failure to prepare Truman for succeeding him.

== Philosophy and views ==
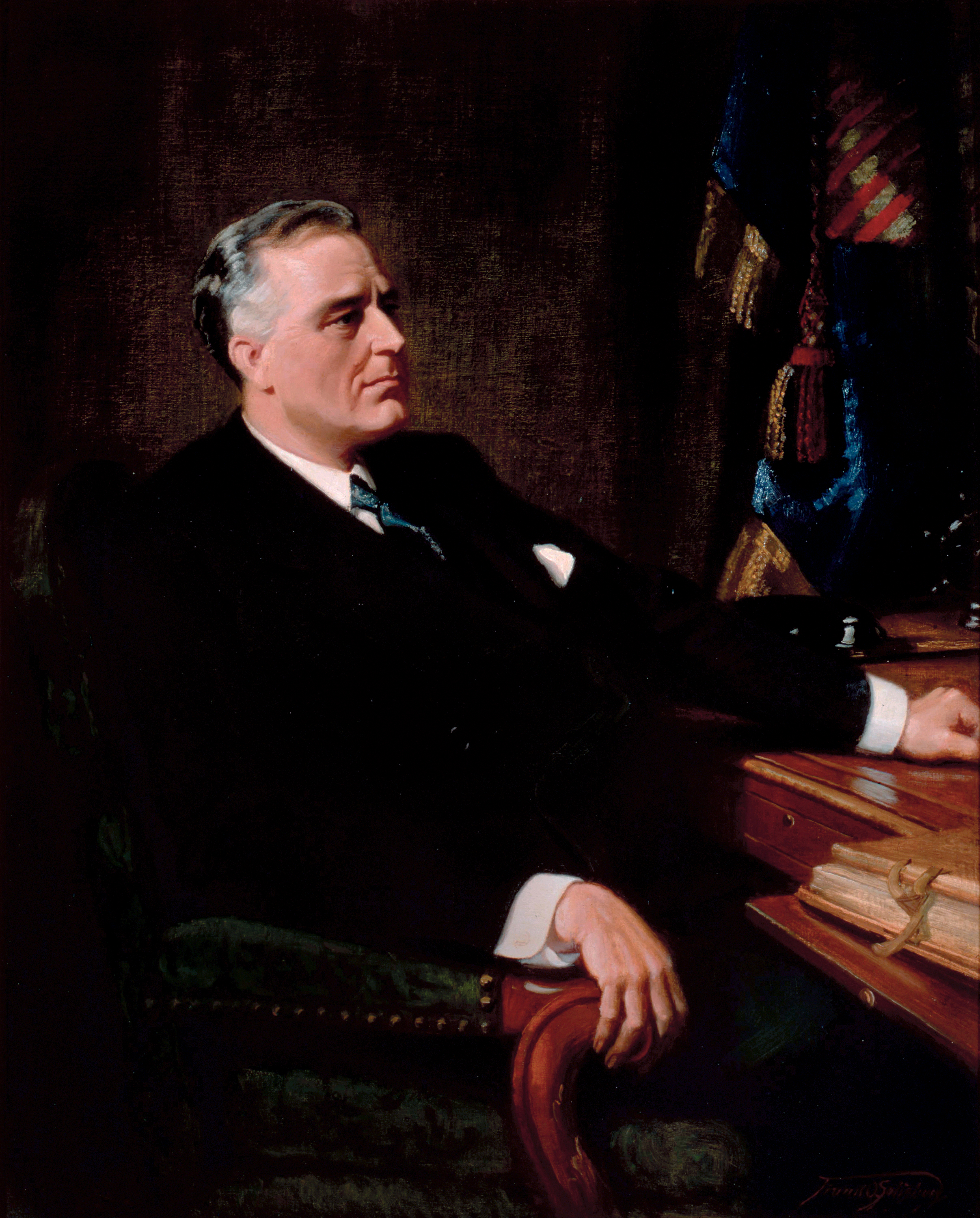
Official White House portrait of President Roosevelt by Frank O. Salisbury, c. 1947, is a copy by Salisbury of the original portrait painted in 1935.

=== Economic philosophy ===
From 1933 onward, Roosevelt argued that emergency spending programs were temporary, and he endorsed the deficit spending proposed by economists such as John Maynard Keynes. In mid-1935, Roosevelt began to prioritize a major reform of the tax code. He sought higher taxes on top incomes, a higher estate tax, a graduated corporate tax, and the implementation of a tax on intercorporate dividends. In response, Congress passed the Revenue Act of 1935, which raised relatively little revenue but increased taxes on the highest earners. A top tax rate of 79% was set for income above $5 million; in 1935, just one individual, John D. Rockefeller, paid that rate. In early 1936, following the passage of the Bonus Act, Roosevelt again sought to increase taxes on corporate profits. Congress passed a bill that raised less revenue than Roosevelt's proposals, but imposed an undistributed profits tax on corporate earnings.

In 1936, Roosevelt appointed the Brownlow Committee to recommend changes to the administration and financing of the executive branch. The Brownlow Committee warned that government agencies had grown increasingly powerful and independent, and proposed a plan to consolidate over 100 agencies into 12 departments and allow the president to appoint several assistants. Congress passed the Reorganization Act of 1939 based on the Brownlow Committee's recommendations. Roosevelt then established the Executive Office of the President, which increased the president's control over the executive branch. Roosevelt combined several government public works and welfare agencies into the Federal Works Agency and the Federal Security Agency. He also transferred the powerful Bureau of the Budget from the Treasury Department to the Executive Office of the President. The new law also authorized the establishment of the Office of Emergency Management, which enabled the immediate creation of numerous wartime agencies. The reorganization is best known for allowing the President to appoint numerous assistants and advisers. Those who built a network of support in Congress became virtually independent "czars" in their specialized domains.

=== Geopolitical philosophy ===
In late December 1941 Churchill and Roosevelt met at the Arcadia Conference, which established a joint strategy between the US and Britain. Both agreed on a Europe first strategy that would prioritize the defeat of Germany before Japan. Roosevelt coined the term "Four Policemen" to refer to the "Big Four" Allied powers of World War II: the United States, the United Kingdom, the Soviet Union, and China. Roosevelt, Churchill, Soviet leader Joseph Stalin, and Chinese Generalissimo Chiang Kai-shek cooperated informally on a plan in which American and British troops concentrated in the West, Soviet troops fought on the Eastern front, and Chinese, British, and American troops fought in Asia and the Pacific. Roosevelt had a close relationship with Churchill, but he and his advisers quickly lost respect for Chiang's government, viewing it as hopelessly corrupt. US and Soviet leaders distrusted each other throughout the war, and relations further suffered after 1943 as both sides supported sympathetic governments in liberated territories.

To coordinate war production and other aspects of the home front, Roosevelt established the War Shipping Administration, the Office of Price Administration, the Board of Economic Warfare, and the War Labor Board. In 1943, Roosevelt established the Office of War Mobilization (OWM) to oversee war production.

In August 1939, Roosevelt had aligned his geopolitics with the imminent reality of developing nuclear arms as weapons of mass destruction. Roosevelt authorized the research and development of such destructive military capabilities. (Note: The Germans stopped research on nuclear weapons in 1942, deciding it was too hard to make a bomb. Japan gave up its own small program in 1943.) The Manhattan Project was soon instituted with British cooperation, leading to the eventual decades-long arms race with the Soviet Union.

=== Racial views and civil rights ===
Roosevelt won strong support from Chinese Americans and Filipino Americans, but not Japanese Americans, as he presided over their internment during the war. African Americans and Native Americans fared well in two New Deal relief programs, the Civilian Conservation Corps and the Indian Reorganization Act, respectively. From his first term until 1939, the Mexican Repatriation started by President Herbert Hoover continued under Roosevelt, which scholars today contend was a form of ethnic cleansing towards Mexican Americans. Roosevelt ended federal involvement in the deportations. After 1934, deportations fell by approximately 50 percent. However, Roosevelt did not attempt to suppress the deportations on a local or state level. Mexican Americans were the only group explicitly excluded from New Deal benefits. The deprivation of due process for Mexican Americans was a precedent for Roosevelt's internment of Japanese Americans during World War II. David T. Beito argues Roosevelt could possibly have significantly reduced anti-Japanese sentiment by leveraging his charisma and even invoking his own Four Freedoms vision.

In contrast to Presidents Harding and Coolidge, Roosevelt stopped short of joining NAACP leaders in pushing for federal anti-lynching legislation. He asserted that such legislation was unlikely to pass and that his support for it would alienate Southern congressmen, though by 1940 even his conservative Texan vice-president, Garner, supported federal action against lynching. Roosevelt did not appoint or nominate a single African American as secretary or assistant secretary to his cabinet. About one hundred African Americans met informally, however, to provide the administration with advice on issues related to African Americans. Although sometimes described as a "Black Cabinet", Roosevelt never officially acknowledged it as such nor did he make "appointments" to it. Although African American sprinter Jesse Owens had won four gold medals for the US in the 1936 Olympic Games, Roosevelt never congratulated Owens or invited him to the White House.

First Lady Eleanor Roosevelt vocally supported efforts designed to aid the African American community, including the Fair Labor Standards Act, which helped boost wages for nonwhite workers in the South. In 1941, Roosevelt established the Fair Employment Practices Committee (FEPC) to implement Executive Order 8802, which prohibited racial and religious discrimination in employment among defense contractors. The FEPC was the first national program directed against employment discrimination, and it played a major role in opening up new employment opportunities to nonwhite workers. During World War II, the proportion of African American men employed in manufacturing positions rose significantly. In response to Roosevelt's policies, African Americans increasingly defected from the Republican Party during the 1930s and 1940s, becoming an important Democratic voting bloc in several Northern states.

Following the attack on Pearl Harbor, concerns about the possibility of sabotage by Japanese Americans were fed by long-standing racism against Japanese immigrants and the findings of the Roberts Commission, which concluded that the attack on Pearl Harbor had been assisted by Japanese spies. On February 19, 1942, Roosevelt signed Executive Order 9066, which relocated 110,000 Japanese-American citizens and immigrants, most of whom lived on the Pacific Coast. They were forced to liquidate their properties and businesses and interned in hastily built camps in interior, remote locations. Roosevelt delegated the decision for internment to Secretary of War Stimson, who in turn relied on the judgment of Assistant Secretary of War John J. McCloy. The Supreme Court upheld the constitutionality of the executive order in the 1944 case of Korematsu v. United States. A much smaller number of German and Italian citizens were arrested or placed into internment camps, but not on the sole basis of racial ancestry. After Pearl Harbor, Eleanor Roosevelt spoke out against Japanese-American prejudice, warning against the "great hysteria against minority groups." She also privately opposed her husband's Executive Order 9066. She was widely criticized for her defense of Japanese-American citizens, including a call by the Los Angeles Times that she be "forced to retire from public life" over her stand on the issue.

=== Religious views and ethics ===
==== Religious views ====
Near the Springwood estate in Hyde Park is the St. James Episcopal Church, where from a young age Roosevelt attended services with his family. Roosevelt grew to be an active member of the church.

In his first inaugural address, in 1933, Roosevelt declared that "the only thing we have to fear is fear itself" and made numerous religious references, which were widely commented upon at the time. Although Roosevelt did not use the term "Judeo-Christian", it has come to be seen by scholars as in tune with the emerging view of a Judeo-Christian tradition. Historian Mary Stuckey emphasizes "Roosevelt's use of the shared values grounded in the Judeo-Christian tradition" as a way to unify the nation, and justify his own role as its chief policymaker. In the speech, Roosevelt criticized the bankers and promised a reform in an echo of the gospels: "The money changers have fled from their high seats in the temple of our civilization. We may now restore that temple to the ancient truths. The measure of the restoration lies in the extent to which we apply social values more noble than mere monetary profit." Houck and Nocasian, examining the flood of responses to the First Inaugural, and commenting on this passage, argue: "For those inclined to see the Divine Hand of Providence at work, Roosevelt's miraculous escape [from assassination] in Miami was a sign—perhaps The Sign—that God had sent another Washington or Lincoln at the appointed hour. ... Many others could not resist the subject position that Roosevelt ... had cultivated throughout the address—that of savior."

Gary Scott Smith stresses that Roosevelt believed his welfare programs were "wholly in accord with the social teachings of Christianity". He saw the achievement of social justice through government action as morally superior to the old laissez-faire approach. He proclaimed, "The thing we are seeking is justice," as guided by the precept of "Do unto your neighbor as you would be done by." Roosevelt saw the moral issue as religiosity versus anti-religion. According to Smith, "He pleaded with Protestants, Catholics, and Jews to transcend their sectarian creeds and 'unite in good works' whenever they could 'find common cause.'"

Atalia Omer and Jason A. Springs point to Roosevelt's 1939 State of the Union Address, which called upon Americans to "defend, not their homes alone, but the tenets of faith and humanity on with which their churches, their governments and their very civilization are founded". They state that, "This familiar rhetoric invoked a conception of the sanctity of the United States' Judeo-Christian values as a basis for war." Timothy Wyatt notes that in the coming of World War II Roosevelt's isolationist opponents said he was calling for a "holy war". Wyatt says: "Often in his Fireside Chats or speeches to the houses of Congress, Roosevelt argued for the entrance of America into the war by using both blatant and subtle religious rhetoric. Roosevelt portrayed the conflict in the light of good versus evil, the religious against the irreligious. In doing so, he pitted the Christian ideals of democracy against the atheism of National Socialism.

==== Judeo-Christian ethics ====
There is controversy among historians about Roosevelt's attitude to Jews and the Holocaust. Arthur M. Schlesinger Jr. says Roosevelt "did what he could do" to help Jews. David Wyman says Roosevelt's record on Jewish refugees was one of the worst failures of his presidency. In 1923, as a member of the Harvard University board of directors, Roosevelt decided there were too many Jewish students at Harvard and helped institute a quota to limit the number of Jews admitted. After Kristallnacht in 1938, Roosevelt had his ambassador to Germany recalled to Washington. He did not loosen immigration quotas but did allow German Jews already in the US on visas to stay indefinitely. According to Rafael Medoff, Roosevelt could have saved 190,000 Jewish lives by telling his State Department to fill immigration quotas to the legal limit, but his presidency discouraged and disqualified Jewish refugees based on its prohibitive requirements that left less than 25 percent of the quotas filled. In 1939, Roosevelt refused to allow the MS St. Louis, a ship carrying more than 900 Jews fleeing the Nazis, to enter the United States, and it was forced to return to Europe.

Nazi leaders chose to implement the "Final Solution"—the extermination of the European Jewish population—by January 1942, and American officials learned of the scale of the Nazi extermination campaign in the following months. Against the objections of the State Department, Roosevelt convinced the other Allied leaders to issue the Joint Declaration by Members of the United Nations, which condemned The Holocaust that was ongoing. In 1943, Roosevelt told US government officials that there should be limits on Jews in various professions to "eliminate the specific and understandable complaints which the Germans bore towards the Jews in Germany." The same year, Roosevelt was personally briefed by Polish Home Army intelligence agent Jan Karski who was an eyewitness of the Holocaust. Pleading for action, Karski told him that 1.8 million Jews had already been exterminated. In January 1944, Roosevelt established the War Refugee Board to aid Jews and other victims of Axis atrocities. Aside from these actions, Roosevelt believed that the best way to help the persecuted populations of Europe was to end the war as quickly as possible. Top military leaders and War Department leaders rejected any campaign to bomb the extermination camps or the rail lines leading to them, fearing it would be a diversion from the war effort. According to biographer Jean Edward Smith, there is no evidence that anyone ever proposed such a campaign to Roosevelt.

== Legacy ==
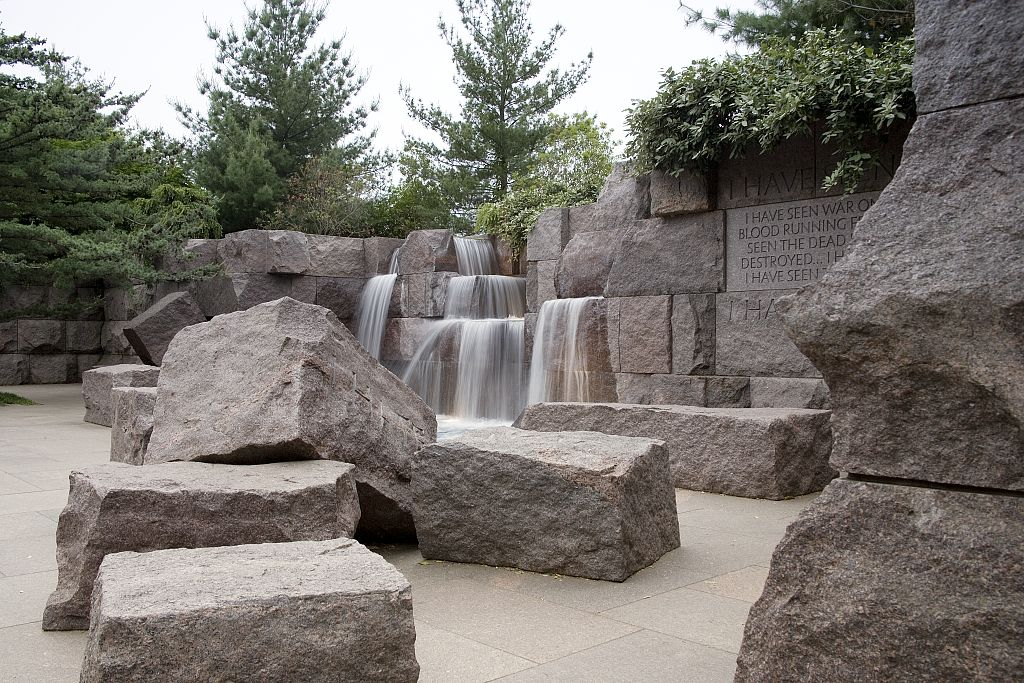
The Franklin Delano Roosevelt Memorial in Washington, D.C.

=== Historical reception ===
Roosevelt is considered one of the most important figures in US history, and one of the most influential figures of the 20th century. Historians and political scientists consistently rank him, George Washington, and Abraham Lincoln as the three greatest presidents, although the order varies. He was the only president thrice named Time Person of the Year, in 1932, 1934 and 1941.

Reflecting on Roosevelt's presidency, "which brought the United States through the Great Depression and World War II to a prosperous future", biographer Jean Edward Smith said in 2007, "He lifted himself from a wheelchair to lift the nation from its knees." His commitment to the working class and unemployed in need of relief in the nation's longest recession made him a favorite of blue-collar workers, labor unions, and ethnic minorities. The rapid expansion of government programs during Roosevelt's term redefined the role of government in the US, and Roosevelt's advocacy for government social programs was instrumental in redefining liberalism for coming generations. Roosevelt firmly established US leadership on the world stage with his role in shaping and financing World War II. He also permanently increased the power of the president at the expense of Congress. In the final section of her book on leadership during adversity, Doris Kearns Goodwin explains that presidential leadership skills were amply demonstrated in Roosevelt's signing of New Deal projects, including the Civilian Conservation Corps, projects for the Works Progress Administration, and the introduction of businesses through the Securities and Exchange Commission

His Second Bill of Rights became, according to historian Joshua Zeitz, "the basis of the Democratic Party's aspirations for the better part of four decades". After his death, Eleanor continued to be a forceful presence in US and world politics, serving as delegate to the conference which established the United Nations and championing civil rights and liberalism generally. Some junior New Dealers played leading roles in the presidencies of Truman, John F. Kennedy, and Lyndon B. Johnson. Historian William Leuchtenburg says that, as president, "Kennedy never wholly embraced the Roosevelt tradition and at times he deliberately severed himself from it." Other members of Kennedy's cabinet such as Arthur M. Schlesinger Jr. wrote books in honor of Roosevelt such as The Vital Center (1949), which made a case for the New Deal policies of Roosevelt. Young Lyndon Johnson had been an enthusiastic New Dealer and a favorite of Roosevelt; Johnson later modelled his presidency on Roosevelt's.

During his presidency, and to a lesser extent posthumously, there has been much criticism of Roosevelt. Critics have questioned not only his policies, positions, and consolidation of power but also his breaking with tradition by running for a third term as president. Long after his death, new lines of attack criticized Roosevelt's policies regarding helping the Jews of Europe, incarcerating the Japanese on the West Coast, infringements on free speech and privacy, and opposing anti-lynching legislation. Roosevelt was criticized by conservatives for his economic policies, especially the shift in tone from individualism to collectivism with the expansion of the welfare state and regulation of the economy. Those criticisms continued decades after his death. One factor in the revisiting of these issues was the election of Ronald Reagan in 1980, who selectively opposed various supporters of the New Deal. Roosevelt's issuance of Executive Order 6102, which mandated the largest gold confiscation in American history, remains controversial to gold investors.

=== Memorials and commemorations ===
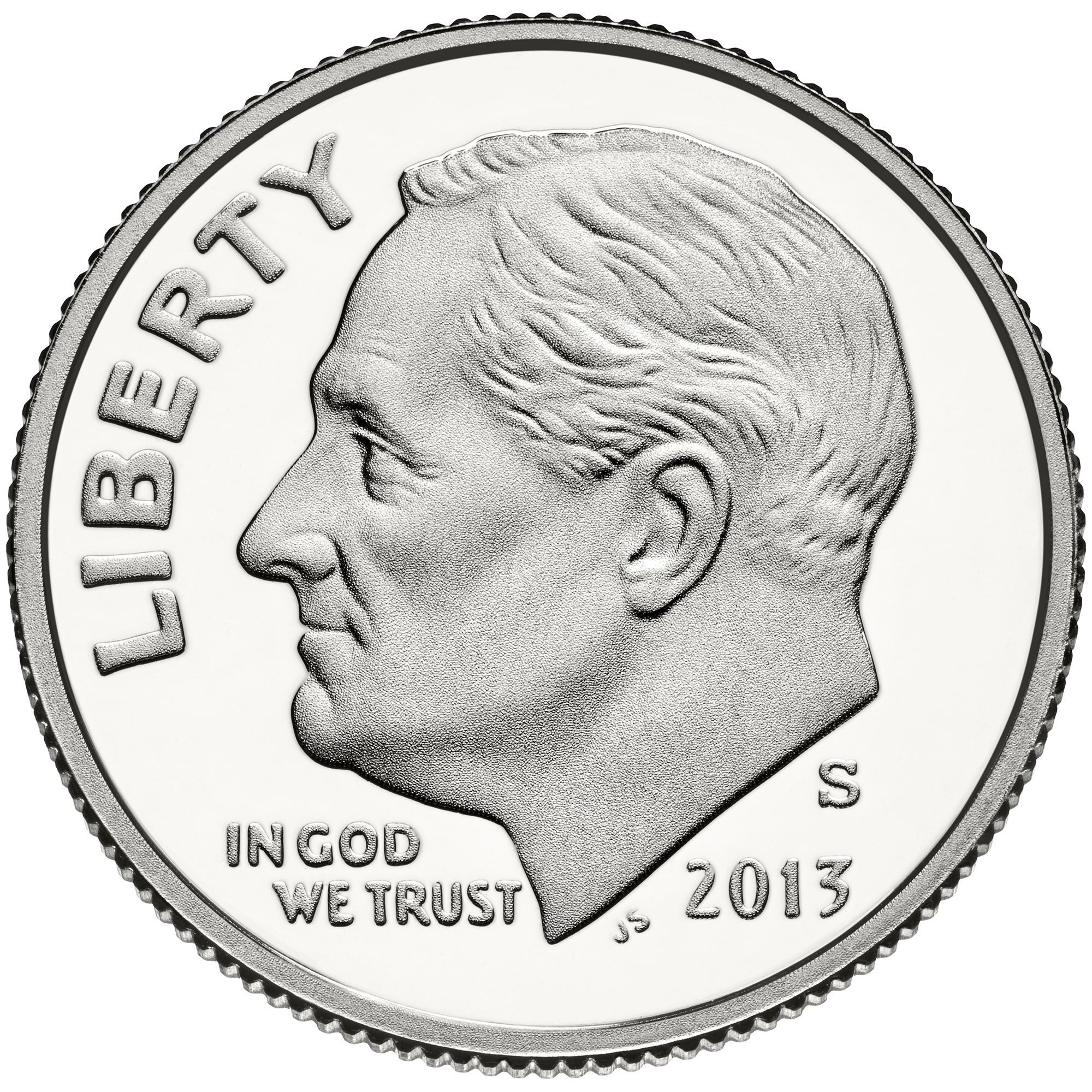
The Roosevelt dime has been struck since 1946.

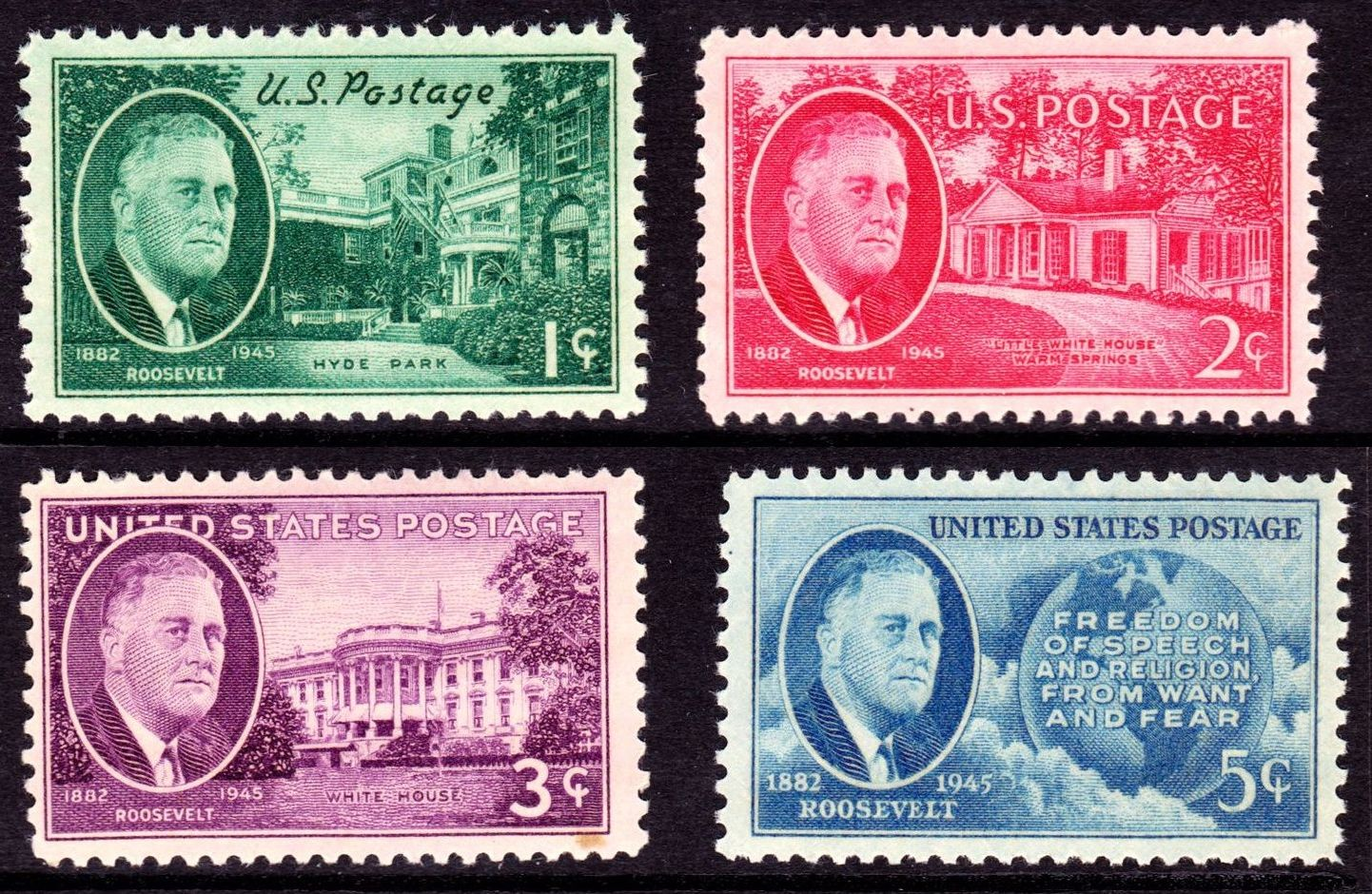
Set of four stamps honoring FDR, issued only two months after his death in 1945

Roosevelt's home in Hyde Park is a National Historic Site and home to his Presidential library. Washington, D.C., hosts two memorials: the 7 1/2-acre (3-hectare) Roosevelt Memorial on the Tidal Basin, and a more modest memorial, a block of marble in front of the National Archives building suggested by Roosevelt himself, erected in 1965. Roosevelt's leadership in the March of Dimes is one reason he has been commemorated on the American dime coin since 1946. Roosevelt has also appeared on several US postage stamps. The carrier USS Franklin D. Roosevelt, launched shortly after his death, served from 1945 to 1977.

On the Paris Metro, the Franklin D. Roosevelt station was renamed after him in 1946. London's Westminster Abbey also has a memorial to Roosevelt that was unveiled by Clement Attlee and Churchill in 1948. Welfare Island in New York was renamed after Roosevelt in 1973. Louis Kahn was asked to design Franklin D. Roosevelt Four Freedoms Park, which includes an oversized bronze bust commemorating Roosevelt. Ai Weiwei designed a conceptual pavilion to honor the Four Freedoms memorial site to Roosevelt in 2025.

Roosevelt's life is depicted in the 1976 television miniseries Eleanor and Franklin and in the 2014 documentary miniseries The Roosevelts by Ken Burns. His struggle with illness is featured in the 1958 Tony Award-winning play Sunrise at Campobello, in the 1960 film of the same name, which won a Golden Globe and was nominated for an Academy Award, and in the 2005 film Warm Springs, starring Kenneth Branagh. Hyde Park on Hudson is a 2012 historical drama film which reconstructs his close relations with Margaret "Daisy" Suckley. FDR was a 2023 miniseries which chronicled the life of Roosevelt.

== See also ==
- August Adolph Gennerich – Roosevelt's bodyguard
- Cultural depictions of Franklin D. Roosevelt
- Sunshine Special – Roosevelt's limousine

== Notes ==
New York State Senate
Preceded by John F. Schlosser	Member of the New York Senate from the 26th district 1911–1913	Succeeded by James E. Towner
Political offices
Preceded by Beekman Winthrop	Assistant Secretary of the Navy; 1913–1920	Succeeded by Gordon Woodbury
Preceded by Al Smith	Governor of New York; 1929–1932	Succeeded by Herbert H. Lehman
Preceded by Herbert Hoover	President of the United States; 1933–1945	Succeeded by Harry S. Truman
Party political offices
Preceded by Thomas R. Marshall	Democratic nominee for Vice President of the United States; 1920	Succeeded by Charles W. Bryan
Preceded by Al Smith	Democratic nominee for Governor of New York; 1928, 1930	Succeeded by Herbert H. Lehman
Preceded by Al Smith	Democratic nominee for President of the United States; 1932, 1936, 1940, 1944	Succeeded by Harry S. Truman
