= Timeline of the Herbert Hoover presidency =

The presidency of Herbert Hoover began on March 4, 1929, when Herbert Hoover was inaugurated as the 31st president of the United States, and ended on March 4, 1933.

== 1929 ==
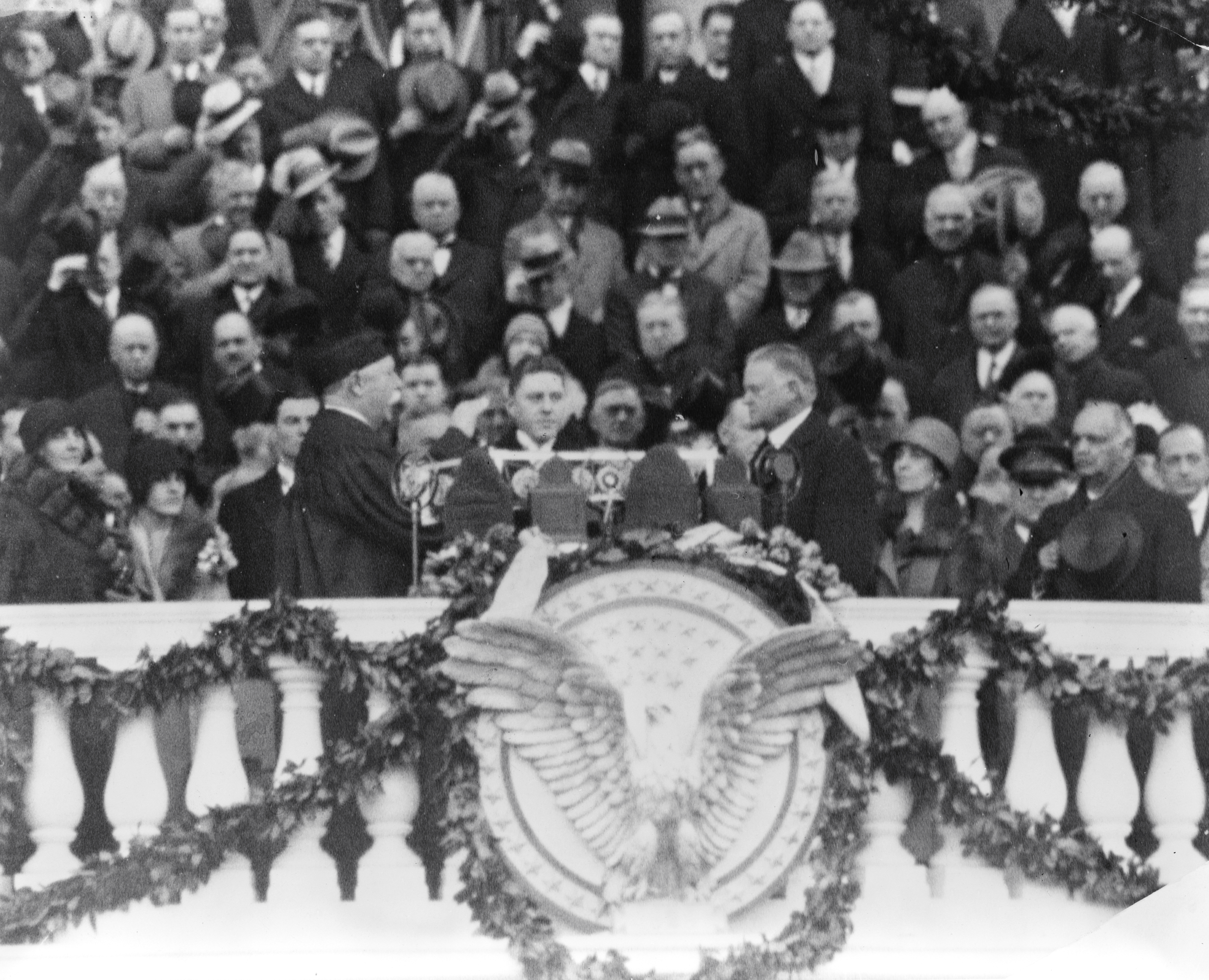
Hoover is inaugurated. March 4, 1929.

=== March 1929 ===
- March 4 – The inauguration of Herbert Hoover takes place. He identifies crime as his primary concern as president.
- March 5 – Hoover determines that the embargo on arms shipments to Mexico should not be adjusted.
- March 6 – Herbert Lord is retained by Hoover as Director of the Bureau of the Budget.
- March 12 – Hoover declares a policy of conserving oil fields in all cases permitted by law.
- March 25 – Hoover abolishes the White House stables.
- March 26 – Hoover demands an end to the abuse of patronage by Republicans in Southern states.
- March 27 – Hoover has a telephone installed at his desk.
- March 28 – Henry L. Stimson takes office as Hoover's Secretary of State, replacing Frank B. Kellogg.

=== April 1929 ===
- April 4 – Lou Henry Hoover becomes the first woman to operate an automobile as First Lady.
- April 6 – Hoover travels to Shenandoah National Park to consider it as a presidential campsite.
- April 10 – It is determined that the sister of Vice President Charles Curtis may hold a diplomatic status equivalent of Second Lady of the United States.
- April 14 – Hoover speaks at the Gridiron Club dinner.
- April 15 – Congress meets in a special session convened by Hoover.
- April 16 – Hoover delivers a message to Congress requesting the creation of a federal farm board.
- April 17 – Hoover pitches the first ball of the 1929 Major League Baseball season.
- April 21 – Hoover declares opposition to a debenture plan on exports in the pending farm bill.
- April 22 – Hoover asks reporters to support law enforcement in an address during the annual Associated Press luncheon.
- April 25 – The American Association of Engineering Societies awards Hoover the John Fritz Medal.
- April 26 – Hoover endorses a plan to reconstruct Washington, D.C. during a meeting at the Chamber of Commerce.
- April 30 – Hoover signs an appropriations bill as the first bill of his presidency.

=== May 1929 ===
- May 2 – Hoover hosts a luncheon with 47 business leaders.
- May 2 – Hoover fires United States Attorney William A De Groot after he refuses to resign.
- May 8 – Hoover meets with Goodyear president Paul W. Litchfield to discuss the development of dirigible mail carriers.
- May 11 – Hoover designates the Mount of the Holy Cross as a national monument.
- May 12 – Hoover invites Senators William Borah and Simeon D. Fess to the White House to negotiate a compromise on the farm bill.
- May 14 – Hoover raises tariffs on flaxseed, milk, cream, and window glass.
- May 18 – Hoover announces that American facilitation of the territorial dispute between Chile and Peru have been successful.
- May 20 – The United States endorses a plan to be more lenient in collection of German war reparations.
- May 20 – Hoover establishes the Wickersham Commission to investigate the status of Prohibition in the United States.
- May 27 – The Supreme Court rules that the president has the power of pocket veto in the Pocket Veto Case.
- May 28 – The Wickersham Commission has its first meeting at the White House.
- May 30 – Hoover urges acceptance of the Kellogg–Briand Pact while giving a Memorial Day speech at Arlington National Cemetery.

=== June 1929 ===
- June 3 – The Treaty of Lima is signed by Chile and Peru following negotiations hosted by the United States.
- June 11 – Hoover urges the Senate to vote in favor of the Agricultural Marketing Act of 1929.
- June 12 – First Lady Lou Henry Hoover hosts Jessie De Priest for tea at the White House.
- June 15 – Hoover signs the Agricultural Marketing Act of 1929 into law.
- June 21 – U.S. Ambassador to Mexico Dwight Morrow arbitrates the end of the Cristero War.
- June 25 – Hoover signs the Boulder Canyon Project Act into law, funding the Boulder Dam.

=== July 1929 ===
- July 8 – Hoover appoints Dwight F. Davis as Governor-General of the Philippines.
- July 15 – Hoover presides over the first Federal Farm Board meeting.
- July 27 – Hoover forwards a statement to the White House, expressing appreciation for the debt funding agreement in the French debt settlement.
- July 28 – Hoover returns to Washington, D.C.
- July 29 – Hoover addresses the first meeting of a conference on child health and protection planning committee.

=== August 1929 ===
- August 10 – Hoover hosts high-profile guests at Rapidan Camp to celebrate his 55th birthday.
- August 27 – The United States signs the Kellogg–Briand Pact.

=== September 1929 ===
- September 18 – Hoover expresses support for arms reduction during a radio broadcast.

=== October 1929 ===
- October 4–5 – Ramsay MacDonald meets with Hoover to discuss arms reduction.
- October 21 – Hoover dedicates the Edison Institute of Technology.
- October 24 – The Wall Street Crash of 1929 begins.
- October 25 – Hoover assures the American people that the economy is still strong.
- October 29 – The Wall Street Crash continues as "Black Tuesday" occurs.

=== November 1929 ===
- November 18 – Incumbent Secretary of War James William Good dies at the age of 63.
- November 21 – Hoover holds a conference with business and labor leaders.
- November 23 – Hoover requests that state governors increase public works projects in their states.

=== December 1929 ===
- December 2 – Hoover demands an end to the Sino-Soviet conflict.
- December 3 – Hoover delivers the 1929 State of the Union Address and declares his belief that the worst of the Great Depression is over.
- December 6 – U.S. Marines fire on Haitian protesters during the United States occupation of Haiti.
- December 9 – Patrick J. Hurley takes office as Secretary of War.
- December 14 – Hoover orders the release of Communist Party members that had been arrested for congregating without a permit.
- December 24 – The West Wing of the White House is damaged in a fire. Hoover returns to the White House to oversee the salvaging of important documents.

== 1930 ==
=== February 1930 ===
- February 3 – Hoover nominates Charles Evans Hughes as Chief Justice of the United States.
- February 28 – The Forbes Commission arrives in Haiti to develop a strategy to end the occupation of the country.

=== March 1930 ===
- March 7 – Hoover states his belief that the Great Depression is nearing its end.
- March 8 – Chief Justice and former president William Howard Taft dies at the age of 72. Hoover declares 30 days of mourning.
- March 21 – Hoover nominates John J. Parker as a Supreme Court justice.

=== April 1930 ===
- April 16 – Lou Henry Hoover suffers a severe back injury after a fall at the White House.
- April 22 – The United States along with several other countries recognizes the Spanish Republic.
- April 28 – Hoover makes a statement to Congress recommending improvements to criminal law enforcement.

=== May 1930 ===
- May 7 – Hoover's nomination of John J. Parker to the Supreme Court is rejected by the Senate.
- May 9 – Hoover nominates Owen Roberts as a Supreme Court justice.
- May 28 – Hoover vetoes a bill that would expand pensions for Spanish–American War veterans.

=== June 1930 ===
- June 2 – Congress overrides Hoover's veto and expands pensions for Spanish–American War veterans.
- June 14 – The Federal Bureau of Narcotics is established within the Department of the Treasury.
- June 17 – Hoover signs the Smoot–Hawley Tariff Act into law.

=== July 1930 ===
- July 3 – Hoover signs the Veterans Administration Act, authorizing the formation of the Veterans' Administration.
- July 7 – Construction on the Hoover Dam begins.
- July 7 – Hoover urges the Senate to ratify the London Naval Treaty.
- July 21 – Hoover establishes the Veterans' Administration.

=== August 1930 ===
- August 5 – Hoover appoints Douglas MacArthur as Chief of Staff of the United States Army.
- August 14 – Hoover meets with 13 governors to discuss drought relief.

=== November 1930 ===
- November 4 – The 1930 United States elections take place and Republicans lose control of the House of Representatives.

=== December 1930 ===
- December 2 – Hoover requests funding for public works projects during the 1930 State of the Union Address.
- December 9 – William N. Doak takes office as Hoover's Secretary of Labor, replacing James J. Davis.
- December 20 – Hoover signs a bill authorizing $155 million of aid for public works and drought relief.
- December 23 – Hoover pardons former Indiana governor Warren T. McCray.
- December 30 – Hoover establishes the Colonial National Monument.
- December 31 – The Battle of Achuapa takes place in Nicaragua.

== 1931 ==
=== January 1931 ===
- January 6 – Hoover speaks to the National Automobile Chamber of Commerce.
- January 20 – Hoover releases the findings of the Wickersham Commission.
- January 30 – Hoover meets with R. B. Bennett at the White House.

=== February 1931 ===
- February 26 – Hoover vetoes the Emergency Adjusted Compensation Bill.
- February 27 – Congress overrides Hoover's veto of the Emergency Adjusted Compensation Bill.

=== March 1931 ===
- March 3 – Hoover signs the Davis–Bacon Act of 1931 into law.
- March 4 – Hoover signs a bill that establishes The Star-Spangled Banner as the national anthem of the United States of America.

=== May 1931 ===
- May 11 – Creditanstalt declares bankruptcy.

=== June 1931 ===
- June 20 – Hoover issues the Hoover Moratorium.

=== September 1931 ===
- September 29 – Britain abandons the gold standard.

=== October 1931 ===
- October 22 – Hoover meets with Prime Minister of France Pierre Laval at the White House.

=== November 1931 ===
- November 11 – Hoover dedicates the District of Columbia War Memorial.
- November 16 – Hoover meets with Italian Minister of Foreign Affairs Dino Grandi.

=== December 1931 ===
- December 7 – Hoover turns away the hunger march at the White House.
- December 8 – Hoover delivers the 1931 State of the Union Address.

== 1932 ==
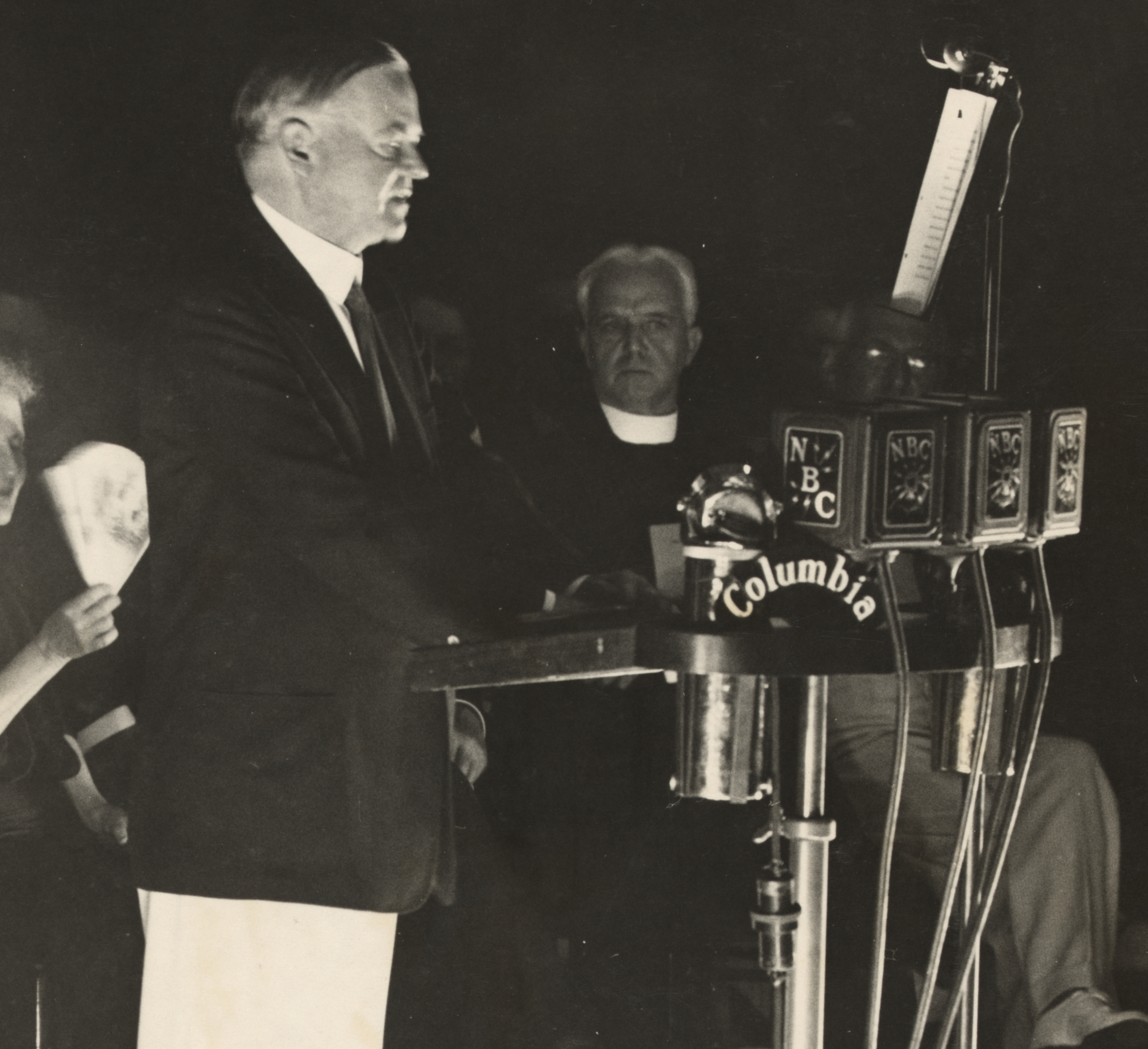
Hoover gives an acceptance speech for the Republican presidential nomination. August 11, 1932.

=== January 1932 ===
- January 7 – The United States declares its refusal to recognize territories occupied by the Empire of Japan.
- January 22 – Hoover establishes the Reconstruction Finance Corporation.

=== February 1932 ===
- February 12 – Ogden L. Mills takes office as Hoover's Secretary of the Treasury, replacing Andrew Mellon.
- February 15 – Hoover nominates Benjamin N. Cardozo as a Supreme Court justice.
- February 22 – Hoover honors the bicentennial of George Washington's birthday in a joint session of Congress.
- February 27 – Hoover signs the Glass–Steagall Act of 1932 into law.
- February 29 – Hoover appoints Theodore Roosevelt Jr. as Governor-General of the Philippines.

=== March 1932 ===
- March 1 – The Lindbergh kidnapping takes place.

=== April 1932 ===
- April 7 – Hoover vetoes an increase to veterans' pensions.

=== May 1932 ===
- May 9 – Hoover vetoes a bill that would grant access to old soldiers' home for civilians of the Quartermaster Corps.

=== June 1932 ===
- June 6 – Hoover signs the Revenue Act of 1932 into law.
- June 16 – The Republican Party nominates Hoover as its candidate for the 1932 United States presidential election.
- June 22 – Hoover submits disarmament proposals at the Conference for the Reduction and Limitation of Armaments.

=== July 1932 ===
- July 21 – Hoover signs the Emergency Relief and Construction Act into law.
- July 22 – Hoover signs the Federal Home Loan Bank Act into law.
- July 28 – Hoover orders the United States Army to clear Bonus Army protestors from Washington, D.C.

=== August 1932 ===
- August 8 – Roy D. Chapin takes office as Hoover's Secretary of Commerce, replacing Robert P. Lamont.
- August 11 – Hoover changes his stance on prohibition, saying it should be left to the states.

=== September 1932 ===
- September 26 – The Battle of Agua Carta takes place in Nicaragua.

=== November 1932 ===
- November 8 – Hoover loses the 1932 presidential election to the Governor of New York, Franklin D. Roosevelt in a landslide election.
- November 22 – Hoover meets with president-elect Franklin D. Roosevelt.

=== December 1932 ===
- December 6 – Hoover delivers the 1932 State of the Union Address.
- December 26 – The Battle of El Sauce takes place in Nicaragua.

== 1933 ==
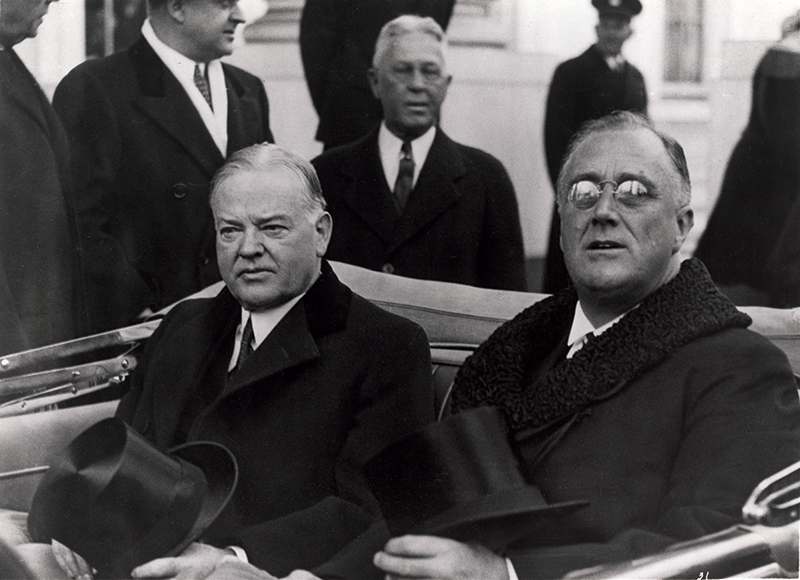
Hoover with Franklin D. Roosevelt at the latter's inauguration. March 4, 1933.

=== January 1933 ===
- January 2 – Hoover orders an end to the United States occupation of Nicaragua.
- January 13 – Hoover vetoes the Hare–Hawes–Cutting Act.
- January 17 – Congress overrides Hoover's veto of the Hare–Hawes–Cutting Act.
- January 23 – The Twentieth Amendment to the United States Constitution moved the beginning and ending of the terms of the president and vice president from March 4 to January 20, and of members of Congress from March 4 to January 3. It also has provisions that determine what is to be done when there is no president-elect.
- January 30 – Adolf Hitler takes power in Germany.

=== February 1933 ===
- February 11 – Hoover establishes Death Valley as a national monument.
- February 13 – Hoover delivers a farewell address at the Waldorf-Astoria Hotel.
- February 20 – The Blaine Act is passed, moving the United States toward repeal of Prohibition.
- February 25 – The first aircraft carrier of the United States Navy, the USS Ranger (CV-4), is christened by Lou Henry Hoover.

=== March 1933 ===
- March 2 – Hoover designates the Morristown National Historical Park as the country's first national historical park.
- March 3 – Hoover dedicates Mount Rushmore as a national memorial.
- March 3 – Hoover signs the Buy American Act into law.
- March 4 – Franklin D. Roosevelt is inaugurated as the 32nd president of the United States.

== See also ==
- Timeline of the Calvin Coolidge presidency, for his predecessor
- Timeline of the Franklin D. Roosevelt presidency, for his successor
