= Timeline of the Calvin Coolidge presidency =

The presidency of Calvin Coolidge began on August 2, 1923, when Calvin Coolidge became the 30th president of the United States upon the sudden death of Warren G. Harding, and ended on March 4, 1929.

== 1923 ==
- August 2–3 – The first inauguration of Calvin Coolidge takes place.
- August 4 – Coolidge declares a day of mourning and prayer for the funeral of Warren G. Harding to be observed on August 10.
- August 17 – The Washington Naval Treaty is ratified by the governments of the United Kingdom, the United States, the Empire of Japan, the French Third Republic, and the Kingdom of Italy.
- September 3 – Coolidge urges the American people to offer support in response to the Great Kantō earthquake.
- September 4 – The US Navy airship USS Shenandoah (ZR-1) makes its maiden voyage.
- September 8 – Seven US Navy destroyers run aground during the Honda Point disaster.
- October 25 – Coolidge establishes the Carlsbad Caverns National Park.
- December 6 – Coolidge delivers the 1923 State of the Union Address.

== 1924 ==
The first audiovisual recording of a US President. August 11, 1924.

- January 26 – Coolidge announces a special counsel to investigate the Teapot Dome scandal.
- February 8 – Coolidge ends the leases that were created as part of the Teapot Dome scandal.
- February 11 – The Senate passes a resolution 74-34 demanding the removal of Edwin Denby as Secretary of the Navy due to his involvement in the Teapot Dome scandal. Coolidge ignores the request.
- February 22 – Coolidge delivers the first ever radio broadcast from the White House.
- March 10 – Secretary of the Navy Edwin Denby resigns in disgrace following the Teapot Dome scandal.
- March 19 – Curtis D. Wilbur takes office as Secretary of the Navy.
- May 2 – Coolidge issues an arms embargo on Cuba in response to an uprising.
- May 10 – Coolidge appoints J. Edgar Hoover as the head of the FBI.
- May 15 – Coolidge vetoes the World War Adjusted Compensation Act.
- May 19 – Congress overrides Coolidge's veto of the World War Adjusted Compensation Act.
- May 24 – Coolidge signs the Rogers Act into law.
- May 26 – Coolidge signs the Immigration Act of 1924 into law.
- June 2 – Coolidge signs the Indian Citizenship Act and the Revenue Act of 1924 into law.
- June 7 – Coolidge signs the Anti-Heroin Act of 1924 into law.
- June 10–12 – Coolidge is chosen as the 1924 presidential nominee for the Republican Party.
- July 7 – Coolidge's son, Calvin Coolidge Jr., dies of sepsis at the age of 16.
- July 9 – Calvin Coolidge Jr.'s funeral is held.
- July 10 – Calvin Coolidge Jr. is buried at Plymouth Notch Cemetery in Vermont.
- July 13 – Horacio Vásquez is inaugurated as President of the Dominican Republic after nearly a decade of American occupation.
- August 11 – Lee de Forest records Coolidge on the White House lawn with Phonofilm, creating the first audiovisual recording of a US president.
- August 14 – Coolidge formally accepts his party's nomination for president in 1924.
- August 16 – The Dawes Plan is signed.
- August 30 – Coolidge meets with Edward VIII, Prince of Wales at the White House.
- September 21 – Coolidge gives a speech warning of the dangers of socialism.
- October 17 – Coolidge meets with several Broadway performers at the White House.
- November 4 – Coolidge wins reelection to the presidency against John W. Davis in the 1924 United States presidential election.
- December 3 – Coolidge delivers the 1924 State of the Union Address.

== 1925 ==
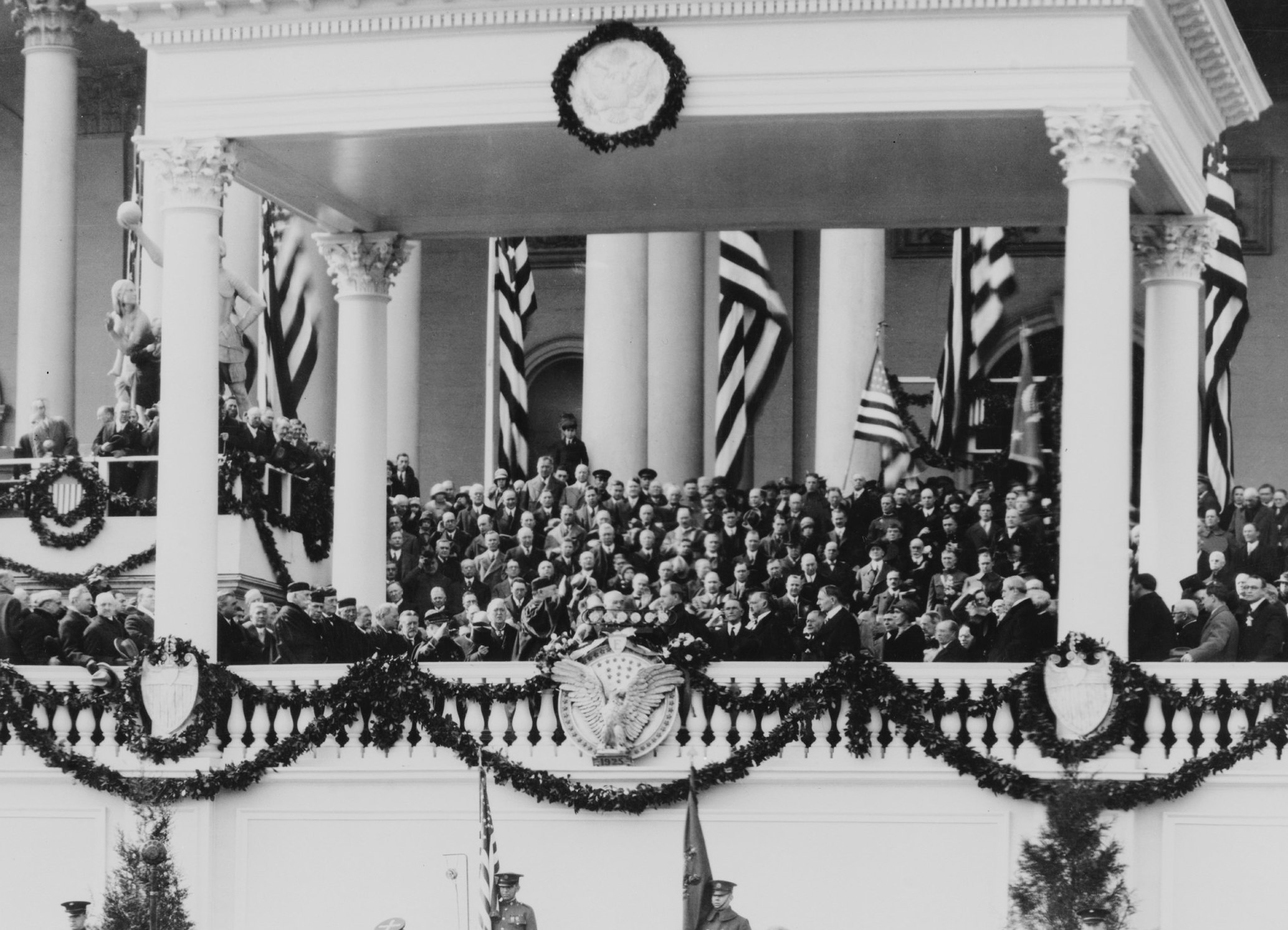
Coolidge is inaugurated after winning reelection. March 4, 1925.

- January 5 – Coolidge nominates Harlan F. Stone to the U.S. Supreme Court.
- February 2 – Coolidge signs the Air Mail Act of 1925 into law.
- February 5 – Harlan F. Stone is appointed an Associate Justice of the Supreme Court.
- February 12 – Coolidge signs the Federal Arbitration Act into law.
- March 3 – Coolidge signs the Helium Act of 1925 into law.
- March 3 – The Hay-Quesada Treaty is ratified.
- March 4 – The Second inauguration of Calvin Coolidge takes place.
- April 21 – Coolidge becomes the first president to give an address on film.
- May 3 – Coolidge speaks at the groundbreaking for the Washington, D.C. Jewish Community Center.
- October 20 – Coolidge gives a speech to the Annual Council of the Congregational Churches.
- November 19 – Coolidge calls for the United States to join the World Court.
- November 21 – Coolidge establishes the Lava Beds National Monument.
- December 4 – The Armenian Orphan Rug is presented to Coolidge.
- December 8 – Coolidge delivers the 1925 State of the Union Address.

== 1926 ==
- March 18 – Coolidge's father, John Calvin Coolidge Sr., dies at the age of 80.
- April 2 – Coolidge declines to send delegates to the League of Nations in regard to the World Court, recognizing them as two unrelated organizations.
- April 29 – The Mellon–Berenger Agreement is signed.
- May 2 – The Nicaraguan Civil War begins.
- May 20 – Coolidge signs the Air Commerce Act into law.
- May 25 – Coolidge signs the Public Buildings Act into law.
- October 19 – Coolidge dines with Queen Marie of Romania at the White House.
- October 25 – The Supreme Court rules that the president can unilaterally remove members of the cabinet in Myers v. United States.
- November 2 – In the 1926 midterm elections, The Republican Party lost nine seats to the Democratic Party in the House of Representatives but retained a majority. The Republicans also lost six seats to the Democrats in the U.S. Senate but retained their majority since Vice President Charles G. Dawes cast the tie-breaking vote.
- November 11 – Coolidge dedicates the Liberty Memorial.
- December 7 – Coolidge delivers the 1926 State of the Union Address.

== 1927 ==
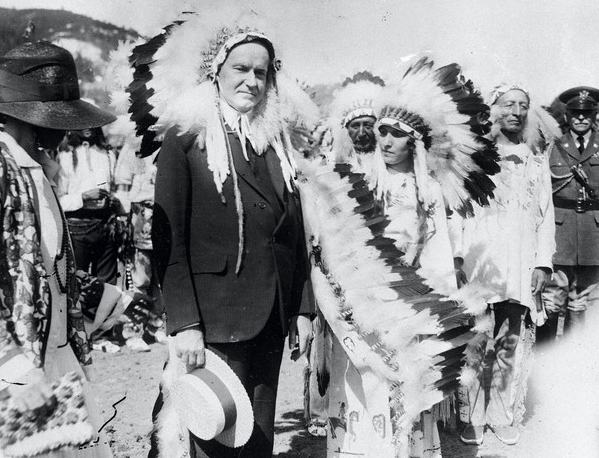
Coolidge visits a Native American tribe while in South Dakota. August 27, 1927.

- January 1 – The Cumberland River at Nashville topped levees at 56.2 feet, part of the Great Mississippi Flood of 1927.
- January 10 – Military deployments to China, Mexico, and Nicaragua are announced.
- February 10 – Coolidge announces to a joint session of Congress that he would organize a disarmament conference in Geneva.
- February 18 – Bilateral relations between the United States and Canada are established independently of the United Kingdom.
- February 23 – Coolidge signs the Radio Act of 1927 into law, creating the Federal Radio Commission.
- February 25 – Coolidge signs the McFadden Act into law.
- February 25 – Coolidge vetoes the McNary–Haugen Farm Relief Bill.
- March 1 – Coolidge moves into the Patterson Mansion while the White House undergoes repairs.
- May 4 – The Nicaraguan Civil War ends, with occasional rebel attacks persisting.
- May 16 – The Battle of La Paz Centro takes place in Nicaragua.
- June 13 – Coolidge and the First Lady depart for a vacation in South Dakota.
- June 15 – The Coolidges arrive in South Dakota.
- July 16 – The Battle of Ocotal takes place in Nicaragua.
- July 25 – The Battle of San Fernando takes place in Nicaragua.
- July 27 – The Battle of Santa Clara takes place in Nicaragua.
- August 2 – Coolidge states that "I do not choose to run" in 1928.
- August 4 – Coolidge is adopted into the Sioux tribe under the name Wamblee-Tokaha (English: Leading Eagle).
- August 10 – Coolidge dedicates Mount Rushmore and promises funding for the project.
- September 11 – Coolidge returns to the White House from South Dakota.
- September 19 – The Battle of Telpaneca takes place in Nicaragua.
- September 21 – Coolidge gives the Brave Little State of Vermont speech.
- October 9 – The Battle of Sapotillal takes place in Nicaragua.
- October 19 – Coolidge attends the dedication of the George Gordon Meade Memorial.
- November 18 – Coolidge commutes the sentence of Marcus Garvey.
- December 6 – Coolidge delivers the 1927 State of the Union Address.
- December 17 – The USS S-4 (SS-109) is destroyed in an accident.

== 1928 ==
- January 1 – The Battle of Las Cruces takes place in Nicaragua.
- January 15 – Coolidge visits Cuba. He will be the last sitting president to do so until Barack Obama in 2016.
- February 27 – The Battle of El Bramadero takes place in Nicaragua.
- May 4 – Coolidge nominates Genevieve R. Cline as the first woman on the federal judiciary.
- May 13 – The Battle of La Flor takes place in Nicaragua.
- May 15 – Coolidge signs the Flood Control Act of 1928 into law.
- May 22 – Coolidge signs the Capper–Ketcham Act into law.
- May 29 – Coolidge signs the Reed–Jenkins Act into law.
- August 27 – The Kellogg–Briand Pact is signed.
- November 6 – Herbert Hoover wins against Al Smith in the 1928 United States presidential election.
- December 4 – Coolidge delivers the 1928 State of the Union Address.
- December 22 – Coolidge pardons John W. Langley.

== 1929 ==
- January 19 – Coolidge signs the Narcotic Farms Act of 1929 into law.
- March 2 – Coolidge signs the Increased Penalties Act into law.
- March 4 – Herbert Hoover is inaugurated as the 31st president of the United States, at noon EST.

== See also ==
- Timeline of the Warren G. Harding presidency, for his predecessor
- Timeline of the Herbert Hoover presidency, for his successor
