= December 3 =

December 3 this year in various calendars
- Thursday, 3 December 2026
Akan	Nkyiyaw
Armenian	16 Kʿaloch 1476
Aztec	Tozoztontli 2, 3 Cuāuhtli
Babylonian	22 Arakhsamna, 2337 SE
Balinese pawukon	Menga, Kajeng, Sri, Wage, Urukung, Wraspati of Taulu, Sri, Gigis, Suka
Bengali	18 Ogrohayon, BS 1433
Chinese	Yin Metal Pig・Well Mansion; Fire Horse Year, Month 10, Day 25 (Xiaoxue, 4 days until Daxue)
Common Era	3 December 2026 CE
Coptic	24 Hathor, AM 1743
Egyptian	21 Pharmuthi, 2775 NE
Ethiopian	24 H̱edār, 2019 Amätä Məhrät
French Republican	Décade II, Duodi de Frimaire de l'Année 235 de la République
Gregorian	3 December, AD 2026
Hebrew	23 Kislev, AM 5787
Hindu	Uttaraphalgunī・Prīti; Solar: 17 Mārgaśīrṣa, 1948 SE; Lunisolar: Daśamī, Kṛishna pakṣa of Kārtika, 2083 VE; Rāudra・5127 KY・1,872,912
Icelandic	Fimmtudagur, 11 Ýlir 2026
Islamic	22 Jumada al-thani, AH 1448 (using tabular method)
ISO week date	2026-W49-4
Japanese	25 Kannazuki, Reiwa 8 (Shōsetsu, 4 days until Taisetsu)
Julian	20 November, AD 2026 (AM 7535)
Julian day	2461378
Korean	25 Dwaejidal, 4359 DE
Maya	13.0.14.2.15; 8 Mac, 3 Men
Roman	ante diem XII Kalendas Decembres, MMDCCLXXIX AUC
Solar Hijri	12 Azar, SH 1405
Tibetan	25 smin drug, me pho rta 2153 or 1772 or 1000

<<	December					>>
Su	Mo	Tu	We	Th	Fr	Sa
		1	2	3	4	5
6	7	8	9	10	11	12
13	14	15	16	17	18	19
20	21	22	23	24	25	26
27	28	29	30	31
2026

December 3 in recent years
2025 (Wednesday)
2024 (Tuesday)
2023 (Sunday)
2022 (Saturday)
2021 (Friday)
2020 (Thursday)
2019 (Tuesday)
2018 (Monday)
2017 (Sunday)
2016 (Saturday)

December 3 is the 337th day of the year (338th in leap years) in the Gregorian calendar; 28 days remain until the end of the year.

== Events ==
=== Pre-1600 ===
- 915 – Pope John X crowns Berengar I of Italy as Holy Roman Emperor (probable date).
- 1533 – Ivan IV succeeds his father Vasili III as Grand Prince of Muscovy at the age of three.

=== 1601–1900 ===
- 1775 – American Revolution: USS Alfred becomes the first vessel to fly the Continental Union Flag (precursor to the "Stars and Stripes"); the flag is hoisted by John Paul Jones.
- 1799 – War of the Second Coalition: Battle of Wiesloch: Austrian Lieutenant Field Marshal Anton Sztáray defeats the French at Wiesloch.
- 1800 – War of the Second Coalition: Battle of Hohenlinden: French General Jean Victor Marie Moreau decisively defeats the Archduke John of Austria near Munich. Coupled with First Consul Napoleon Bonaparte's earlier victory at Marengo, this will force the Austrians to sign an armistice and end the war.
- 1800 – United States presidential election: The Electoral College casts votes for president and vice president that result in a tie between Thomas Jefferson and Aaron Burr.
- 1818 – Illinois becomes the 21st U.S. state.
- 1834 – The Zollverein (German Customs Union) begins the first regular census in Germany.
- 1854 – Battle of the Eureka Stockade: More than 20 gold miners at Ballarat, Victoria, are killed by state troopers in an uprising over mining licences.
- 1859 – Nigeria's first newspaper, missionary Henry Townsend's Iwe Irohin, was published.
- 1881 – The first issue of Tamperean daily newspaper Aamulehti ("Morning Paper") is published.
- 1898 – The Duquesne Country and Athletic Club defeats an all-star collection of early football players 16–0, in what is considered to be the first all-star game for professional American football.

=== 1901–present ===
- 1901 – In a State of the Union message, U.S. President Theodore Roosevelt delivers a 20,000-word report to the House of Representatives asking Congress to curb the power of trusts "within reasonable limits". The speech was not delivered in person.
- 1904 – The Jovian moon Himalia is discovered by Charles Dillon Perrine at California's Lick Observatory.
- 1910 – Modern neon lighting is first demonstrated by Georges Claude at the Paris Motor Show.
- 1912 – Bulgaria, Greece, Montenegro, and Serbia (the Balkan League) sign an armistice with the Ottoman Empire, temporarily halting the First Balkan War. (The armistice will expire on February 3, 1913, and hostilities will resume.)
- 1919 – After nearly 20 years of planning and construction, including two collapses causing 89 deaths, the Quebec Bridge opens to traffic.
- 1920 – Following more than a month of Turkish–Armenian War, the Turkish-dictated Treaty of Alexandropol is concluded.
- 1925 – Final agreement is signed between the Irish Free State, Northern Ireland and the United Kingdom formalizing the Partition of Ireland.
- 1929 – President Herbert Hoover delivers his first State of the Union message to Congress. It is presented in the form of a written message rather than a speech.
- 1938 – Nazi Germany issues the Decree on the Utilization of Jewish Property forcing Jews to sell real property, businesses, and stocks at below market value as part of Aryanization.
- 1944 – Greek Civil War: Fighting breaks out in Athens between the ELAS and government forces supported by the British Army.
- 1954 – Väinö Linna's war novel The Unknown Soldier (Tuntematon sotilas) is published.
- 1959 – The current flag of Singapore is adopted, six months after Singapore became self-governing within the British Empire.
- 1960 – The musical Camelot debuts at the Majestic Theatre on Broadway. It will become associated with the Kennedy administration.
- 1965 – Soviet Union, Space probe of the Luna program, called Luna 8, is launched, but crashes on the Moon.
- 1967 – At Groote Schuur Hospital in Cape Town, South Africa, a transplant team headed by Christiaan Barnard carries out the first heart transplant on a human (53-year-old Louis Washkansky).
- 1971 – Indo-Pakistani War of 1971: Pakistan launches a pre-emptive strike against India and a full-scale war begins.
- 1972 – Spantax Flight 275 crashes during takeoff from Tenerife North–Ciudad de La Laguna Airport, killing all 155 people on board.
- 1973 – Pioneer program: Pioneer 10 sends back the first close-up images of Jupiter.
- 1979 – In Cincinnati, 11 fans are suffocated in a crush for seats on the concourse outside Riverfront Coliseum before a Who concert.
- 1979 – Iranian Revolution: Ayatollah Ruhollah Khomeini becomes the first Supreme Leader of Iran.
- 1982 – A soil sample is taken from Times Beach, Missouri, that will be found to contain 300 times the safe level of dioxin.
- 1984 – Bhopal disaster: A methyl isocyanate leak from a Union Carbide pesticide plant in Bhopal, India, kills more than 3,800 people outright and injures 150,000–600,000 others (some 6,000 of whom later died from their injuries) in one of the worst industrial disasters in history.
- 1989 – In a meeting off the coast of Malta, U.S. President George H. W. Bush and Soviet General Secretary Mikhail Gorbachev release statements indicating that the Cold War between NATO and the Warsaw Pact may be coming to an end.
- 1992 – The Greek oil tanker Aegean Sea, carrying 80,000 tonnes of crude oil, runs aground in a storm while approaching A Coruña, Spain, and spills much of its cargo.
- 1992 – A test engineer for Sema Group uses a personal computer to send the world's first text message via the Vodafone network to the phone of a colleague.
- 1994 – Taiwan holds its first full local elections; James Soong elected as the first and only directly elected Governor of Taiwan, Chen Shui-bian became the first directly elected Mayor of Taipei, Wu Den-yih became the first directly elected Mayor of Kaohsiung.
- 1994 – Sony releases the PlayStation game console in Japan.
- 1995 – Cameroon Airlines Flight 3701 crashes on approach to Douala International Airport in Douala, Cameroon, killing 71 of the 76 people on board.
- 1997 – In Ottawa, Ontario, Canada, representatives from 121 countries sign the Ottawa Treaty prohibiting manufacture and deployment of anti-personnel landmines. The United States, People's Republic of China, and Russia do not sign the treaty, however.
- 1999 – NASA loses radio contact with the Mars Polar Lander moments before the spacecraft enters the Martian atmosphere.
- 1999 – In Worcester, Massachusetts, firefighters responded to a fire at the Worcester Cold Storage and Warehouse Co. facility, which takes the lives of 6 firefighters.
- 2005 – XCOR Aerospace makes the first crewed rocket aircraft delivery of U.S. Mail in Kern County, California.
- 2007 – Winter storms cause the Chehalis River to flood many cities in Lewis County, Washington, and close a 32-kilometre (20 mi) portion of Interstate 5 for several days. At least eight deaths and billions of dollars in damages are blamed on the floods.
- 2009 – A suicide bombing at a hotel in Mogadishu, Somalia, kills 25 people, including three ministers of the Transitional Federal Government.
- 2012 – At least 475 people are killed after Typhoon Bopha makes landfall in the Philippines.
- 2014 – The Japanese space agency, JAXA, launches the space explorer Hayabusa2 from the Tanegashima Space Center on a six-year round trip mission to an asteroid to collect rock samples.
- 2022 – Massive power outage after Moore County substation attack that leaves 45,000 people without power for five days, leading to an FBI probe.
- 2023 – Mount Marapi located in West Sumatra, Indonesia begins a sporadic series of eruptions. 23 people were killed, and 12 were injured.
- 2024 – Martial law is declared in South Korea.

== Births ==
=== Pre-1600 ===
- 1368 – Charles VI of France (died 1422)
- 1447 – Bayezid II, Ottoman sultan (died 1512)
- 1483 – Nicolaus von Amsdorf, German theologian and Protestant reformer (died 1565)
- 1560 – Jan Gruter, Dutch scholar and critic (died 1627)
- 1590 – Daniel Seghers, Flemish Jesuit brother and painter (died 1661)

=== 1601–1900 ===
- 1616 – John Wallis, English mathematician and cryptographer (died 1703)
- 1684 – Ludvig Holberg, Norwegian historian and writer (died 1754)
- 1722 – Hryhorii Skovoroda, Ukrainian poet, composer, and philosopher (died 1794)
- 1729 – Antonio Soler, Spanish composer and theorist (died 1783)
- 1730 – Mahadaji Shinde, Maratha ruler of Gwalior (died 1794)
- 1755 – Gilbert Stuart, American painter (died 1828)
- 1793 – Clarkson Frederick Stanfield, English painter and academic (died 1867)
- 1798 – Alfred Iverson Sr., American politician (died 1873)
- 1800 – France Prešeren, Slovenian poet and lawyer (died 1849)
- 1810 – Louisa Susannah Cheves McCord, American author and political essayist (died 1879)
- 1826 – George B. McClellan, American general and politician, 24th Governor of New Jersey (died 1885)
- 1827 – Lombe Atthill, Northern Irish obstetrician and gynaecologist (died 1910)
- 1833 – Carlos Finlay, Cuban epidemiologist and physician (died 1915)
- 1838 – Cleveland Abbe, American meteorologist and academic (died 1916)
- 1838 – Octavia Hill, English activist and author (died 1912)
- 1838 – Princess Louise of Prussia (died 1923)
- 1842 – Phoebe Hearst, American philanthropist and activist (died 1919)
- 1842 – Charles Alfred Pillsbury, American businessman, founded the Pillsbury Company (died 1899)
- 1842 – Ellen Swallow Richards, American chemist, ecologist, and educator (died 1911)
- 1848 – William Shiels, Irish-Australian politician, 16th Premier of Victoria (died 1904)
- 1850 – Richard Butler, English-Australian politician, 23rd Premier of South Australia (died 1925)
- 1856 – George Leake, Australian politician, 3rd Premier of Western Australia (died 1902)
- 1857 – Joseph Conrad, Polish-born British novelist (died 1924)
- 1857 – Mathilde Kralik, Austrian pianist and composer (died 1944)
- 1863 – Gussie Davis, African-American songwriter (died 1899)
- 1864 – Herman Heijermans, Dutch author and playwright (died 1924)
- 1867 – William John Bowser, Canadian lawyer and politician, 17th Premier of British Columbia (died 1933)
- 1872 – Arthur Charles Hardy, Canadian lawyer and politician, Canadian Speaker of the Senate (died 1962)
- 1872 – William Haselden, English cartoonist (died 1953)
- 1875 – Max Meldrum, Scottish-Australian painter and educator (died 1955)
- 1878 – Francis A. Nixon, American businessman (died 1956)
- 1879 – Albert Asher, New Zealand rugby player (died 1965)
- 1879 – Charles Hutchison, American actor, director, and screenwriter (died 1949)
- 1879 – Kafū Nagai, Japanese author and playwright (died 1959)
- 1879 – Donald Matheson Sutherland, Canadian physician and politician, 5th Canadian Minister of National Defence (died 1970)
- 1880 – Fedor von Bock, German field marshal (died 1945)
- 1883 – Anton Webern, Austrian composer and conductor (died 1945)
- 1884 – Rajendra Prasad, Indian lawyer and politician, 1st President of India (died 1963)
- 1884 – Walther Stampfli, Swiss lawyer and politician, 50th President of the Swiss Confederation (died 1965)
- 1886 – Manne Siegbahn, Swedish physicist and academic, Nobel Prize laureate (died 1978)
- 1887 – Prince Naruhiko Higashikuni, Japanese general and politician, 43rd Prime Minister of Japan (died 1990)
- 1891 – Thomas Farrell, American general (died 1967)
- 1894 – Deiva Zivarattinam, Indian lawyer and politician (died 1975)
- 1895 – Anna Freud, Austrian-English psychologist and psychoanalyst (died 1982)
- 1895 – Sheng Shicai, Chinese warlord (died 1970)
- 1897 – William Gropper, American cartoonist and painter (died 1977)
- 1899 – Hayato Ikeda, Japanese politician, 58th Prime Minister of Japan (died 1965)
- 1899 – Howard Kinsey, American tennis player (died 1966)
- 1900 – Bert Hawke, Australian politician, 18th Premier of Western Australia (died 1986)
- 1900 – Ulrich Inderbinen, Swiss mountaineer (died 2004)
- 1900 – Richard Kuhn, Austrian-German biochemist and academic, Nobel Prize laureate (died 1967)

=== 1901–present ===
- 1901 – Glenn Hartranft, American shot putter and discus thrower (died 1970)
- 1901 – Mildred Wiley, American high jumper (died 2000)
- 1902 – Mitsuo Fuchida, Japanese captain and pilot (died 1976)
- 1902 – Feliks Kibbermann, Estonian chess player and philologist (died 1993)
- 1904 – Edgar Moon, Australian tennis player (died 1976)
- 1905 – Les Ames, English cricketer (died 1990)
- 1907 – Connee Boswell, American jazz singer (died 1976)
- 1911 – Nino Rota, Italian pianist, composer, conductor, and academic (died 1979)
- 1914 – Irving Fine, American composer and academic (died 1962)
- 1918 – Abdul Haris Nasution, Indonesian general and politician, 12th Indonesian Minister of Defence (died 2000)
- 1919 – Charles Lynch, Canadian journalist and author (died 1994)
- 1921 – Phyllis Curtin, American soprano and academic (died 2016)
- 1921 – John Doar, American lawyer and activist (died 2014)
- 1922 – Len Lesser, American actor (died 2011)
- 1922 – Eli Mandel, Canadian poet, critic, and academic (died 1992)
- 1922 – Sven Nykvist, Swedish director and cinematographer (died 2006)
- 1923 – Trevor Bailey, English cricketer and sportscaster (died 2011)
- 1923 – Stjepan Bobek, Croatian-Serbian footballer and manager (died 2010)
- 1923 – Moyra Fraser, Australian-English actress, singer, and dancer (died 2009)
- 1924 – John Backus, American computer scientist, led the team that developed FORTRAN (died 2007)
- 1924 – Wiel Coerver, Dutch footballer and manager (died 2011)
- 1924 – F. Sionil José, Filipino journalist, writer and author (died 2022)
- 1924 – Roberto Mieres, Argentinian race car driver and sailor (died 2012)
- 1925 – Ferlin Husky, American country music singer (died 2011)
- 1926 – Bob Rogers, Australian radio and television host (died 2024)
- 1927 – Andy Williams, American singer (died 2012)
- 1928 – Thomas M. Foglietta, American politician and diplomat, United States Ambassador to Italy (died 2004)
- 1928 – Muhammad Habibur Rahman, Indian-Bangladeshi jurist and politician, Prime Minister of Bangladesh (died 2014)
- 1929 – John S. Dunne, American priest and theologian (died 2013)
- 1930 – Jean-Luc Godard, French-Swiss director and screenwriter (died 2022)
- 1930 – Raul M. Gonzalez, Filipino lawyer and politician, 42nd Filipino Secretary of Justice (died 2014)
- 1930 – Yves Trudeau, Canadian sculptor (died 2017)
- 1931 – Franz Josef Degenhardt, German author and poet (died 2011)
- 1931 – Jaye P. Morgan, American singer and actress (died 2026)
- 1932 – Takao Fujinami, Japanese lawyer and politician (died 2007)
- 1933 – Nicolas Coster, British-American actor (died 2023)
- 1933 – Paul J. Crutzen, Dutch chemist and engineer, Nobel Prize laureate (died 2021)
- 1934 – Viktor Gorbatko, Russian general, pilot and cosmonaut (died 2017)
- 1934 – Abimael Guzmán, Peruvian philosopher and academic (died 2021)
- 1935 – Eddie Bernice Johnson, American nurse and politician (died 2023)
- 1937 – Bobby Allison, American race car driver and businessman (died 2024)
- 1937 – Morgan Llywelyn, American-Irish model and author
- 1938 – Jean-Claude Malépart, Canadian lawyer and politician (died 1989)
- 1938 – Sally Shlaer, American mathematician and engineer (died 1998)
- 1939 – John Paul Sr., Dutch-American race car driver
- 1939 – David Phillips, English chemist and academic
- 1940 – Jeffrey R. Holland, American academic and religious leader (died 2025)
- 1942 – Mike Gibson, Northern Irish-Irish rugby player
- 1942 – Pedro Rocha, Uruguayan footballer and manager (died 2013)
- 1942 – Alice Schwarzer, German journalist and publisher, founded EMMA Magazine
- 1942 – David K. Shipler, American journalist and author
- 1943 – Joseph Franklin Ada, American lawyer and politician, 5th Governor of Guam
- 1943 – J. Philippe Rushton, English-Canadian psychologist and academic (died 2012)
- 1944 – Ralph McTell, English singer-songwriter and guitarist
- 1944 – Craig Raine, English poet, author, and playwright
- 1944 – António Variações, Portuguese musician (died 1984)
- 1948 – Jan Hrubý, Czech violinist and songwriter
- 1948 – Maxwell Hutchinson, English architect and television host
- 1948 – Ozzy Osbourne, English singer-songwriter (died 2025)
- 1949 – Heather Menzies, Canadian-American actress (died 2017)
- 1949 – Mickey Thomas, American singer-songwriter
- 1950 – Alberto Juantorena, Cuban runner
- 1951 – Mike Bantom, American basketball player and coach
- 1951 – Jim Brewer, American basketball player
- 1951 – Ray Candy, American wrestler and trainer (died 1994)
- 1951 – Riki Choshu, Japanese-South Korean professional wrestler
- 1951 – Rick Mears, American race car driver
- 1951 – Mike Stock, English songwriter, record producer, and musician
- 1952 – Don Barnes, American singer-songwriter and guitarist
- 1952 – Benny Hinn, Israeli-American evangelist and author
- 1952 – Duane Roland, American guitarist and songwriter (died 2006)
- 1952 – Mel Smith, English comedian, actor, director, and producer (died 2013)
- 1953 – Franz Klammer, Austrian skier and race car driver
- 1953 – Rob Waring, American-Norwegian vibraphonist and contemporary composer
- 1954 – Grace Andreacchi, American-English author, poet, and playwright
- 1955 – Steven Culp, American actor
- 1956 – Émile Gros Raymond Nakombo, Central African politician, Mayor of Bangui
- 1956 – Ewa Kopacz, Polish physician and politician, 15th Prime Minister of Poland
- 1957 – Maxim Korobov, Russian businessman and politician
- 1959 – Eamonn Holmes, Irish journalist and game show host
- 1960 – Daryl Hannah, American actress and producer
- 1960 – Igor Larionov, Russian ice hockey player
- 1960 – Julianne Moore, American actress and author
- 1960 – Mike Ramsey, American ice hockey player and coach
- 1961 – Ben Baldanza, American economist and business executive (died 2024)
- 1962 – Richard Bacon, English banker, journalist, and politician
- 1962 – Nataliya Grygoryeva, Ukrainian hurdler
- 1962 – Tammy Jackson, American basketball player
- 1963 – Joe Lally, American singer-songwriter and bass player
- 1963 – Terri Schiavo, American medical patient (died 2005)
- 1964 – Darryl Hamilton, American baseball player and sportscaster (died 2015)
- 1965 – Andrew Stanton, American voice actor, director, producer, screenwriter
- 1965 – Katarina Witt, German figure skater and actress
- 1966 – Tatjana Greif, Slovenian politician
- 1966 – Flemming Povlsen, Danish footballer and manager
- 1966 – Irina Zhuk, Russian figure skater and coach
- 1967 – Marie Françoise Ouedraogo, Burkinabé mathematician
- 1968 – Brendan Fraser, American actor and producer
- 1968 – Montell Jordan, American singer-songwriter and producer
- 1969 – Bill Steer, English guitarist and songwriter
- 1969 – Hal Steinbrenner, American businessman
- 1970 – Paul Byrd, American baseball player
- 1970 – Lindsey Hunter, American basketball player and coach
- 1970 – Christian Karembeu, French footballer
- 1970 – Laura Schuler, Canadian ice hockey player and coach
- 1971 – Heiko Herrlich, German footballer and manager
- 1971 – Frank Sinclair, English-Jamaican footballer and manager
- 1971 – Henk Timmer, Dutch footballer and manager
- 1971 – Vernon White, American mixed martial artist and wrestler
- 1972 – Danilo Goffi, Italian runner
- 1973 – Bruno Campos, Brazilian-American actor and lawyer
- 1973 – Holly Marie Combs, American actress and producer
- 1973 – MC Frontalot, American rapper
- 1973 – Charl Willoughby, South African cricketer
- 1974 – Lucette Rådström, Swedish journalist
- 1976 – Mark Boucher, South African cricketer
- 1976 – Gary Glover, American baseball player
- 1976 – Cornelius Griffin, American football player
- 1976 – Byron Kelleher, New Zealand rugby player
- 1976 – Tomotaka Okamoto, Japanese soprano
- 1977 – Chad Durbin, American baseball player
- 1977 – Troy Evans, American football player
- 1977 – Adam Małysz, Polish ski jumper and race car driver
- 1977 – Yelena Zadorozhnaya, Russian runner
- 1978 – Daniel Alexandersson, Swedish footballer
- 1978 – Jiří Bicek, Slovak ice hockey player
- 1978 – Bram Tankink, Dutch cyclist
- 1978 – Trina, American rapper and producer
- 1979 – Daniel Bedingfield, New Zealand-English singer-songwriter
- 1979 – Rock Cartwright, American football player
- 1979 – Tiffany Haddish, American comedian and actress
- 1979 – Sean Parker, American entrepreneur and philanthropist
- 1980 – Carrie Bickmore, Australian radio and television host
- 1980 – Anna Chlumsky, American actress
- 1980 – Jenna Dewan, American actress and dancer
- 1980 – Zlata Filipović, Bosnian-Irish diarist
- 1981 – Ioannis Amanatidis, Greek footballer
- 1981 – Brian Bonsall, American actor and musician
- 1981 – Tyjuan Hagler, American football player
- 1981 – Edwin Valero, Venezuelan boxer (died 2010)
- 1981 – David Villa, Spanish footballer
- 1982 – Manny Corpas, Panamanian baseball player
- 1982 – Michael Essien, Ghanaian footballer
- 1982 – Dascha Polanco, Dominican-American actress
- 1982 – Franco Sbaraglini, Argentinian-Italian rugby player
- 1983 – Stephen Donald, New Zealand rugby player
- 1983 – Aleksey Drozdov, Russian decathlete
- 1983 – Sherri DuPree, American singer-songwriter and guitarist
- 1983 – Andy Grammer, American singer, songwriter, and record producer
- 1983 – James Ihedigbo, American football player
- 1984 – Manuel Arana, Spanish footballer
- 1984 – Avraam Papadopoulos, Greek footballer
- 1985 – Nina Ansaroff, American martial artist
- 1985 – László Cseh, Hungarian swimmer
- 1985 – Mike Randolph, American soccer player
- 1985 – Brian Roberts, American basketball player
- 1985 – Amanda Seyfried, American actress
- 1985 – Robert Swift, American basketball player
- 1985 – Marcus Williams, American basketball player
- 1986 – James Laurinaitis, American football player
- 1987 – Michael Angarano, American actor, director, and screenwriter
- 1987 – Eric Barone, American video game designer and musician
- 1987 – Erik Grönwall, Swedish singer-songwriter
- 1987 – Brian Robiskie, American football player
- 1987 – Alicia Sacramone, American gymnast
- 1988 – Melissa Aldana, Chilean saxophonist
- 1989 – Selçuk Alibaz, Turkish footballer
- 1989 – Alex McCarthy, English footballer
- 1989 – Tomasz Narkun, Polish mixed martial artist
- 1990 – Christian Benteke, Belgian footballer
- 1990 – Sharon Fichman, Canadian-Israeli tennis player
- 1990 – Matt Reynolds, American baseball player
- 1991 – Ekaterine Gorgodze, Georgian tennis player
- 1992 – Cristian Ceballos, Spanish footballer
- 1992 – Joseph McManners, English singer-songwriter, musician and actor
- 1994 – Jake T. Austin, American actor
- 1994 – Lil Baby, American rapper
- 1994 – Solomone Kata, New Zealand rugby league player
- 1994 – Bernarda Pera, American tennis player
- 1995 – Julius Honka, Finnish ice hockey player
- 1995 – Angèle, Belgian singer

== Deaths ==
=== Pre-1600 ===
- 311 – Diocletian, Roman emperor (born 244)
- 649 – Birinus, French-English bishop and saint (born 600)
- 860 – Abbo, bishop of Auxerre
- 937 – Siegfried, Frankish nobleman
- 978 – Abraham, Coptic pope of Alexandria
- 1038 – Emma of Lesum, Saxon countess and Saint
- 1099 – Saint Osmund (born 1065)
- 1154 – Pope Anastasius IV (born 1073)
- 1265 – Odofredus, Italian lawyer and jurist
- 1266 – Henry III the White, Duke of Wroclaw
- 1309 – Henry III, Duke of Głogów (born 1251/60)
- 1322 – Maud Chaworth, Countess of Leicester (born 1282)
- 1532 – Louis II, Count Palatine of Zweibrücken (born 1502)
- 1533 – Vasili III of Russia (born 1479)
- 1542 – Jean Tixier de Ravisi, French scholar and academic (born 1470)
- 1552 – Francis Xavier, Spanish missionary and saint (born 1506)
- 1592 – Alexander Farnese, Duke of Parma (born 1545)

=== 1601–1900 ===
- 1610 – Honda Tadakatsu, Japanese general and daimyō (born 1548)
- 1668 – William Cecil, 2nd Earl of Salisbury (born 1591)
- 1691 – Katherine Jones, Viscountess Ranelagh, British scientist (born 1615)
- 1706 – Countess Emilie Juliane of Barby-Mühlingen (born 1637)
- 1752 – Henri-Guillaume Hamal, Walloon musician and composer (born 1685)
- 1765 – Lord John Sackville, English cricketer and politician (born 1713)
- 1789 – Claude Joseph Vernet, French painter (born 1714)
- 1815 – John Carroll, American archbishop (born 1735)
- 1854 – Edward Thonen, German emigrant to Australia (born 1827)
- 1876 – Samuel Cooper, American general (born 1798)
- 1882 – Archibald Tait, Scottish-English archbishop (born 1811)
- 1888 – Carl Zeiss, German physicist and lens maker, created the optical instrument (born 1816)
- 1890 – Billy Midwinter, English-Australian cricketer (born 1851)
- 1892 – Afanasy Fet, Russian author and poet (born 1820)
- 1894 – Robert Louis Stevenson, Scottish novelist, poet, and essayist (born 1850)

=== 1901–present ===
- 1902 – Robert Lawson, New Zealand architect, designed the Otago Boys' High School and Knox Church (born 1833)
- 1904 – David Bratton, American water polo player (born 1869)
- 1910 – Mary Baker Eddy, American religious leader and author, founded Christian Science (born 1821)
- 1912 – Prudente de Morais, Brazilian lawyer and politician, 3rd President of Brazil (born 1841)
- 1917 – Harold Garnett, English-French cricketer (born 1879)
- 1919 – Pierre-Auguste Renoir, French painter and sculptor (born 1841)
- 1928 – Ezra Meeker, American farmer and politician (born 1830)
- 1934 – Charles James O'Donnell, Irish lawyer and politician (born 1849)
- 1935 – Princess Victoria of the United Kingdom (born 1868)
- 1937 – William Propsting, Australian politician, 20th Premier of Tasmania (born 1861)
- 1941 – Pavel Filonov, Russian painter and poet (born 1883)
- 1949 – Maria Ouspenskaya, Russian-American actress and educator (born 1876)
- 1952 – Rudolf Margolius, Czech lawyer and politician (born 1913)
- 1956 – Manik Bandopadhyay, Indian author, poet, and playwright (born 1908)
- 1956 – Alexander Rodchenko, Russian sculptor, photographer, and graphic designer (born 1891)
- 1967 – Harry Wismer, American football player and sportscaster (born 1913)
- 1972 – William Manuel Johnson, American bassist (born 1872)
- 1973 – Emile Christian, American trombonist, cornet player, and composer (born 1895)
- 1973 – Adolfo Ruiz Cortines, President of Mexico, 1952–1958 (born 1889)
- 1979 – Dhyan Chand, Indian field hockey player and coach (born 1905)
- 1980 – Oswald Mosley, English lieutenant, fascist, and politician, Chancellor of the Duchy of Lancaster (born 1896)
- 1981 – Walter Knott, American farmer, founded Knott's Berry Farm (born 1889)
- 1981 – Joel Rinne, Finnish actor (born 1897)
- 1984 – Vladimir Abramovich Rokhlin, Azerbaijani-Russian mathematician and academic (born 1919)
- 1989 – Fernando Martín Espina, Spanish basketball player (born 1962)
- 1989 – Connie B. Gay, American businessman, founded the Country Music Association (born 1914)
- 1993 – Lewis Thomas, American physician, etymologist, and academic (born 1913)
- 1996 – Georges Duby, French historian and author (born 1919)
- 1998 – Pierre Hétu, Canadian pianist and conductor (born 1936)
- 1999 – John Archer, American actor (born 1915)
- 1999 – Scatman John, American singer-songwriter and pianist (born 1942)
- 1999 – Madeline Kahn, American actress, comedian, and singer (born 1942)
- 1999 – Horst Mahseli, Polish footballer (born 1934)
- 1999 – Jarl Wahlström, Finnish 12th General of The Salvation Army (born 1918)
- 2000 – Gwendolyn Brooks, American poet and educator (born 1917)
- 2000 – Hoyt Curtin, American composer and producer (born 1922)
- 2002 – Adrienne Adams, American illustrator (born 1906)
- 2002 – Glenn Quinn, Irish-American actor (born 1970)
- 2003 – David Hemmings, English actor (born 1941)
- 2003 – Sita Ram Goel, Indian historian, publisher and writer (born 1921)
- 2004 – Shiing-Shen Chern, Chinese-American mathematician and academic (born 1911)
- 2005 – Frederick Ashworth, American admiral (born 1912)
- 2005 – Herb Moford, American baseball player (born 1928)
- 2005 – Kikka Sirén, Finnish pop/schlager singer (born 1964)
- 2007 – James Kemsley, Australian cartoonist and actor (born 1948)
- 2008 – Robert Zajonc, Polish-American psychologist and author (born 1923)
- 2009 – Leila Lopes, Brazilian actress and journalist (born 1959)
- 2009 – Richard Todd, Irish-born British soldier and actor (born 1919)
- 2010 – Abdumalik Bahori, Azerbaijani poet and author (born 1927)
- 2011 – Dev Anand, Indian actor, director, and producer (born 1923)
- 2012 – Jules Mikhael Al-Jamil, Iraqi-Lebanese archbishop (born 1938)
- 2014 – Herman Badillo, Puerto Rican-American lawyer and politician (born 1929)
- 2015 – Gladstone Anderson, Jamaican singer and pianist (born 1934)
- 2015 – Scott Weiland, American singer-songwriter (born 1967)
- 2019 – Ragnar Ulstein, Norwegian journalist and war historian (born 1920)
- 2024 – Mohamed Ali Yusuf, Somali politician (born 1944)

== Holidays and observances ==
- Christian feast day:
  - Abbo of Auxerre
  - Pope Abraham of Alexandria (Coptic, 6 Koiak))
  - Adrian (Ethernan)
  - Birinus
  - Cassian of Tangier
  - Emma (of Lesum or of Bremen)
  - Francis Xavier
  - Blessed Johann Nepomuk von Tschiderer zu Gleifheim
  - Zephaniah
  - December 3 (Eastern Orthodox liturgics)
- Doctors' Day (Cuba)
- International Day of Persons with Disabilities
