= Rådström =

Rådström is a surname. Notable people with the surname include:

- Britta Rådström (1954–2015), Swedish politician
- Hans Rådström (1919–1970), Swedish mathematician
- Karin Rådström (born 1979), Swedish engineer and business executive
- Lucette Rådström (born 1974), Swedish journalist
- Niklas Rådström (born 1953), Swedish poet and writer
- Pär Rådström (1925–1963), Swedish writer and journalist
- Thomas Rådström (born 1966), Swedish rally and rallycross driver
