= Rudström =

Rudström is a Swedish surname. Notable people with the surname include:

- Björn Rudström (born 1954), Swedish curler and coach
- Håkan Rudström (born 1957), Swedish curler and coach
- Karin Rudström (born 1988), Swedish curler

== See also ==
- Rådström
