= Presidency of Franklin D. Roosevelt =

For the presidency of Franklin D. Roosevelt, the United States presidential administration from 1933 to 1945, see:

- Presidency of Franklin D. Roosevelt (1933–1941), first and second terms
- Presidency of Franklin D. Roosevelt (1941–1945), third and fourth terms

== See also ==
- Timeline of the Franklin D. Roosevelt presidency
