= Timeline of the Franklin D. Roosevelt presidency =

The presidency of Franklin D. Roosevelt began on March 4, 1933.

== 1933 ==
- March 4 – First inauguration of Franklin D. Roosevelt
- March 5 - President Roosevelt calls for the 73rd United States Congress to participate in an extraordinary session the following Thursday, March 9. During the night hours he proclaims a national holiday during the midnight of March 9.
- March 6 - President Roosevelt announces his intent to have deposits in banks held in a cash form, followed by being sent to the federal reserve bank or turned into government bonds.
- March 6 - Secretary of the Treasury William H. Woodin issues a regulation allowing the reopening of banks the following day for submitting of new deposits.
- March 6 - President Roosevelt is announced as having left the Roosevelt & O'Connor law firm.
- March 6 - Former President Herbert Hoover signals support for President Roosevelt's emergency banking program and urges others to do the same.
- March 6 - Secretary of the Treasury Woodin announces regulations applicable during the national banking holiday.
- March 6 - Senate Democrats consent to voting as a collective in favor of recommendations President Roosevelt submitted whenever one of them is dictated to the caucus. The move is seen as assuring that any legislation President Roosevelt requests will pass through the Senate.
- March 7 - President Roosevelt holds a two-hour session with members of his cabinet deciding the banks would be reopened under conditions that would give depositors confidence along with a haste-filled return of hoarding currency. President Roosevelt accepts the resignation of his cousin Governor General of the Philippines Theodore Roosevelt Jr.
- March 8 - President Roosevelt announces a program's completion to reopen banks across the US. President Roosevelt holds his first news conference.
- December 1 - Agriculture Secretary Wallace announces a Ford dealer bid for 700 trucks on the part of the civilian conservation corps during the evening.
- December 2 - Interior Secretary Ickes says 8,000,000 are currently working under easy money allotments. Treasury Department reports showing the debt will be higher than at any point in history if the recovery drive fulfills expectations are made public.
- December 4 - The State Department receives formal notification on the part of Texas in regards to the repeal of the prohibition amendment.
- December 5 - Secretary Ickes announces the formation of the Federal Substance Homesteads, a corporation meant to inaugurate and administrate substance homestead projects.
- December 6 - President Roosevelt condemns lynching during an address to Protestant churchmen in Washington.
- December 7 - Secretary Ickes announces the US will not spend funds for sea domes across the trans-Atlantic airway until Europe issues a pledge that its troops will not use the creation to fly across to America.
- December 8 - Secretary Ickes announces the creation of 12,000 new jobs as a result of a loan of US$34 million to the Chicago Sanitary District.
- December 9 - Secretary Ickes issues an order warning public works employees against manufactures' agent James Bernard.
- December 11 - President Roosevelt holds his first news conference with joint senate and house on liquor taxes committee members and stresses the new federal taxes would have to be low enough to drown out bootleggers of liquor with inexpensive legal liquor.
- December 12 - Labor Secretary Perkins apologizes for remarks in the spring that were interpreted as implying she believed the south was in need of footwear during a speech in Atlanta, Georgia.
- December 14 - Secretary of Agriculture Wallace's annual report, in which he states the New Deal will require government regulations on business enterprise profits, is made public. Acting Secretary of Treasury Morgenthau declares he will not accept compromises on civil income tax claims.
- December 15 - Acting Secretary of Treasury Morgenthau discusses tax proposals while speaking to the house ways and means subcommittee on Capitol Hill.
- December 18 - It is learned that President Roosevelt has a program for formal devaluation of the dollar being developed for release in the near future alongside a stabilization of the modified gold currency.
- December 19 - President Roosevelt organizes the administration's national security council for acquisition of field work for various recovery agencies alongside an order for local representation for consumers in cities nationwide.
- December 20 - President Roosevelt invites all employees not regimented under a general NRA code to extend their aligning with his reemployment agreement for another four months.

== 1934 ==
- December 29 – Japan renounces the Washington Naval Treaty and the London Naval Treaty.

== 1935 ==
- September 15 – The Reichstag passes the Nuremberg Laws, introducing antisemitism in German legislation.

== 1936 ==
- March 25 – The Second London Naval Treaty is signed by the United Kingdom, United States, and France. Italy and Japan each declined to sign this treaty.
- November 3 – Elections throughout the United States are held. In the presidential election, Roosevelt defeats Republican nominee Alf Landon in a landslide. Congress likewise remains solidly Democratic, with the party expanding their majorities in the Senate and House of Representatives.

== 1937 ==
- January 20 – President Roosevelt and Vice President Garner are inaugurated a second time. This is the first presidential inauguration held after the ratification of the 20th Amendment, which moved the date of the ceremony from March 4 to January 20.

== 1938 ==
- July 6 – Évian Conference: The United States and the United Kingdom refuse to accept any more Jewish refugees.

== 1939 ==
- September 1 – World War II begins with the Invasion of Poland by Nazi Germany.

== 1940 ==
- November 5 – Reelected to a third term.
- December 29 – Arsenal of Democracy

== 1941 ==
- January 20 – Roosevelt is inaugurated a third time. Henry A. Wallace is also inaugurated vice president.
- December 7 – Japan launches a surprise attack on a US base on Pearl Harbor, killing over two thousand Americans and wounding a thousand more. Japan declares war on the United States and United Kingdom later that day (December 8 in Japan).
- December 8 – Roosevelt addresses the Pearl Harbor attack before a joint session of Congress. Soon after, Congress almost unanimously declares war on Japan.
- December 11 - Germany and Italy, Japan's allies, declare war on the US, bringing the country into World War II.

== 1942 ==
=== January ===
- January 1 - United States Secretary of War Henry L. Stimson reveals the American flag is still hanging over Manila and warns the US against viewing the ongoing conflict with Japan "thru rose colored glasses." The Departments of State and War disclose criticism of the American Navy at Pearl Harbor as a closed incident. United States Ambassador to the United Kingdom John Gilbert Winant reads a message from President Roosevelt reflecting on the prior year of 1941 during a pageant in London.
- January 2 - The War Department issues a statement saying American and Philippines troops continue combating Japanese forces in the aftermath of the Philippine capital being lost. President Roosevelt holds a press conference in Washington. President Roosevelt announces the government is studying the potential moving of vital arms plants away from danger zones on the coasts. The White House announces 26 countries have signed an agreement to combat Germany until the war's conclusion.
- January 3 - President Roosevelt spends the morning working on the budget and an annual message to congress and resumes conferences with allied leaders in the White House during the afternoon.
- January 5 - The Navy Department reveals the appointment of President Roosevelt's naval aide John R. Beardall for superintendent of the Annapolis Naval academy.
- January 6 - President Roosevelt delivers the 1942 State of the Union Address.
- January 7 - President Roosevelt announces the nomination of Laurence Steinhardt for United States Ambassador to Turkey. United States Attorney General Francis Biddle says a re-registration of enemy aliens for provisions of "tighter control" akin to the aftermath of the first World War is under consideration.
- January 9 - The Senate votes 48 to 37 to adopt an amendment for the price fixing bill. The amendment gives the United States Secretary of Agriculture veto power on raw product prices over farm prices.
- January 10 - The Senate votes 83 to 1 for the Roosevelt administration-supported price control bill.
- January 12 - The White House announces the establishment of the Joint United States-Mexican Defense commission by President Roosevelt and President of Mexico Manuel Ávila Camacho.
- January 18 - United States Secretary of Agriculture Claude R. Wickard speaks on preventing a predicted shortage of sugar, oil, and fats by the end of the year during an evening radio broadcast.
- January 19 - The Senate votes in favor of a bill authorizing the president control over telephonic systems and other wire communications during times of war exactly one month after the same bill was approved by the House on December 19 of the previous year.
- January 20 – Nazis at the Wannsee Conference in Berlin decide that the "Final Solution to the Jewish problem" is relocation, and later extermination.
- January 21 - Secretary of State Hull figures the State Department has spoken against a surprise attack in the Pacific Ocean to the US Army and Navy.
- January 22 - House and Senate conferees approve a Roosevelt administration price control bill compromise agreement. The bill sees farm prices rise by 11% and forbids the establishment of a maximum price on farm commodity without the United States Secretary of Agriculture approving. United States Secretary of the Treasury Henry Morgenthau Jr. says individuals thrown out of work are under consideration by the treasury to have their income tax payments eased through the conversion program to war production.
- January 23 - President Roosevelt says he is expecting to receive the Robert board's report on who bears responsibility for the Japanese attack on Pearl Harbor following an investigation in Hawaii during a press conference.
- January 24 - The White House announces President Roosevelt's intention to request Congress promote Generals Hugh Casey, Clinton Pierce, Arnold Funk, William Marquat, and Harold George to the brigadier general rank. The Department of Agriculture announces the operation of 18 mobile camps for the sheltering of 2,700 families of migratory farm laborers to meet farm labor standards.
- January 27 - President Roosevelt announces 6, 8, or 10 American expeditionary forces positioned at strategic fronts across the globe for the purpose of carrying American forces to a gradual victory in the war during a press conference in the afternoon. The House unanimously votes for a bill carrying 20 billions of dollars for the strengthening of the US Navy. President Roosevelt and Prime Minister Winston Churchill announce, simultaneously in Washington and London, the members composing the three boards creating a joint high command for American and British forces to better align against the Axis forces.
- January 28 - President Roosevelt approves an act authorizing a defense fund of 100 million, the act making it illegal to wear the insignias of aids of civilian defense unless authorized. United States Secretary of the Navy Frank Knox says the job of the US Navy is fighting globally against "one indivisible total enemy."
- January 29 - The White House announces President Roosevelt's second fireside chat will likely take place on February 22, the birthday of former U.S. President George Washington.
- January 30 - President Roosevelt celebrates his 60th birthday at the White House with a visit from actors and delivering a radio address expressing appreciation for those who donated to charity for infantile paralysis victims.
- January 31 - The Department of the Navy announces the establishment of the Office of Procurement and Material.

=== February ===
- February 1 - Attorney General Biddle says the government is "taking every precaution" in the prevention of fifth column activities during the evening.
- February 2 - The Senate unanimously confirms the naval appropriations bill of 26.5 billion for funding of 25,063 naval aircraft and changes to both of the ocean naval construction programs.
- February 4 - The State Department announces they have learned American, British, and Dutch consular authorities from Shanghai have been moved to the Cathay mansions from French authorities. Attorney General Biddle establishes a war frauds unit for the purpose of investigation and prosecution of complaints stemming from war production contracts.
- February 5 - United States Secretary of Labor Frances Perkins and the War Labor board hold a conference.
- February 8 - Secretary of the Interior Ickes announces a proposal from the bureau of mines for a 38 million program for prompting the use of the domestic manganese in relation to the wartime steel industry.
- February 10 - President Roosevelt announces he was made privy to his eligibility for a US$37,500 pension by a friend. President Roosevelt requests Congress submit additional funds of 5 billion 430 million for lend lease aid through June 30 of the following year.
- February 12 - First Lady of the United States Eleanor Roosevelt reports the Office of Civilian Defense is nearing completion.
- February 13 - President Roosevelt announces Congress receiving the responsibility for economy in branches of non-defense.
- February 14 - The Navy Department the secret convening of a special naval court in response to the fire which swept the SS Normandie five days prior.
- February 15 - United States Secretary of the Navy Frank Knox announces work on the Norfolk navy yard within several weeks.
- February 18 - The Navy Department announces the E. H. Blum tanker received damage two days prior on the Atlantic coast.
- February 19 - White House Press Secretary Stephen Early announces President Roosevelt has been ordered to abstain from his duties as the result of a slight cold during the evening. Secretary of the Treasury Morgenthau reports the treasury procurement division is on schedule with lend-lease supplies purchases.
- February 21 - A spokesman for the Treasury Department says the department has approval for provisions meant to protect motorists form theft of their federal automobile tax stamps.
- February 22 - The Navy Department declines commenting on allegations by Martin Agronsky broadcast the previous day in which Agronsky claimed that Java-based American troops had not been able to combat 32 Japanese bombers that had attacked.
- February 24 - President Roosevelt holds a press conference in which he says he does not want to speak on the possibility of dispatches from the Bataan peninsula indicating a dispute between General Douglas MacArthur and other commanding officers due to an admitted lack of knowledge on the event.
- February 26 - President Roosevelt increases US legations located in Bolivia, Ecuador, and Paraguay to embassy status in recognizing that all three nations severed relations with axis powers.
- February 27 - President Roosevelt denounces farm bloc senate members trying to modify a war appropriations bill to not dispose surpluses of wheat, corn, and cotton. Secretary of War Stimson announces the authorization of 10,000,000 in relief fund expenditures among the civilians in the Philippines by General Douglas MacArthur.

=== March ===
- March 1 - United States Assistant Secretary of State Adolf A. Berle identifies the United Nations' fight against those proposing to do away with the rights of men as a war for the public during an address through the Mutual Broadcasting System during the evening. United States Assistant Secretary of War John J. McCloy announces the United States Army is seeking new recruits to assist with the planned offensive by the UN for the following year and commissions will be granted mainly to men with rising in ranking.
- March 2 - President Roosevelt issues an order eliminating a large portion of the independent commands alongside creating three basic units to have authority over all phases of military action. The Navy and War Departments announce Archibald Wavell, 1st Earl Wavell has been relieved of leadership in the South and West Pacific and that command will be passed to the Dutch. Attorney General Biddle advocates for civil liberties to be watched over by attorneys in each community during an address to the house delegates of the American Bar Association.
- March 3 - Secretary of the Treasury Morgenthau says early rationing of every commodity is needed for inflation control within the US alongside announcing a 7 billion 810 million tax program.
- March 5 - President Roosevelt meets with Secretary of War Stimson, General George Marshall, Admiral Ernest King, Admiral Harold Stark, Harry Hopkins, and Henry H. Arnold before the group is joined by British members of the British-American staff during the conference in the afternoon. Secretary of War Stimson announces Java was sent material air reinforcements the previous week during a press conference.
- March 6 - President Roosevelt repudiates Oliver Lyttleton for the latter announcing American naval being present in the Eritrea red sea due to the information of its existence being of potential value to enemies during a press conference.
- March 8 - First Lady Roosevelt defends the Farm Society administration from "economy minded people" during her sponsored weekly broadcast. Secretary of Interior Ickes announces five meetings being held during the month for the hastening of domestic mineral resource mobilization.
- March 9 - Secretary of the Interior Ickes approves a plan from the industry transportation committee meant to allocate available tanker space in the movement of oil to the Atlantic coast.
- March 10 - President Roosevelt reads a letter from Dean of Harvard Law School James M. Landis that the latter meant for the president to the Federal Works Agency in regards to blacking out federal buildings amid air raids during a press conference. During the conference, Roosevelt also suggests the possibility of forming a single force through the merging of the military and naval forces, citing a possibility for a more efficient military power.
- March 11 - President Roosevelt announces Leo T. Crowley as alien property custodian, ending a struggle for control over the property between Attorney General Biddle and Secretary of the Treasury Morgenthau.
- March 12 - The State Department announces during the night that it has made objections to the Vatican on the possible creation of relations between Japan and the Holy See.
- March 13 - President Roosevelt holds a press conference in which he calls for politics to be ignored in favor of coming to the realization that the US is at war. Secretary of the Treasury Morgenthau appears before the senate finance committee in support of hastening a bill increasing the national debt limit from 65 billion to 125 billion.
- March 14 - The Navy announces twelve allied warships have sunk during the conflict to keep Japanese forces out of Java.
- March 15 - The Navy announces names of Pearl Harbor heroes who were reward honors by President Roosevelt and Secretary Knox.
- March 16 - Secretary of War Stimson announces in a War Department communique issuing that American army units are currently in Australia. President Roosevelt requests Congress approve an additional funding for the navy department for the remainder of the fiscal year.
- March 17 - President Roosevelt holds a press conference in which he speaks against a congressional movement to abolish the 40 hour work week. Roosevelt also states his intent to ask Congress the following day for an increase of seventeen and a half billion toward army warplanes.
- March 18 - Secretary of the Navy Knox says the next 60 days will see a "considerable increase in the submarine patrol fleet along the eastern coast" during a press conference in New York.
- March 19 - Secretary of War Stimson tells Congress of potentially creating legislation that would ratify the salary of Philippine soldiers to that of American service members.
- March 20 - President Roosevelt holds a press conference that during which he says a possible shortage in important skilled labor industries may be formed during the upcoming fall. President Roosevelt designates the upcoming April 6 as "Army Day" in a presidential proclamation.
- March 21 - The Navy Department announces the gunboat Asheville has been assumed lost in south of Java. Press Secretary Early says President Roosevelt is opposed to abolishing both the Civilian Conservation corps and the National Youth administration.
- March 22 - Secretary of the Treasury Morgenthau announces his intention to offer two issues of certified indebtedness at the beginning of the following month.
- March 23 - President Roosevelt announces his intention to nominate John Marston for major general.
- March 24 - President of Nicaragua Anastasio Somoza García states he has informed President Roosevelt that the forces of the US will not be of necessity in defending the Nicaraguan coasts.
- March 25 - Attorney General Biddle denounces Assistant Attorney General Arnold for his accusations that organized labor is destroying small businesses and casting both farmers and consumers "at its mercy."

=== April ===
- April 1 - The War Department reports American and Filipino raiders have succeeded in destroying Japanese military installations within Zamboanga City as well as leveled 22 warehouses of war-stock.
- April 2 - The War Production board orders a halt on producing crops meant to be containers for beer, soft drinks, catsup, jellies, and preserves be effective following the upcoming April 28.
- April 4 - The Navy announces the torpedoing of a US merchant vessel, a Norwegian cargo ship, a Latvian merchantman, and a small Canadian ship by submarines.
- April 5 - The War Production board announces it being advised of numerous labor-management committees being organized and these groups reporting "large increases in production already."
- April 6 - Secretary of the Treasury Morgenthau says the offering by the treasury of one and a half billion dollars were favorably received and he praises the performance of the security dealers.
- April 7 - The Navy Department announces the acceptance of black volunteer enlistment for in the role of reservists of general service for the branches of the navy, marine corps, and coast guard.
- April 8 - President Roosevelt designates the upcoming May 17 as "I Am An American Day". The War Production board announces a small scale conversion of drinking liquor to industrial alcohol.
- April 9 - The Department of Commerce reports an uptake of 52% in American merchandise exports from corresponding months of the previous year.
- April 10 - President Roosevelt authorizes federal offices for the inspection of factories as well as auditing privately owned armament plants books and records at any point via an executive order.
- April 11 - The War Department announces the development of jeeps that can go into water.
- April 12 - The government adds 452 individuals and firms to Latin America and European countries of neutrality.
- April 14 - President Roosevelt issues an executive order stripping United States Secretary of Commerce Jesse H. Jones of his abilities to organize materials for the war production program and transferring the ability to Vice President Wallace.
- April 15 - The Navy reports 18 ranking marine corps officers have received an advancement on the retiring list and announces General John Marston has assumed leadership of Camp Elliot in San Diego, California. Acting Secretary of State Summer Welles orders a suspension of assistance on an economic level in regards to the Vichy government.
- April 16 - The Navy reports two American ships and one Swedish ship as having been sunk by enemy submarines within the Atlantic coastal waters. President Roosevelt issues an order of reorganization of the Office of Civilian Defense for bring it closer to other war agencies and with the purpose of defining the reason behind its existence.
- April 17 - Secretary of War Stimson declares the US army as nearing being ready to go on the offensive and being able to do so upon reaching the aforementioned readiness.
- April 18 - The War Production board announces its choice to prohibit commercial laundry equipment manufacturing following June 1 and dry-cleaning machinery the following July 1.
- April 19 - The War Production board states its intent of sending questionnaires to Americans using forms of metal to gain more adept knowledge of "United States metal use and requirements."
- April 20 - The Navy Department takes over three plants of the Brewster Aeronautical corporation while acting under a presidential order. Congressional leaders report President Roosevelt not wanting anything to be done by Congress about inflation despite his distaste for it.
- April 21 - President Roosevelt announces the use of enemy patents captured being applied to assist the US during the war amid a press conference.

== 1943 ==
- January 1 - At a press conference, President Roosevelt issues a statement on the "supreme necessity" to plan for peace after World War II's conclusion and for the unity caused by the United Nations to prevent a similar conflict in the future.
- January 1 - It is reported that James F. Byrnes views that Congress should be permitted to make its own decision on new taxes.
- January 5 - Undersecretary of War Robert P. Patterson says military equipment production is a job that can only be planned by the army and cites this as the reason for his belief that the army should be the only one controlling its production.
- January 8 - President Roosevelt holds a press conference, during which stating his intent to convey a message to Congress on the hope for a United Nations victory the following year after being asked if his remarks the previous day were meant to imply his belief that the war would end in a year.
- January 8 - President Roosevelt gives authorization to a pay-as-you-go tax plan amid admitting this plan includes problems such as the uncertainty whether the government will forgive a part or all of the current taxes due.
- November 27 – The War Department releases the names of 322 US service members missing in action to the public.
- November 28 – Tehran Conference held in Tehran, Iran.

== 1944 ==
- January 9 – The War Department announces the appointment of Walter Bedell Smith to Chief of Staff for Allied Supreme Commander Dwight D. Eisenhower.
- January 10 – President Roosevelt instructs the Secretaries of Navy and War to ensure sitting members of Congress remain without serving in active service units, saying in a formal statement that he had been advised by United States Attorney General Francis Biddle that concurrent service in the military and Congress was forbidden by the Constitution.
- February 23 – President Roosevelt orders Secretary of War Stimson to seize control of the municipal water and power department in Los Angeles.
- February 23 – Acting Secretary of State Edward Stettinius Jr. says the US hopes Finland will get out of World War II during a press conference.
- June 6 – D-Day commences.
- November 7 – Reelected to a fourth term.

== 1945 ==
- January 20 – Fourth inauguration of Franklin D. Roosevelt
- February 4 – Yalta Conference held near Yalta, Crimea.
- April 12 – Roosevelt dies. Harry S. Truman becomes the 33rd president of the United States.

== See also ==
- Timeline of the Herbert Hoover presidency, for his predecessor
- Timeline of the Harry S. Truman presidency, for his successor
