= 1930 State of the Union Address =

Speech by US President Herbert Hoover

- Date: December 2, 1930
- Venue: House Chamber, United States Capitol
- Location: Washington, D.C.
- Type: State of the Union Address
- Participants: Herbert Hoover; Charles Curtis; Nicholas Longworth
- Format: Written
- Previous: 1929 State of the Union Address
- Next: 1931 State of the Union Address

The 1930 State of the Union Address was delivered by President Herbert Hoover on December 2, 1930, in the second year of his presidency and during the early stages of the Great Depression. Hoover focused on the government's response to the economic crisis, which included promoting voluntary cooperation between businesses, labor, and government to avoid mass unemployment and wage cuts. He reported that many businesses had maintained wages, which helped preserve the country’s buying power.

Hoover highlighted the administration’s efforts to encourage businesses to maintain wages and prevent mass layoffs, stating, "In a large sense these undertakings have been adhered to, and we have not witnessed the usual reductions of wages which have always heretofore marked depressions." He pointed out that maintaining wages had helped preserve the buying power of the country and minimize industrial strife.

Hoover also praised the expansion of public works programs as a key part of the government's response to rising unemployment, noting that the "expansion of public construction... has resulted in the expansion of public construction to an amount even above that in the most prosperous years." He highlighted how federal, state, and local governments, as well as private industries, were contributing to construction and betterment projects, which helped to absorb some of the workforce affected by the economic downturn.

Internationally, Hoover addressed the global nature of the economic depression, attributing part of the crisis to overproduction of key commodities, political instability, and economic struggles in other nations. He expressed optimism that the U.S., with its strong resources and self-sustaining economy, would "lead the march of prosperity" once the global economy recovered.

Preceded by 1929 State of the Union Address	State of the Union addresses 1930	Succeeded by 1931 State of the Union Address
