= 1932 State of the Union Address =

Speech by US President Herbert Hoover

- Date: December 6, 1932
- Venue: House Chamber, United States Capitol
- Location: Washington, D.C.
- Type: State of the Union Address
- Participants: Herbert Hoover; Charles Curtis; John Nance Garner
- Format: Written
- Previous: 1931 State of the Union Address
- Next: 1934 State of the Union Address

The 1932 State of the Union Address was delivered by President Herbert Hoover on December 6, 1932. As Hoover's final State of the Union Address, it came at the height of the Great Depression and during the transition period following his loss to Franklin D. Roosevelt in the 1932 presidential election.

Hoover's speech reflected the deep economic crisis the country was facing, with unemployment reaching unprecedented levels and widespread poverty. He defended his administration's efforts to combat the Depression, stating, "The result of the agencies we have created and the policies we have pursued has been to buttress our whole domestic financial structure and greatly to restore credit facilities." Hoover emphasized the importance of maintaining individual responsibility and limiting the role of government intervention, contrasting his views with Roosevelt's more interventionist policies.

The address included a call for continued measures to stabilize the banking system and ensure fiscal responsibility. Hoover warned against the dangers of excessive government spending, asserting that recovery "can not be permanently accomplished by artificialities."

Preceded by 1931 State of the Union Address	State of the Union addresses 1932	Succeeded by 1934 State of the Union Address
