= 1928 State of the Union Address =

Speech by US President Calvin Coolidge

- Date: December 4, 1928
- Venue: House Chamber, United States Capitol
- Location: Washington, D.C.; 38°53′23″N 77°00′32″W
- Type: State of the Union Address
- Participants: Calvin Coolidge; Charles G. Dawes; Nicholas Longworth
- Format: Written
- Previous: 1927 State of the Union Address
- Next: 1929 State of the Union Address

The 1928 State of the Union Address was given by the 30th president of the United States, Calvin Coolidge, to a joint session of the 70th United States Congress on December 4, 1928. Delivered at a time of economic prosperity and international peace, Coolidge's message highlighted the nation's growing wealth, peaceful international relations, and efforts to improve efficiency in both government and industry.

Coolidge described the state of the Union as being more favorable than at any previous time, with "tranquility and contentment" marking the domestic sphere. He noted that industrial relations were harmonious and that the nation's economy had moved beyond mere necessities into the "region of luxury."

In foreign affairs, Coolidge pointed to the success of the Kellogg-Briand Pact, an international treaty renouncing war as a means of resolving disputes. He described it as a "solemn declaration against war" and a major step towards a peaceful global order. He also discussed the United States' role in facilitating peace in Latin America and Europe, particularly through negotiations with Nicaragua and support for resolving tensions between Chile and Peru.

The address also emphasized fiscal conservatism, with Coolidge explaining that tax cuts and reductions in government spending had stimulated economic growth. He proudly noted that one-third of the national debt had been paid off, and government revenues had continued to grow despite repeated tax cuts.

Coolidge concluded by calling for continued fiscal responsibility, warning that new spending without revenue to support it would lead to an unbalanced budget for the first time in his administration.

Preceded by 1927 State of the Union Address	State of the Union addresses 1928	Succeeded by 1929 State of the Union Address
