= 1927 State of the Union Address =

Speech by US President Calvin Coolidge

- Date: December 6, 1927
- Venue: House Chamber, United States Capitol
- Location: Washington, D.C.; 38°53′23″N 77°00′32″W
- Type: State of the Union Address
- Participants: Calvin Coolidge; Charles G. Dawes; Nicholas Longworth
- Format: Written
- Previous: 1926 State of the Union Address
- Next: 1928 State of the Union Address

The 1927 State of the Union Address was given on Tuesday, December 6, 1927. It was given by Calvin Coolidge, the 30th president of the United States, to the 70th United States Congress. He said, "For many years the Federal Government has been building a system of dikes along the Mississippi River for protection against high water. During the past season the lower States were overcome by a most disastrous flood. Many thousands of square miles were inundated a great many lives were lost, much livestock was drowned, and a very heavy destruction of property was inflicted upon the inhabitants." He talks about controlling and preventing floods.

Notably the President mentions the rapid growth of the aeronautics industry and more road buildings in the Americas which he said was discussed at the Pan American Congress. In addition, the President discussed the Indian Citizenship Act which was passed in 1924, granting citizenship rights to all Native Americans.

In foreign affairs, the President said that the Panama Canal processed a record amount with a $80,000,000 surplus.

Preceded by 1926 State of the Union Address	State of the Union addresses 1927	Succeeded by 1928 State of the Union Address
