= Karin Rådström =

Swedish engineer and business executive

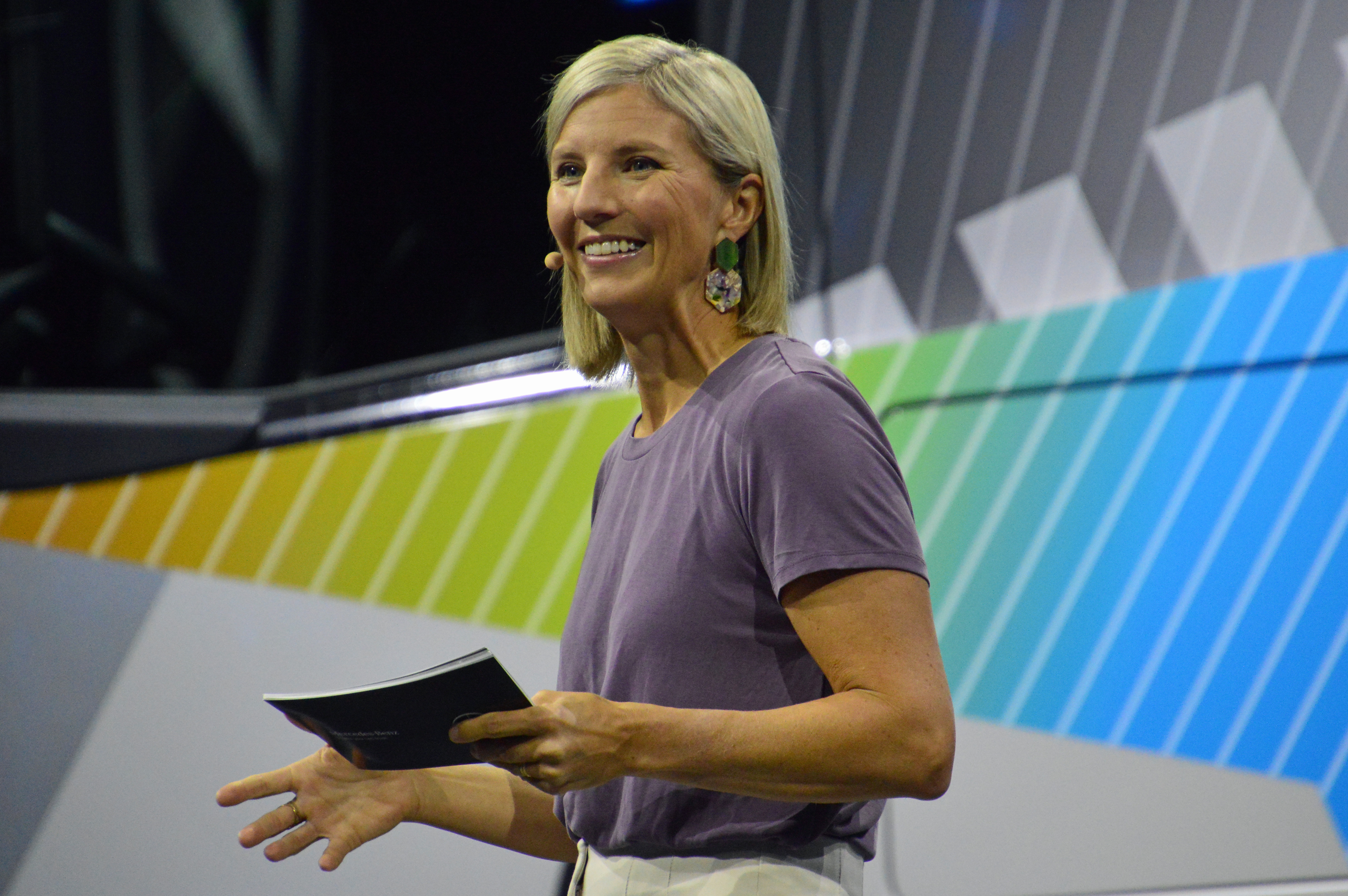
- Born: 22 February 1979 (age 47); Södertälje, Sweden
- Occupations: Engineer; business executive
- Spouse: Daniel Rådström
- Children: 2

Karin Elisabeth Rådström (born 22 February 1979) is a Swedish engineer and business executive in the commercial vehicle segment. She has been a member of the Board of Management of Daimler Truck since February 2021 and has been responsible for the Mercedes-Benz truck brand there since May.

== Career ==
Rådström was born in Södertälje and grew up in Nynäshamn and for seven years in Toronto, Ontario, Canada. She first studied at Queen's University at Kingston for a year and then as a civil engineer in Industrial Engineering and Sustainability at the KTH Royal Institute of Technology in Stockholm and then became a trainee at Scania in Södertälje in 2004. After various positions in the company, she became Director of Pre Sales & Marketing Communication in Kenya and in 2016, head of Scania Bus Business. In 2019, Radström was appointed to the Board of Management for Sales and Marketing.

In 2021, she became a member of Daimler Truck AG's management team (Vorstandsmitglied der Daimler Truck AG) of seven people, with responsibility for the regions of Europe and Latin America and for Daimler's Mercedes-Benz trucks. On 1 October 2024, she became CEO (Vorstandsvorsitzende) of Daimler Truck. She is only the second woman to lead an enterprise among those in the German DAX stock index.

== Personal life ==
During the latter part of the 2000s, Rådström was an elite athlete in rowing, with three years in the national team. She is married to Daniel Rådström and has two children.
