= 1926 State of the Union Address =

Speech by US President Calvin Coolidge

- Date: December 6, 1926
- Venue: House Chamber, United States Capitol
- Location: Washington, D.C.; 38°53′23″N 77°00′32″W
- Type: State of the Union Address
- Participants: Calvin Coolidge; Charles G. Dawes; Nicholas Longworth
- Format: Written
- Previous: 1925 State of the Union Address
- Next: 1927 State of the Union Address

The 1926 State of the Union Address was given by Calvin Coolidge, the 30th United States President, on Monday, December 6, 1926, to the United States House of Representatives, and the United States Senate. It was his fourth State of the Union Address and was delivered to the Congress in written format.

On the matter of the welfare of the middle class the President said,

In the industries the condition of the wage earner has steadily improved. The 12-hour day is almost entirely unknown. Skilled labor is well compensated. But there are unfortunately a multitude of workers who have not yet come to share in the general prosperity of the Nation. Both the public authorities and private enterprise should be solicitous to advance the welfare of this class. The Federal Government has been seeking to secure this end through a protective tariff, through restrictive immigration, through requiring safety devices for the prevention of accidents, through the granting of workman's compensation, through civilian vocational rehabilitation and education, through employment information bureaus, and through such humanitarian relief as was provided in the maternity and infancy legislation. It is a satisfaction to report that a more general condition of contentment exists among wage earners and the country is more free from labor disputes than it has been for years. While restrictive immigration has been adopted in part for the benefit of the wage earner, and in its entirety for the benefit of the country, it ought not to cause a needless separation of families and dependents from their natural source of support contrary to the dictates of humanity.

== Basic quotes ==
- "The social well-being of our country requires our constant effort for the amelioration of race prejudice and the extension to all elements of equal opportunity and equal protection under the laws which are guaranteed by the Constitution. The Federal Government especially is charged with this obligation in behalf of the colored people of the Nation. Not only their remarkable progress, their devotion and their loyalty, but, our duty to ourselves under our claim that we are an enlightened people requires us to use all our power to protect them from the crime of lynching."
- We need ideals that can be followed in daily life, that can be translated into terms of the home. We can not expect to be relieved from toil, but we do expect to divest it of degrading conditions. Work is honorable; it is entitled to an honorable recompense. We must strive mightily, but having striven there is a defect in our political and social system if we are not in general rewarded with success.
- To relieve the land of the burdens that came from the war, to release to the individual more of the fruits of his own industry, to increase his earning capacity and decrease his hours of labor, to enlarge the circle of his vision through good roads and better transportation, to lace before him the opportunity for education both in science and in art, to leave him free to receive the inspiration of religion, all these are ideals which deliver him from the servitude of the body and exalt him to the service of the soul. Through this emancipation from the things that are material, we broaden our dominion over the things that are spiritual.

Preceded by 1925 State of the Union Address	State of the Union addresses 1926	Succeeded by 1927 State of the Union Address
