= 1931 State of the Union Address =

Speech by US President Herbert Hoover

- Date: December 8, 1931
- Venue: House Chamber, United States Capitol
- Location: Washington, D.C.
- Type: State of the Union Address
- Participants: Herbert Hoover; Charles Curtis; John Nance Garner
- Format: Written
- Previous: 1930 State of the Union Address
- Next: 1932 State of the Union Address

The 1931 State of the Union Address was delivered by President Herbert Hoover on December 8, 1931, in the midst of the Great Depression. Hoover's third address to Congress focused on efforts to address the ongoing economic crisis through both government and private sector initiatives, with an emphasis on cooperation and limited government intervention.

Hoover highlighted the administration's response to the unemployment crisis, which included expanding public works programs and encouraging private industries to share available work among employees. He noted, "There has been the least possible Government entry into the economic field," as he remained committed to encouraging local and community efforts in addressing the Depression's effects.

Internationally, Hoover discussed the European economic crisis, particularly the situation in Germany. The U.S. facilitated a one-year postponement of reparations payments to prevent further financial collapse, which threatened global stability. Hoover also touched on foreign policy, expressing concern about the escalating conflict between China and Japan and reiterating U.S. support for the Kellogg-Briand Pact and China's territorial integrity.

Domestically, Hoover underscored efforts to assist agriculture, including loans to drought-affected farmers and relief provided by the Red Cross. He praised the spirit of community responsibility, stating, "Our people have been protected from hunger and cold," and commended the public's response to the crisis, which helped avert widespread unrest and industrial conflict.

Preceded by 1930 State of the Union Address	State of the Union addresses 1931	Succeeded by 1932 State of the Union Address
