= Lucette Rådström =

Swedish journalist and television presenter

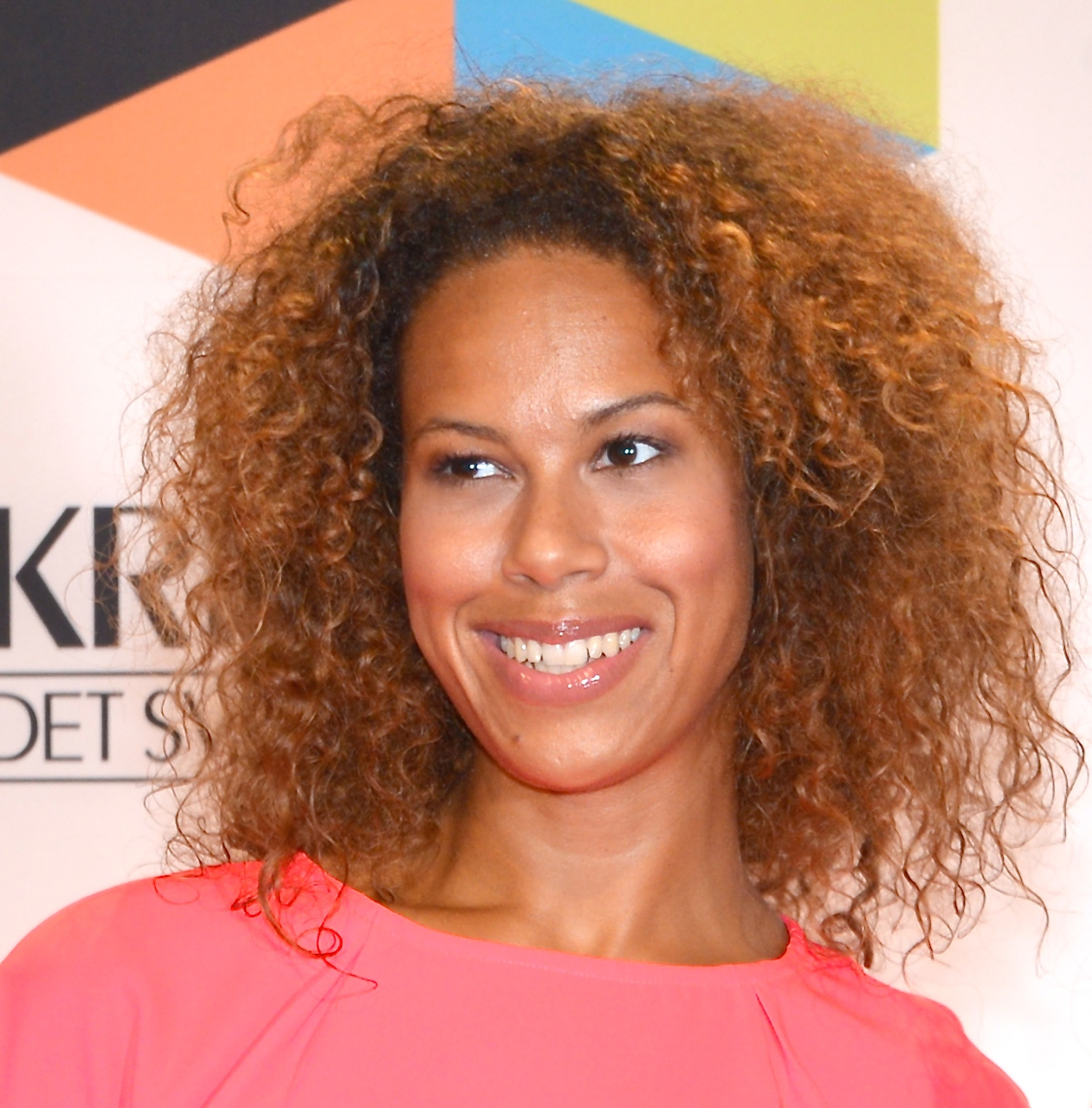
- Lucette Rådström (2013)
- Born: 3 December 1974 (age 51); Sweden
- Occupation: Television presenter

Maria Lucette Rådström (born 3 December 1974) is a Swedish journalist and television presenter. She has worked for TV4 since 1998, she started her career at ZTV as a presenter for Efter plugget along with Mårten Andersson between 1997 and 1998. She has presented the New Year's Eve celebrations at TV4 along with Rickard Sjöberg in 1998, and Josefin Crafoord in 2005. In 1999, Rådström participated as a "tracking dog" in the game show På rymmen along with Hasse Aro.

Lucette Rådström has also presented the kids show Lattjo Lajban on TV4 with Tobbe Blom, and in 2002 she competed in Gladiatorerna in a special celebrity edition.
