= 1929 State of the Union Address =

Speech by US President Herbert Hoover

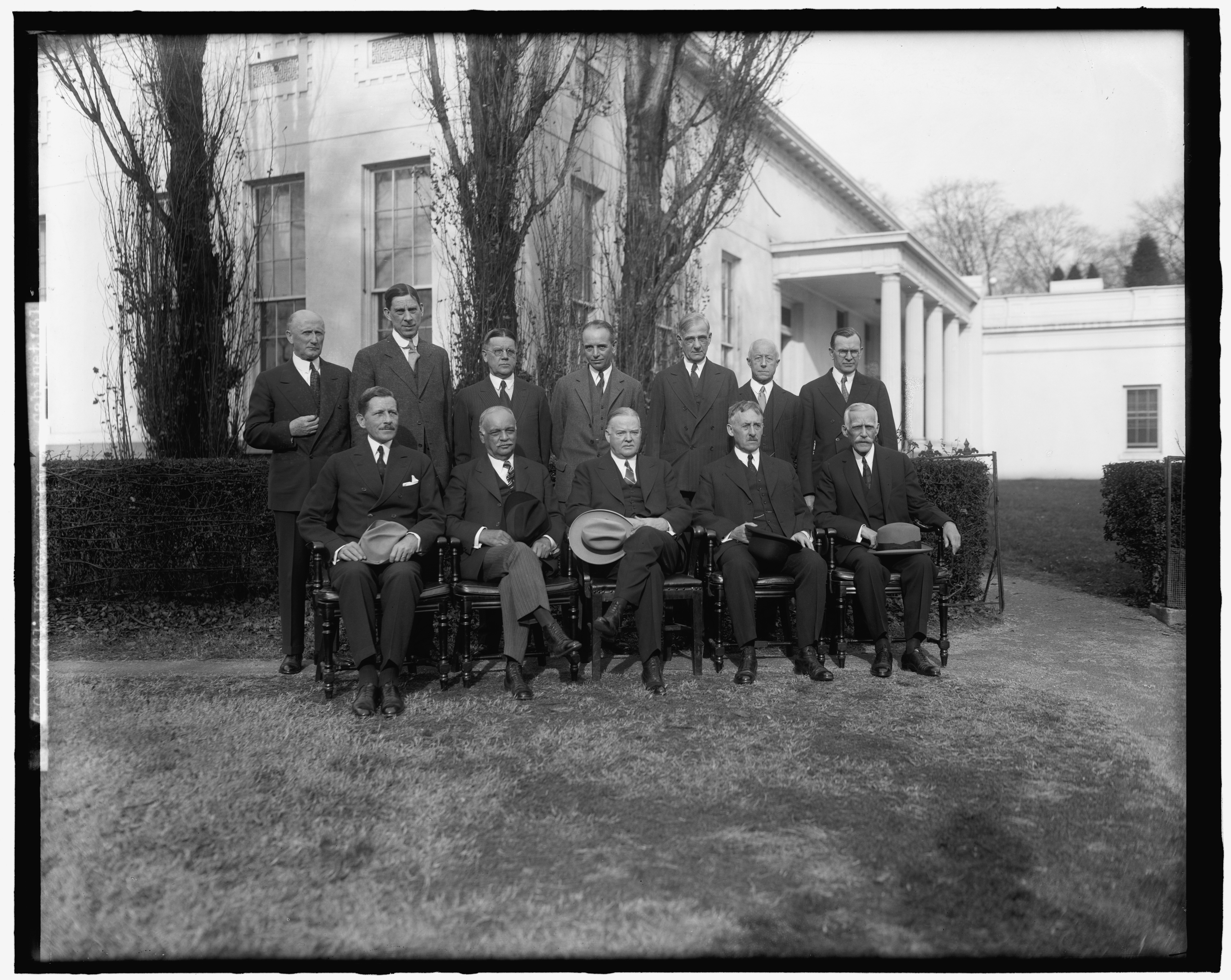
- President Hoover with Cabinet (1929)
- Date: December 3, 1929
- Venue: House Chamber, United States Capitol
- Location: Washington, D.C.
- Type: State of the Union Address
- Participants: Herbert Hoover; Charles Curtis; Nicholas Longworth
- Format: Written
- Previous: 1928 State of the Union Address
- Next: 1930 State of the Union Address

The 1929 State of the Union Address was sent as a written message by Herbert Hoover, the 31st United States President on Tuesday, December 3, 1929, to both houses of the 71st United States Congress. This was Hoover's first State of the Union message, and the 1929 stock market crash had just begun. He said,

- "The test of the rightfulness of our decisions must be whether we have sustained and advanced the ideals of the American people; self-government in its foundations of local government; justice whether to the individual or to the group; ordered liberty; freedom from domination; open opportunity and equality of opportunity; the initiative and individuality of our people; prosperity and the lessening of poverty; freedom of public opinion; education; advancement of knowledge; the growth of religious spirit; the tolerance of all faiths; the foundations of the home and the advancement of peace."

From a foreign relations standpoint, the President noted that the Kellogg-Briand pact was a great advancement in foreign diplomacy and abatement of wars. The President also mentioned the advancement of the Hoover Dam project.

Preceded by 1928 State of the Union Address	State of the Union addresses 1929	Succeeded by 1930 State of the Union Address
