= List of joint sessions of the United States Congress =

As of April 2026, there have been 469 joint sessions and joint meetings of the United States Congress.

The record for the most addresses to Congress by a single foreign leader is held by Israeli prime minister Benjamin Netanyahu, who has delivered four addresses.

== 1780s ==
Congress	Date	Type	Occasion	Dignitary speaking
1st	April 6, 1789	Joint session	Counting electoral votes for the 1789 presidential election	None
1st	April 30, 1789	Joint session	Inauguration of George Washington and church service	George Washington, President of the United States; Samuel Provoost, Chaplain of the Senate

== 1790s ==
Congress	Date	Type	Occasion	Dignitary speaking
1st	January 8, 1790	Joint session	State of the Union address	George Washington, President of the United States
1st	December 8, 1790	Joint session	State of the Union address	George Washington, President of the United States
2nd	October 25, 1791	Joint session	State of the Union address	George Washington, President of the United States
2nd	November 6, 1792	Joint session	State of the Union address	George Washington, President of the United States
2nd	February 13, 1793	Joint session	Counting electoral votes for the 1792 presidential election	None
3rd	March 4, 1793	Inauguration	Inauguration of George Washington	George Washington, President of the United States
3rd	December 3, 1793	Joint session	State of the Union address	George Washington, President of the United States
3rd	November 19, 1794	Joint session	State of the Union address	George Washington, President of the United States
4th	December 8, 1795	Joint session	State of the Union address	George Washington, President of the United States
4th	December 7, 1796	Joint session	State of the Union address	George Washington, President of the United States
4th	February 8, 1797	Joint session	Counting electoral votes for the 1796 presidential election	None
5th	March 4, 1797	Inauguration	Inauguration of John Adams	John Adams, President of the United States
5th	May 16, 1797	Joint session	Discussing relations with France	John Adams, President of the United States
5th	November 23, 1797	Joint session	State of the Union address	John Adams, President of the United States
5th	December 8, 1798	Joint session	State of the Union address	John Adams, President of the United States
6th	December 3, 1799	Joint session	State of the Union address	John Adams, President of the United States
6th	December 26, 1799	Joint session	Funeral of George Washington	Henry Lee III, U.S. Representative

== 1800s ==
Congress	Date	Type	Occasion	Dignitary speaking
6th	November 22, 1800	Joint session	State of the Union address	John Adams, President of the United States
6th	February 11, 1801	Joint session	Counting electoral votes for the 1800 presidential election	None
7th	March 4, 1801	Inauguration	Inauguration of Thomas Jefferson	Thomas Jefferson, President of the United States
8th	February 13, 1805	Joint session	Counting electoral votes for the 1804 presidential election	None
9th	March 5, 1805	Inauguration	Inauguration of Thomas Jefferson	Thomas Jefferson, President of the United States
10th	February 8, 1809	Joint session	Counting electoral votes for the 1808 presidential election	None
11th	March 4, 1809	Inauguration	Inauguration of James Madison	James Madison, President of the United States

== 1810s ==
Congress	Date	Type	Occasion	Dignitary speaking
12th	February 10, 1813	Joint session	Counting electoral votes for the 1812 presidential election	None
13th	March 4, 1813	Inauguration	Inauguration of James Madison	James Madison, President of the United States
14th	February 12, 1817	Joint session	Counting electoral votes for the 1816 presidential election	None
15th	March 4, 1817	Inauguration	Inauguration of James Monroe	James Monroe, President of the United States

== 1820s ==
Congress	Date	Type	Occasion	Dignitary speaking
16th	February 14, 1821	Joint session	Counting electoral votes for the 1820 presidential election	None
17th	March 5, 1821	Inauguration	Inauguration of James Monroe	James Monroe, President of the United States
18th	December 10, 1824	House address (this was a speech to the House, but several Senators were present as guests of the House; not a joint meeting)	Message from Lafayette	Henry Clay, Speaker of the House; Gilbert du Motier, marquis de Lafayette, French General
18th	February 9, 1825	Joint session	Counting electoral votes for the 1824 presidential election	None
19th	March 4, 1825	Inauguration	Inauguration of John Quincy Adams	John Quincy Adams, President of the United States
20th	February 11, 1829	Joint session	Counting electoral votes for the 1828 presidential election	None
21st	March 4, 1829	Inauguration	Inauguration of Andrew Jackson	Andrew Jackson, President of the United States

== 1830s ==
Congress	Date	Type	Occasion	Dignitary speaking
22nd	February 13, 1833	Joint session	Counting electoral votes for the 1832 presidential election	None
23rd	March 4, 1833	Inauguration	Inauguration of Andrew Jackson	Andrew Jackson, President of the United States
23rd	December 31, 1834	Joint session	Eulogy of Lafayette	John Quincy Adams, U.S. Representative; Also attended by Andrew Jackson, President of the United States
24th	February 8, 1837	Joint session	Counting electoral votes for the 1836 presidential election	None
25th	March 4, 1837	Inauguration	Inauguration of Martin Van Buren	Martin Van Buren, President of the United States

== 1840s ==
Congress	Date	Type	Occasion	Dignitary speaking
26th	February 10, 1841	Joint session	Counting electoral votes for the 1840 presidential election	None
27th	March 4, 1841	Inauguration	Inauguration of William Henry Harrison	William Henry Harrison, President of the United States
28th	February 12, 1845	Joint session	Counting electoral votes for the 1844 presidential election	None
29th	March 4, 1845	Inauguration	Inauguration of James K. Polk	James K. Polk, President of the United States
30th	February 14, 1849	Joint session	Counting electoral votes for the 1848 presidential election	None
31st	March 5, 1849	Inauguration	Inauguration of Zachary Taylor	Zachary Taylor, President of the United States

== 1850s ==
Congress	Date	Type	Occasion	Dignitary speaking
31st	July 10, 1850	Joint session	Inauguration of Millard Fillmore	None
32nd	January 7, 1852	Joint session	Former leader of revolutionary Hungary (1848–1849), Lajos Kossuth (in exile), appeals to US Congress to help Hungary and other nations in their struggle against European (neo-)absolutism	Lajos Kossuth
32nd	February 9, 1853	Joint session	Counting electoral votes for the 1852 presidential election	None
33rd	March 4, 1853	Inauguration	Inauguration of Franklin Pierce	Franklin Pierce, President of the United States
34th	February 11, 1857	Joint session	Counting electoral votes for the 1856 presidential election	None
35th	March 4, 1857	Inauguration	Inauguration of James Buchanan	James Buchanan, President of the United States

== 1860s ==
Congress	Date	Type	Occasion	Dignitary speaking
36th	February 13, 1861	Joint session	Counting electoral votes for the 1860 presidential election	None
37th	March 4, 1861	Inauguration	Inauguration of Abraham Lincoln	Abraham Lincoln, President of the United States
37th	February 22, 1862	Joint session	Reading of Washington's Farewell Address	John Weiss Forney, Secretary of the Senate
38th	February 8, 1865	Joint session	Counting electoral votes for the 1864 presidential election	None
39th	March 4, 1865	Inauguration	Inauguration of Abraham Lincoln	Abraham Lincoln, President of the United States
39th	February 12, 1866	Joint session	Memorial for Lincoln	George Bancroft, Historian; Also attended by Andrew Johnson, President of the United States
40th	February 10, 1869	Joint session	Counting electoral votes for the 1868 presidential election	None
41st	March 4, 1869	Inauguration	Inauguration of Ulysses S. Grant	Ulysses S. Grant, President of the United States

== 1870s ==
Congress	Date	Type	Occasion	Dignitary speaking
42nd	February 12, 1873	Joint session	Counting electoral votes for the 1872 presidential election	None
43rd	March 4, 1873	Inauguration	Inauguration of Ulysses S. Grant	Ulysses S. Grant, President of the United States
43rd	December 18, 1874	Joint session	Reception of King Kalakaua	James G. Blaine, Speaker of the House; Kalakaua, King of Hawaii
44th	February 1, 1877	Joint session	Counting electoral votes for the 1876 presidential election	None
44th	February 10, 1877	Joint session	Counting electoral votes for the 1876 presidential election	None
44th	February 12, 1877	Joint session	Counting electoral votes for the 1876 presidential election	None
44th	February 19, 1877	Joint session	Counting electoral votes for the 1876 presidential election	None
44th	February 20, 1877	Joint session	Counting electoral votes for the 1876 presidential election	None
44th	February 21, 1877	Joint session	Counting electoral votes for the 1876 presidential election	None
44th	February 24, 1877	Joint session	Counting electoral votes for the 1876 presidential election	None
44th	February 26, 1877	Joint session	Counting electoral votes for the 1876 presidential election	None
44th	February 28, 1877	Joint session	Counting electoral votes for the 1876 presidential election	None
44th	March 1, 1877	Joint session	Counting electoral votes for the 1876 presidential election	None
44th	March 2, 1877	Joint session	Counting electoral votes for the 1876 presidential election	None
45th	March 5, 1877	Inauguration	Inauguration of Rutherford B. Hayes	Rutherford B. Hayes, President of the United States

== 1880s ==
Congress	Date	Type	Occasion	Dignitary speaking
46th	February 9, 1881	Joint session	Counting electoral votes for the 1880 presidential election	None
47th	March 4, 1881	Inauguration	Inauguration of James A. Garfield	James A. Garfield, President of the United States
47th	February 27, 1882	Joint session	Memorial to Garfield	James G. Blaine, Former Secretary of State; Also attended by Chester A. Arthur, President of the United States
48th	February 11, 1885	Joint session	Count electoral votes for the 1884 presidential election	None
48th	February 21, 1885	Joint session	Completion of Washington Monument	John Davis Long, U.S. Representative; John W. Daniel, U.S. Representative-elect; Also attended by Chester A. Arthur, President of the United States
49th	March 4, 1885	Inauguration	Inauguration of Grover Cleveland	Grover Cleveland, President of the United States
50th	February 13, 1889	Joint session	Counting electoral votes for the 1888 presidential election	None
51st	March 4, 1889	Inauguration	Inauguration of Benjamin Harrison	Benjamin Harrison, President of the United States
51st	December 11, 1889	Joint session	Centennial of Washington's first inauguration	Melville Fuller, Chief Justice of the United States; Also attended by Benjamin Harrison, President of the United States

== 1890s ==
Congress	Date	Type	Occasion	Dignitary speaking
52nd	February 8, 1893	Joint session	Counting electoral votes for the 1892 presidential election	None
53rd	March 4, 1893	Inauguration	Inauguration of Grover Cleveland	Grover Cleveland, President of the United States
54th	February 10, 1897	Joint session	Counting electoral votes for the 1896 presidential election	None
55th	March 4, 1897	Inauguration	Inauguration of William McKinley	William McKinley, President of the United States

== 1900s ==
Congress	Date	Type	Occasion	Dignitary speaking
56th	December 12, 1900	Joint meeting	Centennial of Washington, D.C.	James D. Richardson, U.S. Representative; Sereno E. Payne, U.S. Representative; George Frisbie Hoar, U.S. Senator; Also attended by William McKinley, President of the United States
56th	February 13, 1901	Joint session	Counting electoral votes for the 1900 presidential election	None
57th	March 4, 1901	Inauguration	Inauguration of William McKinley	William McKinley, President of the United States
57th	February 27, 1902	Joint session	Memorial to McKinley	John Hay, Secretary of State; Also attended by Theodore Roosevelt, President of the United States and Prince Heinrich of Prussia
58th	February 8, 1905	Joint session	Counting electoral votes for the 1904 presidential election	None
59th	March 4, 1905	Inauguration	Inauguration of Theodore Roosevelt	Theodore Roosevelt, President of the United States
60th	February 10, 1909	Joint session	Counting electoral votes for the 1908 presidential election	None
61st	March 4, 1909	Inauguration	Inauguration of William Howard Taft	William Howard Taft, President of the United States

== 1910s ==
Congress	Date	Type	Occasion	Dignitary speaking
62nd	February 12, 1913	Joint session	Counting electoral votes for the 1912 presidential election	None
62nd	February 15, 1913	Joint session	Memorial for James S. Sherman	Elihu Root, U.S. Senator; Thomas S. Martin, U.S. Senator; Jacob Harold Gallinger, U.S. Senator; John Thornton, U.S. Senator; Henry Cabot Lodge, U.S. Senator; John W. Kern, U.S. Senator; Robert M. La Follette, Sr., U.S. Senator; John Sharp Williams, U.S. Senator; Charles Curtis, U.S. Senator; Albert B. Cummins, U.S. Senator; George T. Oliver, U.S. Senator; James Aloysius O'Gorman, U.S. Senator; Champ Clark, Speaker of the House; William Howard Taft, President of the United States
63rd	March 4, 1913	Inauguration	Inauguration of Woodrow Wilson	Woodrow Wilson, President of the United States
63rd	April 8, 1913	Joint session	Tariff message	Woodrow Wilson, President of the United States
63rd	June 23, 1913	Joint session	Currency and banking reform message	Woodrow Wilson, President of the United States
63rd	August 27, 1913	Joint session	Discussing Mexican affairs	Woodrow Wilson, President of the United States
63rd	December 2, 1913	Joint session	State of the Union address	Woodrow Wilson, President of the United States
63rd	January 20, 1914	Joint session	Trusts and monopolies message	Woodrow Wilson, President of the United States
63rd	March 5, 1914	Joint session	Panama Canal tolls	Woodrow Wilson, President of the United States
63rd	April 20, 1914	Joint session	Discussing the Tampico Affair	Woodrow Wilson, President of the United States
63rd	September 4, 1914	Joint session	War tax message	Woodrow Wilson, President of the United States
63rd	December 8, 1914	Joint session	State of the Union address	Woodrow Wilson, President of the United States
64th	December 7, 1915	Joint session	State of the Union address	Woodrow Wilson, President of the United States
64th	August 29, 1916	Joint session	Demands for railroad employees message	Woodrow Wilson, President of the United States
64th	December 5, 1916	Joint session	State of the Union address	Woodrow Wilson, President of the United States
64th	February 3, 1917	Joint session	Announcing break of relations with Germany	Woodrow Wilson, President of the United States
64th	February 14, 1917	Joint session	Counting electoral votes for the 1916 presidential election	None
64th	February 26, 1917	Joint session	Arming merchant ships	Woodrow Wilson, President of the United States
65th	March 5, 1917	Inauguration	Inauguration of Woodrow Wilson	Woodrow Wilson, President of the United States
65th	April 2, 1917	Joint session	U.S. entry into World War I	Woodrow Wilson, President of the United States
65th	December 4, 1917	Joint session	State of the Union address and war with Austria-Hungary	Woodrow Wilson, President of the United States
65th	January 4, 1918	Joint session	Federal operation of railways	Woodrow Wilson, President of the United States
65th	January 8, 1918	Joint session	Fourteen Points speech	Woodrow Wilson, President of the United States
65th	February 11, 1918	Joint session	Peace message	Woodrow Wilson, President of the United States
65th	May 27, 1918	Joint session	War finance message	Woodrow Wilson, President of the United States
65th	November 11, 1918	Joint session	Discussing Armistice with Germany	Woodrow Wilson, President of the United States
65th	December 2, 1918	Joint session	State of the Union address	Woodrow Wilson, President of the United States
65th	February 9, 1919	Joint session	Memorial to Theodore Roosevelt	Henry Cabot Lodge, U.S. Senator; Also attended by William Howard Taft, Former President of the United States
66th	August 8, 1919	Joint session	Cost of living message	Woodrow Wilson, President of the United States
66th	September 18, 1919	Joint session	Address	Albert B. Cummins, President pro tempore of the Senate; Frederick H. Gillett, Speaker of the House; Champ Clark, U.S. Representative; John J. Pershing, General

== 1920s ==
Congress	Date	Type	Occasion	Dignitary speaking
66th	February 9, 1921	Joint session	Counting electoral votes for the 1920 presidential election	None
67th	March 4, 1921	Inauguration	Inauguration of Warren G. Harding	Warren G. Harding, President of the United States
67th	April 12, 1921	Joint session	Federal problem message	Warren G. Harding, President of the United States
67th	December 6, 1921	Joint session	State of the Union address	Warren G. Harding, President of the United States
67th	February 28, 1922	Joint session	Maintenance of the merchant marine	Warren G. Harding, President of the United States
67th	August 18, 1922	Joint session	Coal and railroad message	Warren G. Harding, President of the United States
67th	November 21, 1922	Joint session	Promotion of the American Merchant Marine	Warren G. Harding, President of the United States
67th	December 8, 1922	Joint session	State of the Union address	Warren G. Harding, President of the United States
67th	February 7, 1923	Joint session	Discussing the British debt to the United States	Warren G. Harding, President of the United States
68th	December 6, 1923	Joint session	State of the Union address	Calvin Coolidge, President of the United States
68th	February 27, 1924	Joint session	Memorial to Warren G. Harding	Charles Evans Hughes, Secretary of State; Also attended by Calvin Coolidge, President of the United States
68th	December 15, 1924	Joint session	Memorial to Woodrow Wilson	Edwin Alderman, President of the University of Virginia; Also attended by Calvin Coolidge, President of the United States
68th	February 11, 1925	Joint session	Counting electoral votes for the 1924 presidential election	None
69th	March 4, 1925	Inauguration	Inauguration of Calvin Coolidge	Calvin Coolidge, President of the United States
69th	February 22, 1927	Joint session	Washington's Birthday message	Calvin Coolidge, President of the United States
70th	February 13, 1929	Joint session	Counting electoral votes for the 1928 presidential election	None
71st	March 4, 1929	Inauguration	Inauguration of Herbert Hoover	Herbert Hoover, President of the United States

== 1930s ==
Congress	Date	Type	Occasion	Dignitary speaking
72nd	February 22, 1932	Joint session	Bicentennial of George Washington's birthday	Herbert Hoover, President of the United States
72nd	February 6, 1933	Joint meeting	Memorial to Calvin Coolidge	Arthur Prentice Rugg, Chief Justice of the Massachusetts Supreme Judicial Court; Also attended by Herbert Hoover, President of the United States
72nd	February 8, 1933	Joint session	Counting electoral votes for the 1932 presidential election	None
73rd	March 4, 1933	Inauguration	Inauguration of Franklin D. Roosevelt	Franklin D. Roosevelt, President of the United States
73rd	January 3, 1934	Joint session	State of the Union address	Franklin D. Roosevelt, President of the United States
73rd	May 20, 1934	Joint session	100th anniversary of Lafayette's death	André Lefebvre de La Boulaye, French ambassador to the United States; Franklin D. Roosevelt, President of the United States; Also attended by Count de Chambrun, Great-grandson of Lafayette
74th	January 4, 1935	Joint session	State of the Union address	Franklin D. Roosevelt, President of the United States
74th	May 22, 1935	Joint session	Veto message	Franklin D. Roosevelt, President of the United States
74th	January 3, 1936	Joint session	State of the Union address	Franklin D. Roosevelt, President of the United States
75th	January 6, 1937	Joint session	Counting electoral votes for the 1936 presidential election	None
75th	January 6, 1937	Joint session	State of the Union address	Franklin D. Roosevelt, President of the United States
75th	January 20, 1937	Inauguration	Inauguration of Franklin D. Roosevelt	Franklin D. Roosevelt, President of the United States; John Nance Garner, Vice President of the United States
75th	January 3, 1938	Joint session	State of the Union address	Franklin D. Roosevelt, President of the United States
76th	January 4, 1939	Joint session	State of the Union address	Franklin D. Roosevelt, President of the United States
76th	March 4, 1939	Joint session	Sesquicentennial of the 1st Congress	Franklin D. Roosevelt, President of the United States
76th	June 9, 1939	Joint meeting	Reception	George VI, King of Canada; Queen Elizabeth
76th	September 21, 1939	Joint session	American neutrality in World War II	Franklin D. Roosevelt, President of the United States

== 1940s ==
Congress	Date	Type	Occasion	Dignitary speaking
76th	January 3, 1940	Joint session	State of the Union address	Franklin D. Roosevelt, President of the United States
76th	May 16, 1940	Joint session	Discussing national defense	Franklin D. Roosevelt, President of the United States
77th	January 6, 1941	Joint session	Counting electoral votes for the 1940 presidential election	None
77th	January 6, 1941	Joint session	State of the Union address	Franklin D. Roosevelt, President of the United States
77th	January 20, 1941	Joint session	Inauguration of Franklin D. Roosevelt	Franklin D. Roosevelt, President of the United States; Henry A. Wallace, Vice President of the United States
77th	December 8, 1941	Joint session	Day of Infamy speech	Franklin D. Roosevelt, President of the United States
77th	December 26, 1941	Joint meeting	First address (Transcript)	Winston Churchill, Prime Minister of the United Kingdom
77th	January 6, 1942	Joint session	State of the Union address	Franklin D. Roosevelt, President of the United States
78th	January 7, 1943	Joint session	State of the Union address	Franklin D. Roosevelt, President of the United States
78th	February 18, 1943	Joint session	Address	Soong Mei-ling, First Lady of the Republic of China
78th	May 19, 1943	Joint meeting	Second address	Winston Churchill, Prime Minister of the United Kingdom
78th	November 18, 1943	Joint meeting	Moscow Conference	Cordell Hull, Secretary of State
79th	January 6, 1945	Joint session	Counting electoral votes for the 1944 presidential election	None
79th	January 6, 1945	Joint session	State of the Union address	Roosevelt was not present, so his address was read before Congress
79th	January 20, 1945	Inauguration	Inauguration of Franklin D. Roosevelt	Franklin D. Roosevelt, President of the United States; Harry S. Truman, Vice President of the United States
79th	March 1, 1945	Joint session	Yalta Conference	Franklin D. Roosevelt, President of the United States
79th	April 16, 1945	Joint session	Prosecution of the War	Harry S. Truman, President of the United States
79th	May 21, 1945	Joint session	Bestowal of the Medal of Honor on Jake W. Lindsey	George Marshall, Chief of Staff of the Army; Harry S. Truman, President of the United States
79th	June 18, 1945	Joint meeting	Address	Dwight D. Eisenhower, Supreme Commander of the Allied Expeditionary Force
79th	October 5, 1945	Joint meeting	Address	Chester W. Nimitz, Commander-in-Chief, Pacific Fleet
79th	October 23, 1945	Joint session	Universal military training message	Harry S. Truman, President of the United States
79th	November 13, 1945	Joint meeting	Address	Clement Attlee, Prime Minister of the United Kingdom
79th	May 25, 1946	Joint session	Railroad strike message	Harry S. Truman, President of the United States
79th	July 1, 1946	Joint session	Memorial to Franklin D. Roosevelt	John Winant, U.S. representative to UNESCO; Also attended by Harry S. Truman, President of the United States and Eleanor Roosevelt, Former First Lady of the United States
80th	January 6, 1947	Joint session	State of the Union address	Harry S. Truman, President of the United States
80th	March 12, 1947	Joint session	Aid to Greece and Turkey (Truman Doctrine)	Harry S. Truman, President of the United States
80th	May 1, 1947	Joint meeting	Address	Miguel Alemán Valdés, President of Mexico
80th	November 17, 1947	Joint session	Aid to Europe (Marshall Plan)	Harry S. Truman, President of the United States
80th	January 7, 1948	Joint session	State of the Union address	Harry S. Truman, President of the United States
80th	March 17, 1948	Joint session	National security and conditions in Europe	Harry S. Truman, President of the United States
80th	April 19, 1948	Joint session	50th anniversary of the liberation of Cuba	Harry S. Truman, President of the United States; Guillermo Belt, Cuban ambassador to the United States
80th	July 27, 1948	Joint session	Inflation, housing, and civil rights	Harry S. Truman, President of the United States
81st	January 5, 1949	Joint session	State of the Union address	Harry S. Truman, President of the United States
81st	January 6, 1949	Joint session	Counting electoral votes for the 1948 presidential election	None
81st	January 20, 1949	Joint session	Inauguration of Harry S. Truman	Harry S. Truman, President of the United States; Alben W. Barkley, Vice President of the United States
81st	May 19, 1949	Joint meeting	Address	Eurico Gaspar Dutra, President of Brazil

== 1950s ==
Congress	Date	Type	Occasion	Dignitary speaking
81st	January 4, 1950	Joint session	State of the Union address	Harry S. Truman, President of the United States
81st	May 31, 1950	Joint meeting	Address	Dean Acheson, Secretary of State
81st	August 1, 1950	Joint meeting	Address	Robert Menzies, Prime Minister of Australia
82nd	January 8, 1951	Joint session	State of the Union address	Harry S. Truman, President of the United States
82nd	February 1, 1951	Joint meeting	NATO	Dwight D. Eisenhower, General of the Army
82nd	April 2, 1951	Joint meeting	Address	Vincent Auriol, President of France
82nd	April 19, 1951	Joint meeting	Address	Douglas MacArthur, General of the Army
82nd	June 21, 1951	Joint meeting	Address	Galo Plaza, President of Ecuador
82nd	September 24, 1951	Joint meeting	Address	Alcide de Gasperi, Prime Minister of Italy
82nd	January 9, 1952	Joint session	State of the Union address	Harry S. Truman, President of the United States
82nd	January 17, 1952	Joint meeting	Third address	Winston Churchill, Prime Minister of the United Kingdom
82nd	April 3, 1952	Joint meeting	Address	Juliana, Queen of the Netherlands
82nd	May 22, 1952	Joint meeting	Korean War	Matthew Ridgway, General
82nd	June 10, 1952	Joint session	Steel industry dispute	Harry S. Truman, President of the United States
83rd	January 6, 1953	Joint session	Counting electoral votes for the 1952 presidential election	None
83rd	January 20, 1953	Joint session	Inauguration of Dwight D. Eisenhower	Dwight D. Eisenhower, President of the United States; Richard Nixon, Vice President of the United States
83rd	February 2, 1953	Joint session	State of the Union address	Dwight D. Eisenhower, President of the United States
83rd	January 7, 1954	Joint session	State of the Union address	Dwight D. Eisenhower, President of the United States
83rd	January 29, 1954	Joint meeting	Address	Celal Bayar, President of Turkey
83rd	May 4, 1954	Joint meeting	Address	Vincent Massey, Governor General of Canada
83rd	May 28, 1954	Joint meeting	Address	Haile Selassie I, Emperor of Ethiopia
83rd	July 28, 1954	Joint meeting	Address	Syngman Rhee, President of South Korea
84th	January 6, 1955	Joint session	State of the Union address	Dwight D. Eisenhower, President of the United States
84th	January 27, 1955	Joint meeting	Address	Paul Magloire, President of Haiti
84th	February 29, 1956	Joint meeting	Address	Giovanni Gronchi, President of the Italian Republic
84th	May 17, 1956	Joint meeting	Address	Sukarno, President of Indonesia
85th	January 5, 1957	Joint session	Middle East message	Dwight D. Eisenhower, President of the United States
85th	January 7, 1957	Joint session	Counting electoral votes for the 1956 presidential election	None
85th	January 10, 1957	Joint session	State of the Union address	Dwight D. Eisenhower, President of the United States
85th	January 21, 1957	Joint session	Inauguration of Dwight D. Eisenhower	Dwight D. Eisenhower, President of the United States; Richard Nixon, Vice President of the United States
85th	May 9, 1957	Joint meeting	Address	Ngo Dinh Diem, President of South Vietnam
85th	January 9, 1958	Joint session	State of the Union address	Dwight D. Eisenhower, President of the United States
85th	June 5, 1958	Joint meeting	Address	Theodor Heuss, President of West Germany
85th	June 18, 1958	Joint meeting	Address	Carlos P. Garcia, President of the Philippines
86th	January 9, 1959	Joint session	State of the Union address	Dwight D. Eisenhower, President of the United States
86th	January 21, 1959	Joint meeting	Address	Arturo Frondizi, President of Argentina
86th	February 12, 1959	Joint session	Sesquicentennial of Abraham Lincoln's birthday	Fredric March, Actor; Carl Sandburg, Poet
86th	March 11, 1959	Joint meeting	Address	José María Lemus, President of El Salvador
86th	March 18, 1959	Joint meeting	Address	Seán T. O'Kelly, President of Ireland
86th	May 12, 1959	Joint meeting	Address	Baudouin, King of the Belgians

== 1960s ==
Congress	Date	Type	Occasion	Dignitary speaking
86th	January 7, 1960	Joint session	State of the Union address	Dwight D. Eisenhower, President of the United States
86th	April 6, 1960	Joint meeting	Address	Alberto Lleras Camargo, President of Colombia
86th	April 25, 1960	Joint meeting	Address	Charles de Gaulle, President of France
86th	April 28, 1960	Joint meeting	Address	Mahendra, King of Nepal
86th	June 29, 1960	Joint meeting	Address	Bhumibol Adulyadej, King of Thailand
87th	January 6, 1961	Joint session	Counting electoral votes for the 1960 presidential election	None
87th	January 20, 1961	Joint session	Inauguration of John F. Kennedy	John F. Kennedy, President of the United States; Lyndon B. Johnson, Vice President of the United States
87th	January 30, 1961	Joint session	State of the Union address	John F. Kennedy, President of the United States
87th	May 4, 1961	Joint meeting	Address	Habib Bourguiba, President of Tunisia
87th	May 25, 1961	Joint session	Lunar exploration: "Special Message to the Congress on Urgent National Needs"	John F. Kennedy, President of the United States
87th	July 12, 1961	Joint meeting	Address	Ayub Khan, President of Pakistan
87th	September 21, 1961	Joint meeting	Address	Manuel Prado Ugarteche, President of Peru
87th	January 11, 1962	Joint session	State of the Union address	John F. Kennedy, President of the United States
87th	February 26, 1962	Joint meeting	Flight of Mercury-Atlas 6	John Glenn, Astronaut
87th	April 4, 1962	Joint meeting	Address	João Goulart, President of Brazil
87th	April 12, 1962	Joint meeting	Address	Mohammad Reza Pahlavi, Shahanshah and Aryamehr of Iran
88th	January 14, 1963	Joint session	State of the Union address	John F. Kennedy, President of the United States
88th	May 21, 1963	Joint meeting	Flight of Mercury-Atlas 9	Gordon Cooper, Astronaut
88th	November 27, 1963	Joint session	Assumption of the Presidency: "Let Us Continue"	Lyndon B. Johnson, President of the United States
88th	January 8, 1964	Joint session	State of the Union address	Lyndon B. Johnson, President of the United States
88th	January 15, 1964	Joint meeting	Address	Antonio Segni, President of the Italian Republic
88th	May 28, 1964	Joint meeting	Address	Éamon de Valera, President of Ireland
89th	January 4, 1965	Joint session	State of the Union address	Lyndon B. Johnson, President of the United States
89th	January 6, 1965	Joint session	Counting electoral votes for the 1964 presidential election	None
89th	January 20, 1965	Joint session	Inauguration of Lyndon B. Johnson	Lyndon B. Johnson, President of the United States; Hubert Humphrey, Vice President of the United States
89th	March 15, 1965	Joint session	Voting rights: "We Shall Overcome"	Lyndon B. Johnson, President of the United States
89th	September 14, 1965	Joint meeting	Flight of Gemini 5	Gordon Cooper, Astronaut; Pete Conrad, Astronaut
89th	January 12, 1966	Joint session	State of the Union address	Lyndon B. Johnson, President of the United States
89th	September 15, 1966	Joint meeting	Address	Ferdinand Marcos, President of the Philippines
90th	January 10, 1967	Joint session	State of the Union address	Lyndon B. Johnson, President of the United States
90th	April 28, 1967	Joint meeting	Vietnam War	William Westmoreland, General
90th	October 27, 1967	Joint meeting	Address	Gustavo Díaz Ordaz, President of Mexico
90th	January 17, 1968	Joint session	State of the Union address	Lyndon B. Johnson, President of the United States
91st	January 6, 1969	Joint session	Counting electoral votes for the 1968 presidential election	None
91st	January 9, 1969	Joint meeting	Flight of Apollo 8	Frank Borman, Astronaut; Jim Lovell, Astronaut; William Anders, Astronaut
91st	January 14, 1969	Joint session	State of the Union address	Lyndon B. Johnson, President of the United States
91st	January 20, 1969	Joint session	Inauguration of Richard Nixon	Richard Nixon, President of the United States; Spiro Agnew, Vice President of the United States
91st	September 16, 1969	Joint meeting	Flight of Apollo 11	Neil Armstrong, Astronaut; Edwin Aldrin, Astronaut; Michael Collins, Astronaut

== 1970s ==
Congress	Date	Type	Occasion	Dignitary speaking
91st	January 22, 1970	Joint session	State of the Union address	Richard Nixon, President of the United States
91st	February 25, 1970	Joint meeting	Address	Georges Pompidou, President of France
91st	June 3, 1970	Joint meeting	Address	Rafael Caldera, President of Venezuela
91st	September 22, 1970	Joint meeting	Report on prisoners of war	Frank Borman, Representative to the President on Prisoners of War
92nd	January 22, 1971	Joint session	State of the Union address	Richard Nixon, President of the United States
92nd	September 9, 1971	Joint session	Economic policy	Richard Nixon, President of the United States
92nd	September 9, 1971	Joint meeting	Flight of Apollo 15	David Scott, Astronaut; James Irwin, Astronaut; Alfred Worden, Astronaut
92nd	January 20, 1972	Joint session	State of the Union address	Richard Nixon, President of the United States
92nd	June 1, 1972	Joint session	European trip report	Richard Nixon, President of the United States
92nd	June 15, 1972	Joint meeting	Address	Luis Echeverría, President of Mexico
93rd	January 6, 1973	Joint session	Counting electoral votes for the 1972 presidential election	None
93rd	January 20, 1973	Inauguration	Inauguration of Richard Nixon	Richard Nixon, President of the United States; Spiro Agnew, Vice President of the United States
93rd	December 6, 1973	Joint meeting	Swearing in of Gerald Ford as Vice President	Gerald Ford, Vice President of the United States; Also attended by Richard Nixon, President of the United States
93rd	January 30, 1974	Joint session	State of the Union address	Richard Nixon, President of the United States
93rd	August 12, 1974	Joint session	Assumption of the Presidency	Gerald Ford, President of the United States
93rd	October 8, 1974	Joint session	Discussing the economy	Gerald Ford, President of the United States
94th	January 15, 1975	Joint session	State of the Union address	Gerald Ford, President of the United States
94th	April 10, 1975	Joint session	State of the World message	Gerald Ford, President of the United States
94th	June 17, 1975	Joint meeting	Address	Walter Scheel, President of West Germany
94th	November 5, 1975	Joint meeting	Address	Anwar Sadat, President of Egypt
94th	January 19, 1976	Joint session	State of the Union address	Gerald Ford, President of the United States
94th	January 28, 1976	Joint meeting	First address	Yitzhak Rabin, Prime Minister of Israel
94th	March 17, 1976	Joint meeting	Address	Liam Cosgrave, Taoiseach of Ireland
94th	May 18, 1976	Joint meeting	Address	Valéry Giscard d'Estaing, President of France
94th	June 2, 1976	Joint meeting	Address	Juan Carlos I, King of Spain
94th	September 23, 1976	Joint meeting	Address	William R. Tolbert, Jr., President of Liberia
95th	January 6, 1977	Joint session	Counting electoral votes for the 1976 presidential election	None
95th	January 12, 1977	Joint session	State of the Union address	Gerald Ford, President of the United States
95th	January 20, 1977	Inauguration	Inauguration of Jimmy Carter	Jimmy Carter, President of the United States; Walter Mondale, Vice President of the United States
95th	February 22, 1977	Joint meeting	Address	Pierre Trudeau, Prime Minister of Canada
95th	April 20, 1977	Joint session	Discussing energy	Jimmy Carter, President of the United States
95th	January 19, 1978	Joint session	State of the Union address	Jimmy Carter, President of the United States
95th	September 18, 1978	Joint session	Middle East peace agreements	Attended by Anwar Sadat, President of Egypt; And Menachem Begin, Prime Minister of Israel
96th	January 23, 1979	Joint session	State of the Union address	Jimmy Carter, President of the United States
96th	June 18, 1979	Joint session	SALT II	Jimmy Carter, President of the United States

== 1980s ==
Congress	Date	Type	Occasion	Dignitary speaking
96th	January 23, 1980	Joint session	State of the Union address	Jimmy Carter, President of the United States
97th	January 6, 1981	Joint session	Counting electoral votes for the 1980 presidential election	None
97th	January 20, 1981	Joint session	Inauguration of Ronald Reagan	Ronald Reagan, President of the United States; George H. W. Bush, Vice President of the United States
97th	February 18, 1981	Joint session	Economic recovery	Ronald Reagan, President of the United States
97th	April 28, 1981	Joint session	Economic recovery and inflation	Ronald Reagan, President of the United States
97th	January 26, 1982	Joint session	State of the Union address	Ronald Reagan, President of the United States
97th	January 28, 1982	Joint meeting	Centennial of Franklin D. Roosevelt's birthday	Arthur M. Schlesinger, Jr., Historian; Jennings Randolph, U.S. Senator; Claude Pepper, U.S. Representative; W. Averell Harriman, Former Governor of New York; James Roosevelt, Former U.S. Representative and son of Franklin D. Roosevelt
97th	April 21, 1982	Joint meeting	Address	Beatrix, Queen of the Netherlands
98th	January 25, 1983	Joint session	State of the Union address	Ronald Reagan, President of the United States
98th	April 27, 1983	Joint session	Central America	Ronald Reagan, President of the United States
98th	October 5, 1983	Joint meeting	Address	Karl Carstens, President of West Germany
98th	January 25, 1984	Joint session	State of the Union address	Ronald Reagan, President of the United States
98th	March 15, 1984	Joint meeting	Address	Garret FitzGerald, Taoiseach of Ireland
98th	March 22, 1984	Joint meeting	Address	François Mitterrand, President of France
98th	May 8, 1984	Joint meeting	Centennial of Harry S. Truman's birthday	Ike Skelton, U.S. Representative; Alan Wheat, U.S. Representative; Stuart Symington, Former U.S. Senator; Margaret Truman, Daughter of Harry S. Truman; Mark Hatfield, U.S. Senator
98th	May 16, 1984	Joint meeting	Address	Miguel de la Madrid, President of Mexico
99th	January 7, 1985	Joint session	Counting electoral votes for the 1984 presidential election	None
99th	January 21, 1985	Inauguration	Inauguration of Ronald Reagan	Ronald Reagan, President of the United States; George H. W. Bush, Vice President of the United States
99th	February 6, 1985	Joint session	State of the Union address	Ronald Reagan, President of the United States
99th	February 20, 1985	Joint meeting	Address	Margaret Thatcher, Prime Minister of the United Kingdom
99th	March 6, 1985	Joint meeting	Address	Bettino Craxi, Prime Minister of Italy
99th	March 20, 1985	Joint meeting	Address	Raúl Alfonsín, President of Argentina
99th	June 13, 1985	Joint meeting	Address	Rajiv Gandhi, Prime Minister of India
99th	October 9, 1985	Joint meeting	Address	Lee Kuan Yew, Prime Minister of Singapore
99th	November 21, 1985	Joint session	Geneva Summit	Ronald Reagan, President of the United States
99th	February 4, 1986	Joint session	State of the Union address	Ronald Reagan, President of the United States
99th	September 11, 1986	Joint meeting	Address	José Sarney, President of Brazil
99th	September 18, 1986	Joint meeting	Address	Corazon Aquino, President of the Philippines
100th	January 27, 1987	Joint session	State of the Union address	Ronald Reagan, President of the United States
100th	November 10, 1987	Joint meeting	Address	Chaim Herzog, President of Israel
100th	January 25, 1988	Joint session	State of the Union address	Ronald Reagan, President of the United States
100th	April 27, 1988	Joint meeting	Address	Brian Mulroney, Prime Minister of Canada
100th	June 23, 1988	Joint meeting	Address	Bob Hawke, Prime Minister of Australia
101st	January 4, 1989	Joint session	Counting electoral votes for the 1988 presidential election	None
101st	January 20, 1989	Inauguration	Inauguration of George H. W. Bush	George H. W. Bush, President of the United States; Dan Quayle, Vice President of the United States
101st	February 9, 1989	Joint session	Building a Better America	George H. W. Bush, President of the United States
101st	March 2, 1989	Joint meeting	Bicentennial of the 1st Congress	Robert Byrd, President pro tempore of the Senate; Howard Nemerov, Poet Laureate; David McCullough, Historian; Anthony M. Frank, Postmaster General; Nicholas F. Brady, Secretary of the Treasury
101st	June 7, 1989	Joint meeting	Address	Benazir Bhutto, Prime Minister of Pakistan
101st	October 4, 1989	Joint meeting	Address	Carlos Salinas de Gortari, President of Mexico
101st	October 18, 1989	Joint meeting	Address	Roh Tae-woo, President of South Korea
101st	November 15, 1989	Joint meeting	Address	Lech Wałęsa, Chairman of Solidarity

== 1990s ==
Congress	Date	Type	Occasion	Dignitary speaking
101st	January 31, 1990	Joint session	State of the Union address	George H. W. Bush, President of the United States
101st	February 21, 1990	Joint meeting	Address	Václav Havel, President of Czechoslovakia
101st	March 7, 1990	Joint meeting	Address	Giulio Andreotti, Prime Minister of Italy
101st	March 27, 1990	Joint meeting	Centennial of Dwight D. Eisenhower's birthday	Bob Dole, U.S. Senator; Walter Cronkite, Broadcast journalist Winston Churchill, Member of British Parliament and grandson of Winston Churchill; Clark Clifford, Former Secretary of Defense; James D. Robinson III, Chairman of Eisenhower Centennial Foundation; Arnold Palmer, Professional golfer John Eisenhower, Former Ambassador to Belgium and son of Dwight D. Eisenhower; Beverly Byron, U.S. Representative; William F. Goodling, U.S. Representative; Pat Roberts, U.S. Representative
101st	June 26, 1990	Joint meeting	First address	Nelson Mandela, Deputy President of the African National Congress
101st	September 11, 1990	Joint session	Invasion of Kuwait	George H. W. Bush, President of the United States
102nd	January 29, 1991	Joint session	State of the Union address	George H. W. Bush, President of the United States
102nd	March 6, 1991	Joint session	End of the Gulf War	George H. W. Bush, President of the United States
102nd	April 16, 1991	Joint meeting	Address	Violeta Chamorro, President of Nicaragua
102nd	May 16, 1991	Joint meeting	Address	Elizabeth II, Queen of the United Kingdom of Great Britain and Northern Ireland; Also attended by Prince Philip, Duke of Edinburgh
102nd	November 14, 1991	Joint meeting	Address	Carlos Menem, President of Argentina
102nd	January 28, 1992	Joint session	State of the Union address	George H. W. Bush, President of the United States
102nd	April 30, 1992	Joint meeting	Address	Richard von Weizsäcker, President of Germany
102nd	June 17, 1992	Joint meeting	Address	Boris Yeltsin, President of Russia
103rd	January 6, 1993	Joint session	Counting electoral votes for the 1992 presidential election	None
103rd	January 20, 1993	Inauguration	Inauguration of Bill Clinton	Bill Clinton, President of the United States; Al Gore, Vice President of the United States
103rd	February 17, 1993	Joint session	Economic address	Bill Clinton, President of the United States
103rd	September 22, 1993	Joint session	Health care reform	Bill Clinton, President of the United States
103rd	January 25, 1994	Joint session	State of the Union address	Bill Clinton, President of the United States
103rd	May 18, 1994	Joint meeting	Address	P. V. Narasimha Rao, Prime Minister of India
103rd	July 26, 1994	Joint meeting	Address (Hussein); Second address (Rabin)	Hussein, King of Jordan; Yitzhak Rabin, Prime Minister of Israel
103rd	October 6, 1994	Joint meeting	Second address	Nelson Mandela, President of South Africa
104th	January 24, 1995	Joint session	State of the Union address	Bill Clinton, President of the United States
104th	July 26, 1995	Joint meeting	Address	Kim Young-sam, President of South Korea
104th	October 11, 1995	Joint meeting	Close of the Commemoration of the 50th Anniversary of World War II	Newt Gingrich, Speaker of the House; Al Gore, Vice President of the United States; Strom Thurmond, President pro tempore of the Senate; Henry Hyde, U.S. Representative; Gillespie V. Montgomery, U.S. Representative; Daniel Inouye, U.S. Senator; Bob Dole, U.S. Senator; Robert H. Michel, Former U.S. Representative; Louis H. Wilson, Jr., Former Commandant of the Marine Corps
104th	December 12, 1995	Joint meeting	Address	Shimon Peres, Prime Minister of Israel
104th	January 23, 1996	Joint session	State of the Union address	Bill Clinton, President of the United States
104th	February 1, 1996	Joint meeting	Address	Jacques Chirac, President of France
104th	July 10, 1996	Joint meeting	First address	Benjamin Netanyahu, Prime Minister of Israel
104th	September 11, 1996	Joint meeting	Address	John Bruton, Taoiseach of Ireland
105th	January 9, 1997	Joint session	Counting electoral votes for the 1996 presidential election	None
105th	January 20, 1997	Inauguration	Inauguration of Bill Clinton	Bill Clinton, President of the United States; Al Gore, Vice President of the United States
105th	February 4, 1997	Joint session	State of the Union address	Bill Clinton, President of the United States
105th	February 27, 1997	Joint meeting	Address	Eduardo Frei Ruiz-Tagle, President of Chile
105th	January 27, 1998	Joint session	State of the Union address	Bill Clinton, President of the United States
105th	June 10, 1998	Joint meeting	Address	Kim Dae-jung, President of South Korea
105th	July 15, 1998	Joint meeting	Address	Emil Constantinescu, President of Romania
106th	January 19, 1999	Joint session	State of the Union address	Bill Clinton, President of the United States

== 2000s ==
Congress	Date	Type	Occasion	Dignitary speaking
106th	January 27, 2000	Joint session	State of the Union address	Bill Clinton, President of the United States
106th	September 14, 2000	Joint meeting	Address	Atal Bihari Vajpayee, Prime Minister of India
107th	January 6, 2001	Joint session	Counting electoral votes for the 2000 presidential election	None
107th	January 20, 2001	Inauguration	Inauguration of George W. Bush	George W. Bush, President of the United States; Dick Cheney, Vice President of the United States
107th	February 27, 2001	Joint session	Budget message	George W. Bush, President of the United States
107th	September 6, 2001	Joint meeting	Address	Vicente Fox, President of Mexico
107th	September 20, 2001	Joint session	Address in response to the September 11 attacks	George W. Bush, President of the United States
107th	January 29, 2002	Joint session	State of the Union address	George W. Bush, President of the United States
107th	June 12, 2002†	Joint meeting	Address	John Howard, Prime Minister of Australia
108th	January 28, 2003	Joint session	State of the Union address	George W. Bush, President of the United States
108th	July 17, 2003	Joint meeting	Address	Tony Blair, Prime Minister of the United Kingdom
108th	January 20, 2004	Joint session	State of the Union address	George W. Bush, President of the United States
108th	February 4, 2004	Joint meeting	Address	José María Aznar, Prime Minister of Spain
108th	June 15, 2004	Joint meeting	Address	Hamid Karzai, President of the Afghan Transitional Administration
108th	September 23, 2004	Joint meeting	Address	Ayad Allawi, Interim Prime Minister of Iraq
109th	January 6, 2005	Joint session	Counting electoral votes for the 2004 presidential election	None
109th	January 20, 2005	Inauguration	Inauguration of George W. Bush	George W. Bush, President of the United States; Dick Cheney, Vice President of the United States
109th	February 2, 2005	Joint session	State of the Union address	George W. Bush, President of the United States
109th	April 6, 2005	Joint meeting	Address	Viktor Yushchenko, President of Ukraine
109th	July 19, 2005	Joint meeting	Address	Manmohan Singh, Prime Minister of India
109th	January 31, 2006	Joint session	State of the Union address	George W. Bush, President of the United States
109th	March 1, 2006	Joint meeting	Address	Silvio Berlusconi, Prime Minister of Italy
109th	March 15, 2006	Joint meeting	Address	Ellen Johnson Sirleaf, President of Liberia
109th	May 24, 2006	Joint meeting	Address	Ehud Olmert, Prime Minister of Israel
109th	June 7, 2006	Joint meeting	Address	Vaira Vīķe-Freiberga, President of Latvia
109th	July 26, 2006	Joint meeting	Address	Nouri al-Maliki, Prime Minister of Iraq
110th	January 23, 2007	Joint session	State of the Union address	George W. Bush, President of the United States
110th	March 7, 2007	Joint meeting	Address	Abdullah II, King of Jordan
110th	November 7, 2007	Joint meeting	Address	Nicolas Sarkozy, President of France
110th	January 28, 2008	Joint session	State of the Union address	George W. Bush, President of the United States
110th	April 30, 2008	Joint meeting	Address	Bertie Ahern, Taoiseach of Ireland
111th	January 8, 2009	Joint session	Counting electoral votes for the 2008 presidential election	None
111th	January 20, 2009	Inauguration	Inauguration of Barack Obama	Barack Obama, President of the United States; Joe Biden, Vice President of the United States
111th	February 24, 2009	Joint session	Economic address	Barack Obama, President of the United States
111th	March 4, 2009	Joint meeting	Address	Gordon Brown, Prime Minister of the United Kingdom
111th	September 9, 2009	Joint session	Health care reform	Barack Obama, President of the United States
111th	November 3, 2009	Joint meeting	Address	Angela Merkel, Chancellor of Germany

†John Howard's address before the Joint Meeting of Congress in 2002 was originally scheduled for September 12, 2001, but was interrupted by the September 11 attacks. He was already in Washington when the attacks occurred, and sat in on the September 12 session of the House of Representatives.

== 2010s ==
Congress	Date	Type	Occasion	Dignitary speaking
111th	January 27, 2010	Joint session	State of the Union address	Barack Obama, President of the United States
111th	May 20, 2010	Joint meeting	Address	Felipe Calderón, President of Mexico
112th	January 25, 2011	Joint session	State of the Union address	Barack Obama, President of the United States
112th	March 9, 2011	Joint meeting	Address	Julia Gillard, Prime Minister of Australia
112th	May 24, 2011	Joint meeting	Second address	Benjamin Netanyahu, Prime Minister of Israel
112th	September 8, 2011	Joint session	American Labor	Barack Obama, President of the United States
112th	October 13, 2011	Joint meeting	Address	Lee Myung-bak, President of South Korea
112th	January 24, 2012	Joint session	State of the Union address	Barack Obama, President of the United States
113th	January 4, 2013	Joint session	Counting electoral votes for the 2012 presidential election	None
113th	January 21, 2013	Inauguration	Inauguration of Barack Obama	Barack Obama, President of the United States; Joe Biden, Vice President of the United States
113th	February 12, 2013	Joint session	State of the Union address	Barack Obama, President of the United States
113th	May 8, 2013	Joint meeting	Address	Park Geun-hye, President of South Korea
113th	January 28, 2014	Joint session	State of the Union address	Barack Obama, President of the United States
113th	September 18, 2014	Joint meeting	Address	Petro Poroshenko, President of Ukraine
114th	January 20, 2015	Joint session	State of the Union address	Barack Obama, President of the United States
114th	March 3, 2015	Joint meeting	Third address	Benjamin Netanyahu, Prime Minister of Israel
114th	March 25, 2015	Joint meeting	Address	Ashraf Ghani, President of Afghanistan
114th	April 29, 2015	Joint meeting	Address	Shinzo Abe, Prime Minister of Japan
114th	September 24, 2015	Joint meeting	Address	Pope Francis, Bishop of Rome and Sovereign of the Vatican City
114th	January 12, 2016	Joint session	State of the Union address	Barack Obama, President of the United States
114th	June 8, 2016	Joint meeting	First address	Narendra Modi, Prime Minister of India
115th	January 6, 2017	Joint session	Counting electoral votes for the 2016 presidential election	None
115th	January 20, 2017	Inauguration	Inauguration of Donald Trump	Donald Trump, President of the United States; Mike Pence, Vice President of the United States
115th	February 28, 2017	Joint session	Address	Donald Trump, President of the United States
115th	January 30, 2018	Joint session	State of the Union address	Donald Trump, President of the United States
115th	April 25, 2018	Joint meeting	Address	Emmanuel Macron, President of France
116th	February 5, 2019	Joint session	State of the Union address	Donald Trump, President of the United States
116th	April 3, 2019	Joint meeting	Address	Jens Stoltenberg, Secretary General of NATO

== 2020s ==
Congress	Date	Type	Occasion	Dignitary speaking
116th	February 4, 2020	Joint session	State of the Union address	Donald Trump, President of the United States
117th	January 6–7, 2021	Joint session	Counting electoral votes for the 2020 presidential election (Interrupted by the U.S. Capitol attack)	None
117th	January 20, 2021	Inauguration	Inauguration of Joe Biden	Joe Biden, President of the United States; Kamala Harris, Vice President of the United States
117th	April 28, 2021	Joint session	Address	Joe Biden, President of the United States
117th	March 1, 2022	Joint session	State of the Union address	Joe Biden, President of the United States
117th	March 16, 2022	Informal meeting	Virtual address	Volodymyr Zelenskyy, President of Ukraine
117th	May 17, 2022	Joint meeting	Address	Kyriakos Mitsotakis, Prime Minister of Greece
117th	July 20, 2022	Informal meeting	Address	Olena Zelenska, First Lady of Ukraine
117th	December 21, 2022	Joint meeting	Address	Volodymyr Zelenskyy, President of Ukraine
118th	February 7, 2023	Joint session	State of the Union address	Joe Biden, President of the United States
118th	April 27, 2023	Joint meeting	Address	Yoon Suk Yeol, President of South Korea
118th	June 22, 2023	Joint meeting	Second address	Narendra Modi, Prime Minister of India
118th	July 19, 2023	Joint meeting	Address	Isaac Herzog, President of Israel
118th	March 7, 2024	Joint session	State of the Union address	Joe Biden, President of the United States
118th	April 11, 2024	Joint meeting	Address	Fumio Kishida, Prime Minister of Japan
118th	July 24, 2024	Joint meeting	Fourth address	Benjamin Netanyahu, Prime Minister of Israel
119th	January 6, 2025	Joint session	Counting electoral votes for the 2024 presidential election	None
119th	January 20, 2025	Inauguration	Inauguration of Donald Trump	Donald Trump, President of the United States; JD Vance, Vice President of the United States
119th	March 4, 2025	Joint session	Address	Donald Trump, President of the United States
119th	February 24, 2026	Joint session	State of the Union address	Donald Trump, President of the United States
119th	April 28, 2026	Joint meeting	Address	Charles III, King of the United Kingdom of Great Britain and Northern Ireland; Also attended by Queen Camilla

== See also ==
- List of people who have addressed both houses of the Parliament of the United Kingdom
- List of addresses to the Oireachtas
- List of United States Congresses
