= Response to the State of the Union address =

Annual American political speech

In American politics, the response to the State of the Union address is a rebuttal speech, often brief, delivered by a representative (or representatives) of an opposition party following a presidential State of the Union address. When the president is a Democrat, the rebuttal is typically given by a Republican, and vice versa.

The practice began in 1966 when Republican Sen. Everett Dirksen (Illinois) and Rep. Gerald Ford (Michigan) appeared on TV to offer a response to the address by Democratic President Lyndon Johnson. The opposition party's response has varied in format, ranging from a prerecorded 45-minute TV program in 1970 to a call-in show in 1972 where a panel of congressmen answered unrehearsed questions from callers. Since the late 1980s, it usually has been a televised speech given soon after the State of the Union address.

Four presidents have given both a State of the Union address and an opposition response: Gerald Ford, George H. W. Bush, Bill Clinton, and Joe Biden.

== List of responses ==
Unless otherwise noted, the response was broadcast live the same night as the State of the Union address and given in English.

Year	Responding Party/Group	Response given by	Notes
President Lyndon Johnson (D)
1966	Republican	Senate Minority Leader Everett Dirksen (IL) and House Minority Leader Gerald Ford (MI)	Response given five days later and recorded live and broadcast that evening
1967	Republican	Senate Minority Leader Everett Dirksen (IL) and House Minority Leader Gerald Ford (MI)	Formatted as a news conference
1968	Republican	Sens. Howard Baker (TN), Peter Dominick (CO), Robert Griffin (MI), Thomas Kuchel (CA), George Murphy (CA), Chuck Percy (IL), Hugh Scott (PA), and John Tower (TX) and Reps. George Bush (TX), Gerald Ford (MI), Mel Laird (WI), Bob Mathias (CA), Dick Poff (VA), Al Quie (MN), Charlotte Reid (IL), and Bill Steiger (WI)	Response given six days later
1969	Republican	No response given due to the address occurring in the final week of Johnson's term	
President Richard Nixon (R)
1970	Democratic	Sens. Albert Gore (TN), Philip Hart (MI), Scoop Jackson (WA), Mike Mansfield (MT), Ed Muskie (ME), and Bill Proxmire (WI), and Ralph Yardborough (TX), and Reps. Speaker Carl Albert (OK), Donald Fraser (MN), John McCormack (MA), and Patsy Mink (HI)	Prerecorded response given seventeen days later and included discussions with voters
1971	Democratic	Senate Majority Leader Mike Mansfield (MT)	Response given four days later in an interview format with reporters asking questions
1972	Democratic	Sens. Lloyd Bentsen (TX), Frank Church (ID), Tom Eagleton (MO), and Bill Proxmire (WI) and Reps. Carl Albert (OK), Hale Boggs (LA), John Brademas (IN), Martha Griffiths (MI), John Melcher (MT), Ralph Metcalfe (IL), and Leonor Sullivan (MO)	Response given one day later; panelists answered questions submitted live by voters over the phone
1973	Democratic	No response given due to Nixon submitting the State of the Union report in writing	
1974	Democratic	Senate Majority Leader Mike Mansfield (MT)	Response given two days later
President Gerald Ford (R)
1975	Democratic	Rep. Carl Albert (OK) and Sen. Hubert Humphrey (MN)	Response given five to seven days later with Albert's speech airing on the first two nights and Humphrey's speech on the third night
1976	Democratic	Sen. Ed Muskie (ME)	Response given two days later
1977	Democratic	No response given due to the address occurring in the final week of Ford's term	
President Jimmy Carter (D)
1978	Republican	Senate Minority Leader Howard Baker (TN) and House Minority Leader John Rhodes (AZ)	Response given seven days later in a question-and-answer format
1979	Republican	Senate Minority Leader Howard Baker (TN) and House Minority Leader John Rhodes (AZ)	Baker and Rhodes gave official response one day later as a news conference; Sen. Bob Dole (KS) and Rep. Barber Conable (NY) joined Baker and Rhodes for an interview on NBC that evening
1980	Republican	Acting Senate Minority Leader Ted Stevens (AK) and House Minority Leader John Rhodes (AZ)	Prerecorded response given five days later
1981	Republican	No response given due to Carter submitting the State of the Union report in writing	
President Ronald Reagan (R)
1981 (Note: Starting in 1981, first-term Presidents have been invited to address a joint session of Congress shortly after their inauguration. These have reflected the style of a State of the Union address but are not officially titled as a "State of the Union." Since 1989 the opposition party has offered a response.)	Democratic	No response given to Reagan's first address to a joint session of Congress	
1982	Democratic	Gov. Jerry Brown (CA); Sens. Robert Byrd (WV), Alan Cranston (CA), Gary Hart (CO), Bennett Johnston (LA), Ted Kennedy (MA), Don Riegle (MI), Paul Sarbanes (MD), and Jim Sasser (TN); Speaker of the House Tip O'Neill (MA); and Rep. Al Gore (TN)	Prerecorded, documentary-style response including man-on-the-street interviews
1983	Democratic	Sens. Joe Biden (DE), Bill Bradley (NJ), Robert Byrd (WV), and Paul Tsongas (MA); Speaker of the House Tip O'Neill (MA); and Reps. Les AuCoin (OR), Tom Daschle (SD), Bill Hefner (NC), Barbara Kennelly (CT), George Miller (CA), Paul Simon (IL), and Tim Wirth (CO)	Prerecorded
1984	Democratic	Moderated by Gov. Michael Dukakis (MA) and included Sens. Max Baucus (MT), Joe Biden (DE), David Boren (OK), Robert Byrd (WV), Dee Huddleston (KY), Carl Levin (MI), and Claiborne Pell (RI); Speaker of the House Tip O'Neill (MA); and Reps. Barbara Boxer (CA), Dante Fascell (FL), Bill Gray (PA), and Tom Harkin (IA)	Partially prerecorded
1985	Democratic	Hosted by Gov. Bill Clinton (AR) and included remarks from Rep. Dick Gephardt (MO), Speaker of the House Tip O'Neill (MA), and Senate Majority Leader Robert Byrd (WV); focus groups moderated by Sens. Chris Dodd (CT) and Sam Nunn (GA), House Majority Leader Jim Wright (TX), Rep. Bill Richardson (NM), Gov. Chuck Robb (VA), Lt. Gov. Nancy Dick (CO), Attorney General Dave Armstrong (KY), and Mayor Wilson Goode (Philadelphia)	Prerecorded response featuring excerpts from focus groups with Democratic voters moderated by Democratic politicians (Note: NBC and CBS aired the response on the same night as the State of the Union address while ABC aired it two days later)
1986	Democratic	Sen. George Mitchell (ME), Reps. Tom Daschle (SD) and Bill Gray (PA), Lt. Gov. Harriett Woods (MO), and Fmr. Gov. Chuck Robb (VA)	Last response to be given by more than two people
1987	Democratic	Senate Majority Leader Robert Byrd (WV) and Speaker of the House Jim Wright (TX)	
1988	Democratic	Senate Majority Leader Robert Byrd (WV) and Speaker of the House Jim Wright (TX)	
President George H. W. Bush (R)
1989	Democratic	Speaker of the House Jim Wright (TX) and Sen. Lloyd Bentsen (TX)	
1990	Democratic	Speaker of the House Tom Foley (WA)	
1991	Democratic	Senate Majority Leader George Mitchell (ME)	
1992	Democratic	Speaker of the House Tom Foley (WA)	
President Bill Clinton (D)
1993	Republican	House Minority Leader Bob Michel (IL)	
1994	Republican	Senate Minority Leader Bob Dole (KS)	
1995	Republican	Gov. Christine Todd Whitman (NJ)	
1996	Republican	Senate Majority Leader Bob Dole (KS)	
1997	Republican	Rep. J. C. Watts (OK)	
1998	Republican	Senate Majority Leader Trent Lott (MS)	
1999	Republican	Reps. Jennifer Dunn (WA) and Steve Largent (OK)	
2000	Republican	Sens. Susan Collins (ME) and Bill Frist (TN)	
President George W. Bush (R)
2001	Democratic	Senate Minority Leader Tom Daschle (SD) and House Minority Leader Dick Gephardt (MO)	
2002	Democratic	House Minority Leader Dick Gephardt (MO)	
2003	Democratic	Gov. Gary Locke (WA)	
2004	Democratic	Senate Minority Leader Tom Daschle (SD); House Minority Leader Nancy Pelosi (CA)	
2005	Democratic	Senate Minority Leader Harry Reid (NV); House Minority Leader Nancy Pelosi (CA)	
2006	Democratic	Gov. Tim Kaine (VA)	
2007	Democratic	Sen. Jim Webb (VA)	
2008	Democratic	Gov. Kathleen Sebelius (KS)	
President Barack Obama (D)
2009	Republican	Gov. Bobby Jindal (LA)	
2010	Republican	Gov. Bob McDonnell (VA)	
2011	Republican	Rep. Paul Ryan (WI)	
2011	Republican	Rep. Ileana Ros-Lehtinen (FL)	Response given in Spanish
2011	Tea Party	Rep. Michele Bachmann (R-MN)	
2012	Republican	Gov. Mitch Daniels (IN)	
2012	Tea Party	Herman Cain, a businessman from Georgia	
2013	Republican	Sen. Marco Rubio (FL)	Response given in English and Spanish
2013	Tea Party	Sen. Rand Paul (R-KY)	
2014	Republican	Rep. Cathy McMorris Rodgers (WA)	
2014	Republican	Rep. Ileana Ros-Lehtinen (FL)	Response given in Spanish
2014	Tea Party	Sen. Mike Lee (R-UT)	
2015	Republican	Sen. Joni Ernst (IA)	
2015	Republican	Rep. Carlos Curbelo (FL)	Response given in Spanish
2015	Tea Party	Rep. Curt Clawson (R-FL)	
2016	Republican	Gov. Nikki Haley (SC)	
2016	Republican	Rep. Mario Díaz-Balart (FL)	Response given in Spanish
President Donald Trump (R)
2017	Democratic	Fmr. Gov. Steve Beshear (KY)	
2017	Democratic	Astrid Silva, an immigration activist from Nevada	Response given in Spanish
2018	Democratic	Rep. Joe Kennedy III (MA)	
2018	Democratic	State Del. Elizabeth Guzmán (VA)	Response given in Spanish
2019	Democratic	Fmr. State Rep. Stacey Abrams (GA)	
2019	Democratic	Attorney General Xavier Becerra (CA)	Response given in Spanish
2019	Working Families	Lt. Gov. Mandela Barnes (D-WI)	
2020	Democratic	Gov. Gretchen Whitmer (MI)	
2020	Democratic	Rep. Veronica Escobar (TX)	Response given in Spanish
2020	Working Families	Rep. Ayanna Pressley (D-MA)	
President Joe Biden (D)
2021	Republican	Sen. Tim Scott (SC)	
2021	Working Families	Rep. Jamaal Bowman (D-NY)	
2022	Republican	Gov. Kim Reynolds (IA)	
2022	Working Families	Rep. Rashida Tlaib (D-MI)	
2022	Congressional Black Caucus	Rep. Colin Allred (D-TX)	
2022	Problem Solvers Caucus	Reps. Josh Gottheimer (D-NJ) and Brian Fitzpatrick (R-PA)	Organized by No Labels
2023	Republican	Gov. Sarah Huckabee Sanders (AR)	
2023	Republican	Rep. Juan Ciscomani (AZ)	Response given in Spanish
2023	Working Families	Rep. Delia Ramirez (D-IL)	
2024	Republican	Sen. Katie Britt (AL)	
2024	Republican	Rep. Monica De La Cruz (TX)	Response given in Spanish
2024	Working Families	Councilmember Nicolas O'Rourke (Philadelphia At-Large)	
2024	Independent	Presidential Candidate Robert F. Kennedy Jr.	
President Donald Trump (R)
2025	Democratic	Sen. Elissa Slotkin (MI)	
2025	Democratic	Rep. Adriano Espaillat (NY)	Response given in Spanish
2025	Working Families	Rep. Lateefah Simon (CA)	
2025	Independent	Sen. Bernie Sanders (VT)	
2026	Democratic	Gov. Abigail Spanberger (VA)	
2026	Democratic	Sen. Alex Padilla (CA)	Response given in Spanish
2026	Working Families	Rep. Summer Lee (PA)	

== Sources ==
- "Televised Opposition Responses to the President's Annual Message". Office of the Clerk of the U.S. House of Representatives.
