= Designated survivor =

Individual in the presidential line of succession

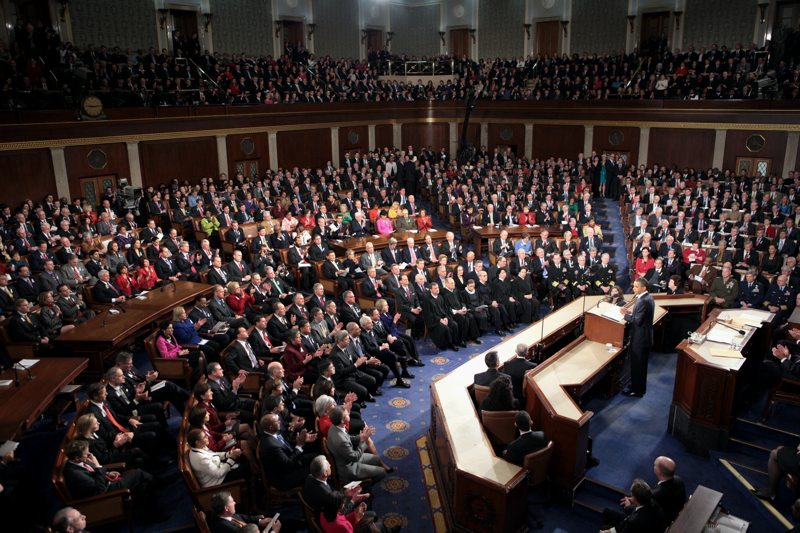
Barack Obama delivers the 2011 State of the Union Address to members of the House and Senate, cabinet members and Supreme Court judges. Secretary of the Interior Ken Salazar was the designated survivor and did not attend. He did not disclose where he spent the evening, except that he was not in Washington, D.C.

In the United States, a designated survivor (or designated successor) is a person in the presidential line of succession who is kept distant from others in the line when they are gathered together, to reduce the chance that everyone in the line will be unable to take over the presidency in a catastrophic or mass-casualty event. The person is chosen to stay at an undisclosed secure location, away from events such as State of the Union addresses and presidential inaugurations. The designation of a survivor is intended to prevent the decapitation of the government and to safeguard continuity in the presidency if the president, the vice president, and others in the presidential line of succession die. The procedure began in the 1950s, during the Cold War, with the idea that a nuclear attack could kill government officials and the U.S. government would collapse.

In such an event, the surviving official highest in the line of succession in the Presidential Succession Act of 1947, who might be the designated survivor, would become acting president of the United States. The designated survivor must be eligible to serve as president. The designated survivor usually is a member of the president's Cabinet and is chosen by the president.

The location of the designated survivor is kept confidential, but the designated survivor is not guaranteed to be the person to assume the presidency in such a situation. For the 2010 State of the Union address, Shaun Donovan, the secretary of housing and urban development, was the designated survivor, but Secretary of State Hillary Clinton also was absent from the address, for a conference in London; had a calamity occurred, Clinton, not Donovan, would have become acting president, because her office was higher in the line of succession.

Congress also designates members of the Senate and House (one from each party) to become congressional "designated survivors" to maintain the existence of Congress in a mass-casualty event.

== Selection ==
In a 2016 interview, Jon Favreau, a speechwriter for President Barack Obama, said that the procedure for picking a designated survivor for a State of the Union address was "entirely random", but later clarified that the content of the speech played a role in who was permitted to be absent. Favreau said that for a State of the Union address in which Obama's education policy was a major focus, for example, the secretary of education, Arne Duncan, was not chosen as the designated survivor, because it was thought that he should attend and represent his department.

== List of designated survivors ==
Date	Occasion	Designee	Position	Notes
January 25, 1984	State of the Union	Samuel Pierce	Secretary of Housing and Urban Development	
January 21, 1985	Presidential Inauguration	Margaret Heckler	Secretary of Health and Human Services	
February 6, 1985	State of the Union	Malcolm Baldrige	Secretary of Commerce	
February 4, 1986	State of the Union	John Block	Secretary of Agriculture	
January 27, 1987	State of the Union	Richard Lyng	Secretary of Agriculture	
January 25, 1988	State of the Union	Donald Hodel	Secretary of the Interior	
February 9, 1989	Presidential Address to Joint Session of Congress (Note: 1981, 1989, 1993, 2001, 2009, 2017, 2021 and 2025 speeches were given by incoming presidents and not formal "State of the Union" addresses.)	Lauro Cavazos	Secretary of Education	
January 31, 1990	State of the Union	Edward J. Derwinski	Secretary of Veterans Affairs	
January 29, 1991	State of the Union	Manuel Lujan	Secretary of the Interior	
January 28, 1992	State of the Union	Ed Madigan	Secretary of Agriculture	
February 17, 1993	Presidential Address to Joint Session of Congress	Bruce Babbitt	Secretary of the Interior	
January 25, 1994	State of the Union	Mike Espy	Secretary of Agriculture	
January 24, 1995	State of the Union	Federico Peña	Secretary of Transportation	
January 23, 1996	State of the Union	Donna Shalala	Secretary of Health and Human Services	
February 4, 1997	State of the Union	Dan Glickman	Secretary of Agriculture	
January 27, 1998	State of the Union	William Daley	Secretary of Commerce	
January 19, 1999	State of the Union	Andrew Cuomo	Secretary of Housing and Urban Development	
January 27, 2000	State of the Union	Bill Richardson	Secretary of Energy	
February 27, 2001	Presidential Address to Joint Session of Congress	Anthony Principi	Secretary of Veterans Affairs	
September 20, 2001	Presidential Address to Joint Session of Congress (following the September 11 attacks)	Dick Cheney	Vice President	
September 20, 2001	Presidential Address to Joint Session of Congress (following the September 11 attacks)	Tommy Thompson	Secretary of Health and Human Services	
January 29, 2002	State of the Union	Gale Norton	Secretary of the Interior	
January 28, 2003	State of the Union	John Ashcroft	Attorney General	
January 28, 2003	State of the Union	Norman Mineta	Secretary of Transportation	
January 20, 2004	State of the Union	Donald Evans	Secretary of Commerce	
January 20, 2005	Presidential Inauguration	Gale Norton	Secretary of the Interior	
February 2, 2005	State of the Union	Ted Stevens	President pro tempore of the Senate (Note: For the 2005, 2006, 2016 State of the Union addresses and 2017 Presidential Inauguration, the President pro tempore of the Senate would have been the highest-ranking survivor.)	
February 2, 2005	State of the Union	Donald Evans	Secretary of Commerce	
January 31, 2006	State of the Union	Ted Stevens	President pro tempore of the Senate	
January 31, 2006	State of the Union	Jim Nicholson	Secretary of Veterans Affairs	
January 23, 2007	State of the Union	Alberto Gonzales	Attorney General	
January 28, 2008	State of the Union	Dirk Kempthorne	Secretary of the Interior	
January 20, 2009	Presidential Inauguration	Robert Gates	Secretary of Defense	
February 24, 2009	Presidential Address to Joint Session of Congress	Eric Holder	Attorney General	
September 9, 2009	Presidential Address to Joint Session of Congress (Health Care Speech to Congress)	Steven Chu	Secretary of Energy	
January 27, 2010	State of the Union	Hillary Clinton (Note: While Shaun Donovan was the designated survivor, Hillary Clinton was overseas and was the de facto designated survivor as the most senior person in the line of succession not present.)	Secretary of State	
January 27, 2010	State of the Union	Shaun Donovan	Secretary of Housing and Urban Development	
January 25, 2011	State of the Union	Ken Salazar	Secretary of the Interior	
January 24, 2012	State of the Union	Tom Vilsack	Secretary of Agriculture	
January 21, 2013	Presidential Inauguration	Eric Shinseki	Secretary of Veterans Affairs	
February 12, 2013	State of the Union	Steven Chu	Secretary of Energy	
January 28, 2014	State of the Union	Ernest Moniz	Secretary of Energy	
January 20, 2015	State of the Union	Anthony Foxx	Secretary of Transportation	
January 12, 2016	State of the Union	Orrin Hatch	President pro tempore of the Senate	
January 12, 2016	State of the Union	Jeh Johnson	Secretary of Homeland Security	
January 20, 2017	Presidential Inauguration	Orrin Hatch	President pro tempore of the Senate	
January 20, 2017	Presidential Inauguration	Jeh Johnson	Secretary of Homeland Security	
February 28, 2017	Presidential Address to Joint Session of Congress	David Shulkin	Secretary of Veterans Affairs	
January 30, 2018	State of the Union	Sonny Perdue	Secretary of Agriculture	
February 5, 2019	State of the Union	Rick Perry	Secretary of Energy	
February 4, 2020	State of the Union	David Bernhardt	Secretary of the Interior	
January 20, 2021	Presidential Inauguration	Undisclosed (Note: According to Military.com, outgoing Secretary of State Mike Pompeo was the highest-ranking official in the line of succession who did not attend the inauguration, but it was never officially reported whether he, or anyone else, served as designated survivor.)		
April 28, 2021	Presidential Address to Joint Session of Congress	None (Note: Due to COVID-19 protocols requiring limited attendance, most of the cabinet was not present for the speech and thus no formal designated survivor was named. United States Secretary of the Treasury Janet Yellen was the de facto designated survivor as the most senior person in the line of succession not present.)		
March 1, 2022	State of the Union	Gina Raimondo	Secretary of Commerce	
February 7, 2023	State of the Union	Marty Walsh	Secretary of Labor	
March 7, 2024	State of the Union	Miguel Cardona	Secretary of Education	
January 20, 2025	Presidential Inauguration	None		
March 4, 2025	Presidential Address to Joint Session of Congress	Doug Collins	Secretary of Veterans Affairs	
February 24, 2026	State of the Union	Doug Collins	Secretary of Veterans Affairs	

== See also ==
- Decapitation strike
