= Barack Obama speech to a joint session of Congress =

Barack Obama speech to a joint session of Congress may refer to:

- February 2009 Barack Obama speech to a joint session of Congress, on Tuesday, February 24, 2009, at 9:00 p.m. EST
- September 2009 Barack Obama speech to a joint session of Congress, on Wednesday, September 9, 2009, at 8:00 p.m. EDT
