= 1991 State of the Union Address =

Speech by US President George H. W. Bush

- Full video of the speech as published by the George H. W. Bush Presidential Library
- Date: January 29, 1991
- Time: 9:00 p.m. EST
- Duration: 48 minutes
- Venue: House Chamber, United States Capitol
- Location: Washington, D.C.; 38°53′23″N 77°00′32″W
- Type: State of the Union Address
- Participants: George H. W. Bush; Dan Quayle; Tom Foley
- Previous: 1990 State of the Union Address
- Next: 1992 State of the Union Address

The 1991 State of the Union Address was given by the 41st president of the United States, George H. W. Bush, on January 29, 1991, at 9:00 p.m. EST, in the chamber of the United States House of Representatives to the 102nd United States Congress. It was Bush's second State of the Union Address and his third speech to a joint session of the United States Congress. Presiding over this joint session was the House speaker, Tom Foley, accompanied by Dan Quayle, the vice president, in his capacity as the president of the Senate.

The speech lasted approximately 48 minutes, and contained 3823 words.

The Democratic Party response was delivered by Senator George Mitchell (ME).

Manuel Lujan, the Secretary of the Interior, served as the designated survivor.

The address opens with the President condemning Saddam Hussein's invasion of Kuwait and hailed the end of the Cold War.

In domestic matters, the President advocated for stronger civil rights, his administration enacted the 1991 Civil Rights Act.

Preceded by 1990 State of the Union Address	State of the Union addresses 1991	Succeeded by 1992 State of the Union Address
