= 1994 State of the Union Address =

Speech by US President Bill Clinton

- Full video of the speech as published by the White House
- Date: January 25, 1994
- Time: 9:00 p.m. EST
- Duration: 1 hour, 3 minutes
- Venue: House Chamber, United States Capitol
- Location: Washington, D.C.; 38°53′23″N 77°00′32″W
- Type: State of the Union Address
- Participants: Bill Clinton; Al Gore; Tom Foley
- Previous: 1993 Joint session speech
- Next: 1995 State of the Union Address

The 1994 State of the Union Address was given by the 42nd president of the United States, Bill Clinton, on January 25, 1994, at 9:00 p.m. EST, in the chamber of the United States House of Representatives to the 103rd United States Congress. It was Clinton's first State of the Union Address and his second speech to a joint session of the United States Congress. Presiding over this joint session was House speaker Tom Foley, accompanied by Vice President Al Gore, in his capacity as the president of the Senate.

The president discussed the federal budget deficit, taxes, defense spending, crime, foreign affairs, education, the economy, free trade, the role of government, campaign finance reform, welfare reform, and promoting the Clinton health care plan. President Clinton threatened to veto any legislation that did not guarantee every American private health insurance. He proposed for policies to fight crime: a three strikes law for repeat violent offenders; 100,000 more police officers on the streets; expand gun control to further prevent criminals from being armed and ban assault weapons; additional support for drug treatment and education.

The president began the speech with an acknowledgment of former Speaker Tip O'Neill, who died on January 5, 1994. While discussing additional community policing, the president honored Kevin Jett, a New York City cop attending the address who had been featured in a New York Times story in December 1993.

The speech lasted 63 minutes and consisted of 7,432 words. It was the longest State of the Union speech since Lyndon B. Johnson's 1967 State of the Union Address. Republican Representative Henry Hyde criticized the speech as "interminable".

The Republican Party response was delivered by Senator Bob Dole of Kansas. Dole argued that health care in the United States was not in crisis, the Republican opposition to Clinton's plans in the previous year had been popular, and the deficit reduction was the temporary result of tax increases.

Mike Espy, the Secretary of Agriculture, served as the designated survivor.

Contrary to common belief, Clinton did not have to recite the speech from memory because the teleprompter was loaded with the wrong speech. This had happened the previous year: in a speech Clinton gave to Congress on 22 September 1993 detailing the Clinton health care plan, the teleprompter was loaded with the wrong speech. Specifically, the one he gave to a joint session of Congress on 17 February 1993 shortly after he was sworn in. Teleprompter operators practiced with the old speech and it was accidentally left in, forcing Clinton to ad-lib for almost ten minutes. The two incidents are often conflated. What happened is that President Clinton simply referenced the September 1993 incident.

== See also ==
- 1994 United States House of Representatives elections

Preceded by 1993 joint session speech	State of the Union addresses 1994	Succeeded by 1995 State of the Union Address
