= 1984 State of the Union Address =

Speech by US President Ronald Reagan

- Full video of the speech as published by the Ronald Reagan Presidential Library
- Date: January 25, 1984
- Time: 9:00 p.m. EST
- Duration: 43 minutes
- Venue: House Chamber, United States Capitol
- Location: Washington, D.C.; 38°53′23″N 77°00′32″W
- Type: State of the Union Address
- Participants: Ronald Reagan; George H. W. Bush; Tip O'Neill
- Previous: 1983 State of the Union Address
- Next: 1985 State of the Union Address

The 1984 State of the Union Address was given by the 40th president of the United States, Ronald Reagan, on January 25, 1984, at 9:00 p.m. EST, in the chamber of the United States House of Representatives to the 98th United States Congress. It was Reagan's third State of the Union Address and his fourth speech to a joint session of the United States Congress. Presiding over this joint session was the House speaker, Tip O'Neill, accompanied by George H. W. Bush, the vice president in his capacity as the president of the Senate.

The speech lasted 43 minutes and 2 seconds and contained 4931 words. The address was broadcast live on radio and television.

The Democratic Party response was delivered by Senator Joe Biden (DE), Sen. David Boren (OK), Senator Carl M. Levin (MI), Senator Max S. Baucus (MT), Senator Robert Byrd (WV), Senator Claiborne Pell (RI), Senator Walter Huddleston (KY), Rep. Dante B. Fascell (FL), Rep. Tom Harkin (IA), Rep. William Gray (PA), House Speaker Thomas O’Neill (MA), and Rep. Barbara Boxer (CA).

Samuel Pierce, the Secretary of Housing and Urban Development, served as the designated survivor.

== See also ==
- Speeches and debates of Ronald Reagan
- 1984 United States presidential election

Preceded by 1983 State of the Union Address	State of the Union addresses 1984	Succeeded by 1985 State of the Union Address
