= 1992 State of the Union Address =

Speech by US President George H. W. Bush

- Date: January 28, 1992
- Time: 9:00 p.m. EST
- Duration: 51 minutes
- Venue: House Chamber, United States Capitol
- Location: Washington, D.C.; 38°53′23″N 77°00′32″W
- Type: State of the Union Address
- Participants: George H. W. Bush; Dan Quayle; Tom Foley
- Previous: 1991 State of the Union Address
- Next: 1993 Joint session speech

The 1992 State of the Union Address was given by the 41st president of the United States, George H. W. Bush, on January 28, 1992, at 9:00 p.m. EST, in the chamber of the United States House of Representatives to the 102nd United States Congress. It was Bush's third and final State of the Union Address and his fourth and final speech to a joint session of the United States Congress. Presiding over this joint session was the House speaker, Tom Foley, accompanied by Dan Quayle, the vice president, in his capacity as the president of the Senate.

This was the last State of the Union address by President Bush, who lost his re-election bid to Bill Clinton in the 1992 election.

== Topics ==
The president discussed the collapse of the Soviet Union, Operation Desert Storm, military spending cuts, nuclear disarmament, economic recovery (high unemployment remained from the early 1990s recession), several types of tax cuts and credits, and controlling government spending. Bush listed a nine-point, long-term plan advocating:

1. free trade
2. school choice
3. research and development tax credits and emerging technologies funding
4. anti-crime legislation
5. inner city development
6. privatized health care reform
7. reduction of the federal budget deficit
8. Congress to act on various existing reform proposals
9. efforts to strengthen families

Seeing increased division in American media and politics, Bush denounced election-year partisanship and described the popular sentiment as a passing mood.

== Event ==
The speech lasted 51 minutes and consisted of 5,012 words.

The Democratic Party response was delivered by the Speaker of the House, Representative Tom Foley of Washington. Foley, speaking for 12 minutes, criticized Bush's economic recovery plans as being the same as those that led to the recession and argued for more support of the middle class instead of wealthier Americans.

Edward Madigan, the Secretary of Agriculture, served as the designated survivor.

== See also ==
- 1992 United States presidential election

Preceded by 1991 State of the Union Address	State of the Union addresses 1992	Succeeded by 1993 joint session speech
