= 1987 State of the Union Address =

Speech by US President Ronald Reagan

- Full video of the speech as published by the Ronald Reagan Presidential Library
- Date: January 27, 1987
- Time: 9:00 p.m. EST
- Duration: 34 minutes
- Venue: House Chamber, United States Capitol
- Location: Washington, D.C.; 38°53′23″N 77°00′32″W
- Type: State of the Union Address
- Participants: Ronald Reagan; George H. W. Bush; Jim Wright
- Previous: 1986 State of the Union Address
- Next: 1988 State of the Union Address

The 1987 State of the Union Address was given by the 40th president of the United States, Ronald Reagan, on January 27, 1987, at 9:00 p.m. EST, in the chamber of the United States House of Representatives to the 100th United States Congress. It was Reagan's sixth State of the Union Address and his seventh speech to a joint session of the United States Congress. Presiding over this joint session was the House speaker, Jim Wright, accompanied by George H. W. Bush, the vice president in his capacity as the president of the Senate.

Progressing to the Afghanistan situation, he says: "The Soviet Union says it wants a peaceful settlement in Afghanistan, yet it continues a brutal war and props up a regime whose days are clearly numbered. We are ready to support a political solution that guarantees the rapid withdrawal of all Soviet troops and genuine self-determination for the Afghan people." He ended with, "But now at length I have the happiness to know that it is a rising and not a setting Sun." Well, you can bet it's rising because, my fellow citizens, America isn't finished. Her best days have just begun." The speech lasted 34 minutes and 39 seconds and contained 3847 words. The address was broadcast live on radio and television. The Democratic Party response was delivered by Senator Robert Byrd (WV), and House Speaker Jim Wright (TX)

Richard Lyng, the Secretary of Agriculture, served as the designated survivor.

== See also ==
- Speeches and debates of Ronald Reagan

Preceded by 1986 State of the Union Address	State of the Union addresses 1987	Succeeded by 1988 State of the Union Address
