= 1995 State of the Union Address =

Speech by US President Bill Clinton

- Full video of the speech as published by the White House
- Date: January 24, 1995
- Time: 9:00 p.m. EST
- Duration: 1 hour, 24 minutes
- Venue: House Chamber, United States Capitol
- Location: Washington, D.C.; 38°53′23″N 77°00′32″W
- Type: State of the Union Address
- Participants: Bill Clinton; Al Gore; Newt Gingrich
- Previous: 1994 State of the Union Address
- Next: 1996 State of the Union Address

The 1995 State of the Union Address was given by the 42nd president of the United States, Bill Clinton, on January 24, 1995, at 9:00 p.m. EST, in the chamber of the United States House of Representatives to the 104th United States Congress. It was Clinton's second State of the Union Address and his third speech to a joint session of the United States Congress. Presiding over this joint session was the House speaker, Newt Gingrich, accompanied by Al Gore, the vice president, in his capacity as the president of the Senate.

It was the first address to a Republican-controlled Congress since 1954. This was also the first time a Republican Speaker sat in the chair since 1954.

The president discussed his proposals of a New Covenant vision for a smaller government and proposing tax reductions. The president also discussed crime, the Brady Bill and the Assault Weapons Ban, illegal immigration, and the minimum wage. Regarding foreign policy, he urged assistance in Mexico's economic crisis, additional disarmament in cooperation with Russia and other international treaties, stopping North Korea's nuclear weapons program, legislation to fight terrorists, and peace between Israel and its neighbors. Discussion of the failed attempt to overhaul health care was refocused on more limited efforts to protect coverage for those who have health insurance and expand coverage for children.

The speech lasted nearly 1 hour and 25 minutes and consisted of 9,190 words. In terms of word count it is the longest State of the Union speech in history.

The president acknowledged many Americans of past and present in his speech. Among them were:

- Newt Gingrich, the new Speaker of the House
- Ronald Reagan, who similarly had been president while Congress was controlled by the opposing party; also in the past year he announced his Alzheimer's disease diagnosis
- Jacklyn H. Lucas, who was awarded the Medal of Honor for his actions during World War II

The Republican Party response was delivered by Governor Christine Todd Whitman of New Jersey. This was the first response given exclusively by a state governor and, delivered in Trenton, the first outside Washington, DC.

Conservative William Kristol called the address the "most conservative State of the Union by a Democratic president in history."

Federico Peña, the Secretary of Transportation, served as the designated survivor.

== Immigration ==
In his 1995 State of the Union address, President Bill Clinton said: “All Americans ... are rightly disturbed by the large numbers of illegal aliens entering our country. The jobs they hold might otherwise be held by citizens or legal immigrants. The public service they use impose burdens on our taxpayers.”

== See also ==
- Republican Revolution

Preceded by 1994 State of the Union Address	State of the Union addresses 1995	Succeeded by 1996 State of the Union Address
