= 1985 State of the Union Address =

Speech by US President Ronald Reagan

- Full video of the speech as published by the Ronald Reagan Presidential Library
- Date: February 6, 1985
- Time: 9:00 p.m. EST
- Duration: 40 minutes
- Venue: House Chamber, United States Capitol
- Location: Washington, D.C.; 38°53′23″N 77°00′32″W
- Type: State of the Union Address
- Participants: Ronald Reagan; George H. W. Bush; Tip O'Neill
- Previous: 1984 State of the Union Address
- Next: 1986 State of the Union Address

The 1985 State of the Union Address was given by the 40th president of the United States, Ronald Reagan, on February 6, 1985 — Reagan’s 74th birthday — at 9:00 p.m. EST, in the chamber of the United States House of Representatives to the 99th United States Congress. It was Reagan's fourth State of the Union Address and his fifth speech to a joint session of the United States Congress. Presiding over this joint session was the House speaker, Tip O'Neill, accompanied by George H. W. Bush, the vice president in his capacity as the president of the Senate.

He stated, "Our progress began not in Washington, DC, but in the hearts of our families, communities, workplaces, and voluntary groups which, together, are unleashing the invincible spirit of one great nation under God." He believed that volunteerism was a key element to the American community.

The president proclaimed the Reagan Doctrine, announcing support for military and other aid to forces fighting to overthrow governments in select countries around the world, and specifically for armed groups fighting to overthrow the Central American government of Nicaragua, claiming that "support for freedom fighters is self-defense." He also spoke of the plans to develop a weapons program referred to as the Strategic Defense Initiative. On the domestic front, he spoke at length of the need to reduce the government's role in advancing people's lives and the economy and for reducing the federal deficit, and of his opposition to abortion, among other things.

The speech lasted approximately 40 minutes and consisted of 4,955 words. The address was broadcast live on radio and television.

After the joint session was dissolved, House Minority Leader Robert H. Michel led the members of the House of Representatives and Senate in singing Happy Birthday to President Reagan.

The Democratic Party response was delivered by Governor Bill Clinton of Arkansas (who himself later became president in 1993), Governor Bob Graham of Florida and House Speaker Tip O'Neill.

Malcolm Baldrige, the Secretary of Commerce, served as the designated survivor.

== See also ==
- Speeches and debates of Ronald Reagan
- 1984 United States presidential election

Preceded by 1984 State of the Union Address	State of the Union addresses 1985	Succeeded by 1986 State of the Union Address
