= Astrid Silva =

American activist

Astrid Silva is an immigration activist in the United States. Originally from Mexico, she has lived in Nevada since she was four years old. She is the co-founder of the Dream Big Vegas organization.

She illegally immigrated to the United States at the age of four, crossing the Rio Grande with her mother. Carrying little more than the clothes on her back, Silva learned to speak English by watching PBS and reading newspapers.

Her political activism began by passing hand-written notes to Harry Reid, who was the Democratic Senator of Nevada in 2009. Barack Obama noted her journey in a national address on November 20, 2014. She worked on the campaign of Hillary Clinton in 2016. Nevada House of Representatives member Ruben Kihuen invited Silva to attend the 2018 State of the Union event.
