= 1990 State of the Union Address =

Speech by US President George H. W. Bush

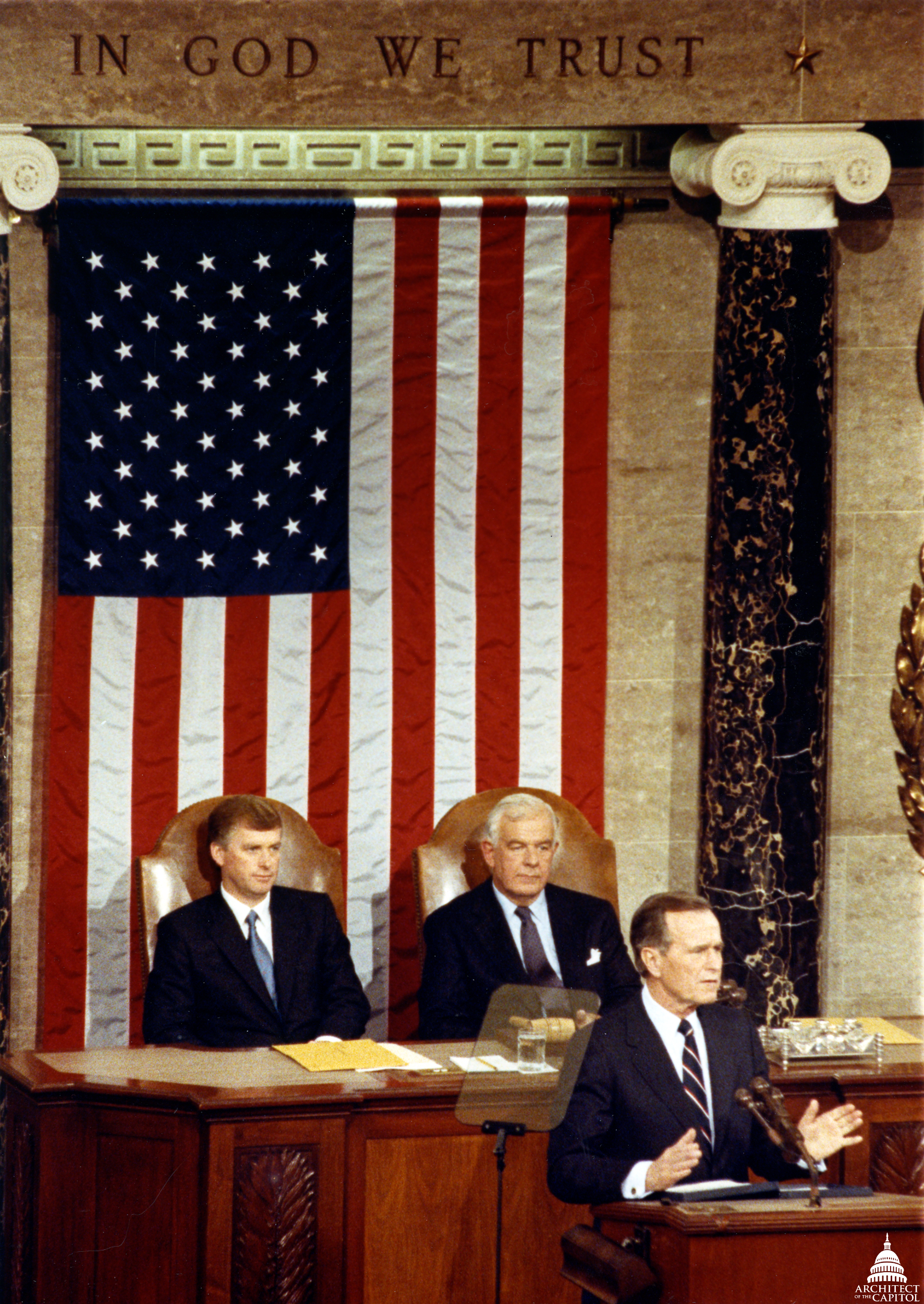
- President George H. W. Bush delivering the address. Sitting behind Bush are Vice President Dan Quayle and House Speaker Tom Foley.
- Date: January 31, 1990
- Time: 9:00 p.m. EST
- Duration: 35 minutes
- Venue: House Chamber, United States Capitol
- Location: Washington, D.C.; 38°53′23″N 77°00′32″W
- Type: State of the Union Address
- Participants: George H. W. Bush; Dan Quayle; Tom Foley
- Previous: 1989 Joint session speech
- Next: 1991 State of the Union Address

The 1990 State of the Union Address was given by the 41st president of the United States, George H. W. Bush, on January 31, 1990, at 9:00 p.m. EST, in the chamber of the United States House of Representatives to the 101st United States Congress. It was Bush's first State of the Union Address and his second speech to a joint session of the United States Congress. Presiding over this joint session was the House speaker, Tom Foley, accompanied by Dan Quayle, the vice president, in his capacity as the president of the Senate.

The speech lasted 35 minutes and 43 seconds. and contained 3777 words.

The Democratic Party response was delivered by House Speaker Tom Foley (WA).

Edward J. Derwinski, the Secretary of Veterans Affairs, served as the designated survivor.

In foreign affairs, the President hailed the success of Operation Just Cause in Panama.

In domestic affairs, the President supported a new initiative called the Family Savings Plan and a home ownership program called HOPE.

== See also ==
- 1990 United States House of Representatives elections

Preceded by 1989 joint session speech	State of the Union addresses 1990	Succeeded by 1991 State of the Union Address
