= 1996 State of the Union Address =

Speech by US President Bill Clinton

- Full video of the speech as published by the White House
- Date: January 23, 1996
- Time: 9:00 p.m. EST
- Duration: 1 hour, 6 minutes
- Venue: House Chamber, United States Capitol
- Location: Washington, D.C.; 38°53′23″N 77°00′32″W
- Type: State of the Union Address
- Participants: Bill Clinton; Al Gore; Newt Gingrich
- Previous: 1995 State of the Union Address
- Next: 1997 State of the Union Address

The 1996 State of the Union Address was given by the 42nd president of the United States, Bill Clinton, on January 23, 1996, at 9:00 p.m. EST, in the chamber of the United States House of Representatives to the 104th United States Congress. It was Clinton's third State of the Union Address and his fourth speech to a joint session of the United States Congress. Presiding over this joint session was the House speaker, Newt Gingrich, accompanied by Al Gore, the vice president, in his capacity as the president of the Senate.

This speech occurred shortly after the federal government shutdown of 1995 and 1996 which had resulted from disagreements on the 1996 United States federal budget.

President Clinton discussed the economy and declared that "the era of big government is over," and continued, "but we cannot go back to the time when our citizens were left to fend for themselves. We must go forward as one America, one nation working together, to meet the challenges we face together. Self-reliance and teamwork are not opposing virtues -- we must have both." The president discussed welfare reform, the V-chip, education, community policing, crime, the environment, foreign relations, and the federal budget.

The Republican Party response was delivered by Senate Majority Leader Bob Dole of Kansas (who would go on to face Clinton in the 1996 presidential election). Dole stated that "[President Clinton] is the chief obstacle to a balanced budget and the balanced budget amendment... While the President's words speak of change, his deeds are a contradiction. President Clinton claims to embrace the future while clinging to the policies of the past."

Donna Shalala, the Secretary of Health and Human Services, served as the designated survivor.

== See also ==
- 1996 United States presidential election

Preceded by 1995 State of the Union Address	State of the Union addresses 1996	Succeeded by 1997 State of the Union Address
