= September 1993 Bill Clinton speech to a joint session of Congress =

- Full video of the speech as published by the White House
- Date: September 22, 1993
- Time: 9:00 p.m. EST
- Venue: House Chamber, United States Capitol
- Location: Washington, D.C.; 38°53′23″N 77°00′32″W
- Type: Health care reform
- Participants: Bill Clinton; Al Gore; Tom Foley

Bill Clinton, the 42nd president of the United States, discussed his plan for health care reform in a speech delivered to a joint session of the 103rd United States Congress on September 22, 1993, at 9:00 PM (EDT). The speech was delivered to Congress on the floor of the chamber of the United States House of Representatives in the United States Capitol. House speaker Tom Foley presided over the joint session and was accompanied by the president of the United States Senate, Al Gore, the vice president of the United States.
