= September 2001 George W. Bush speech to a joint session of Congress =

- Full video of the speech
- Date: September 20, 2001
- Time: 8:00 p.m. EST
- Duration: 35 minutes
- Venue: House Chamber, United States Capitol
- Location: Washington, D.C.; 38°53′23″N 77°00′32″W
- Type: September 11 attacks response
- Participants: George W. Bush; Robert Byrd; Dennis Hastert

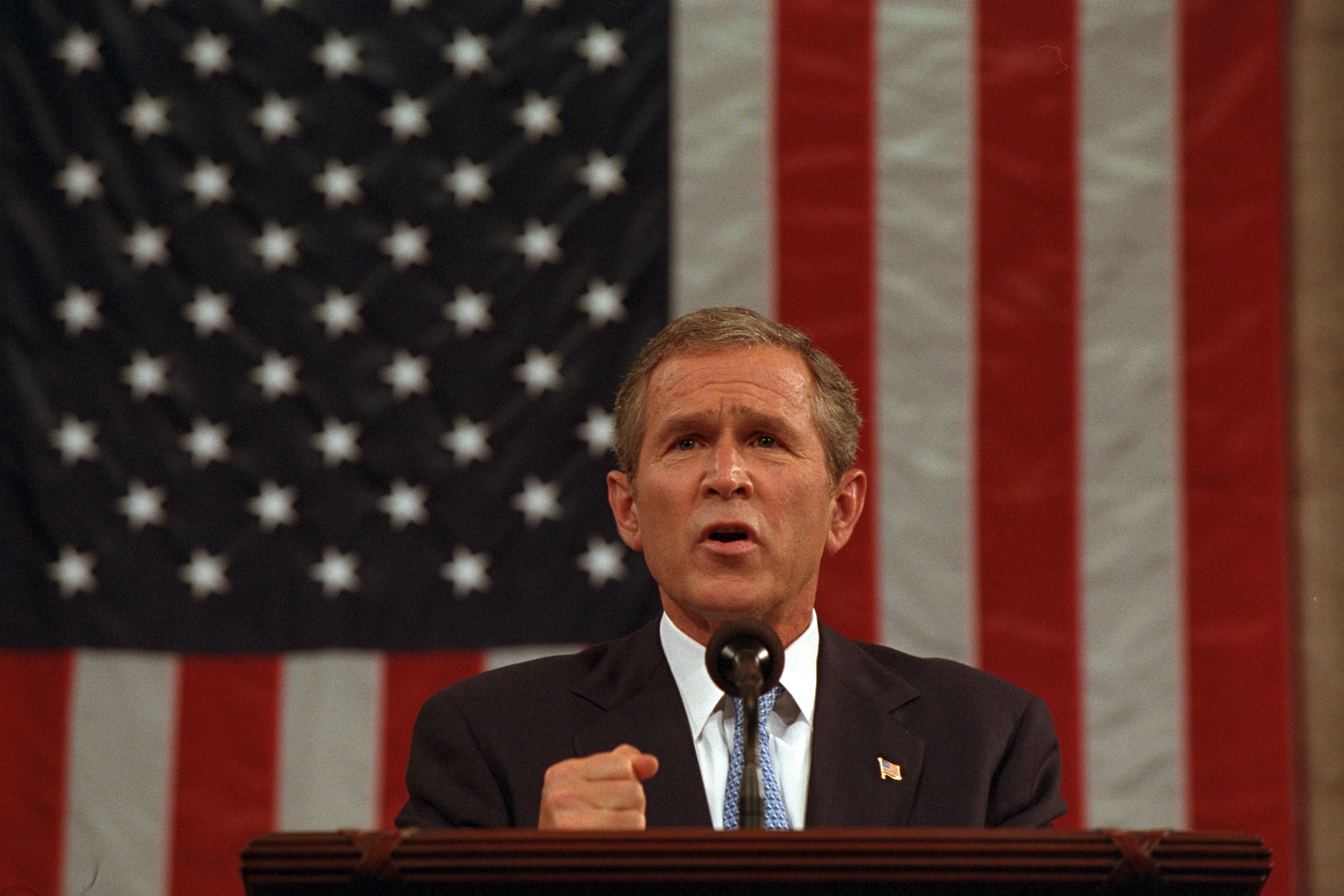
Bush delivering the speech

George W. Bush, the 43rd president of the United States, announced the investigation in a speech delivered to a joint session of the 107th United States Congress on September 20, 2001, following the coordinated attacks on September 11. It was considered one of the most important events during his first term (2001–2005) and demonstrated his future policies to deal with the dangers facing the United States at that time, represented by terrorism and weapons of mass destruction. In attendance was British prime minister Tony Blair who expressed his solidarity. On October 7, 2001, a coalition led by the United States military began an invasion of Afghanistan that would lead to the overthrow of the Taliban government. The president described the coming war as a battle between good and evil. The speech is considered an announcement of the beginning of the Global War on Terrorism.

== Overview ==
Bush condemned the actions of the "Taliban regime", saying that it "not only oppresses its own citizens but also threatens people everywhere as it sponsors, harbors, and supplies terrorists, and aids and abets in murder". He demanded the handover of al-Qaeda leaders.

== See also ==
- Aftermath of the September 11 attacks
