= September 2009 Barack Obama speech to a joint session of Congress =

Speech on American health care reform

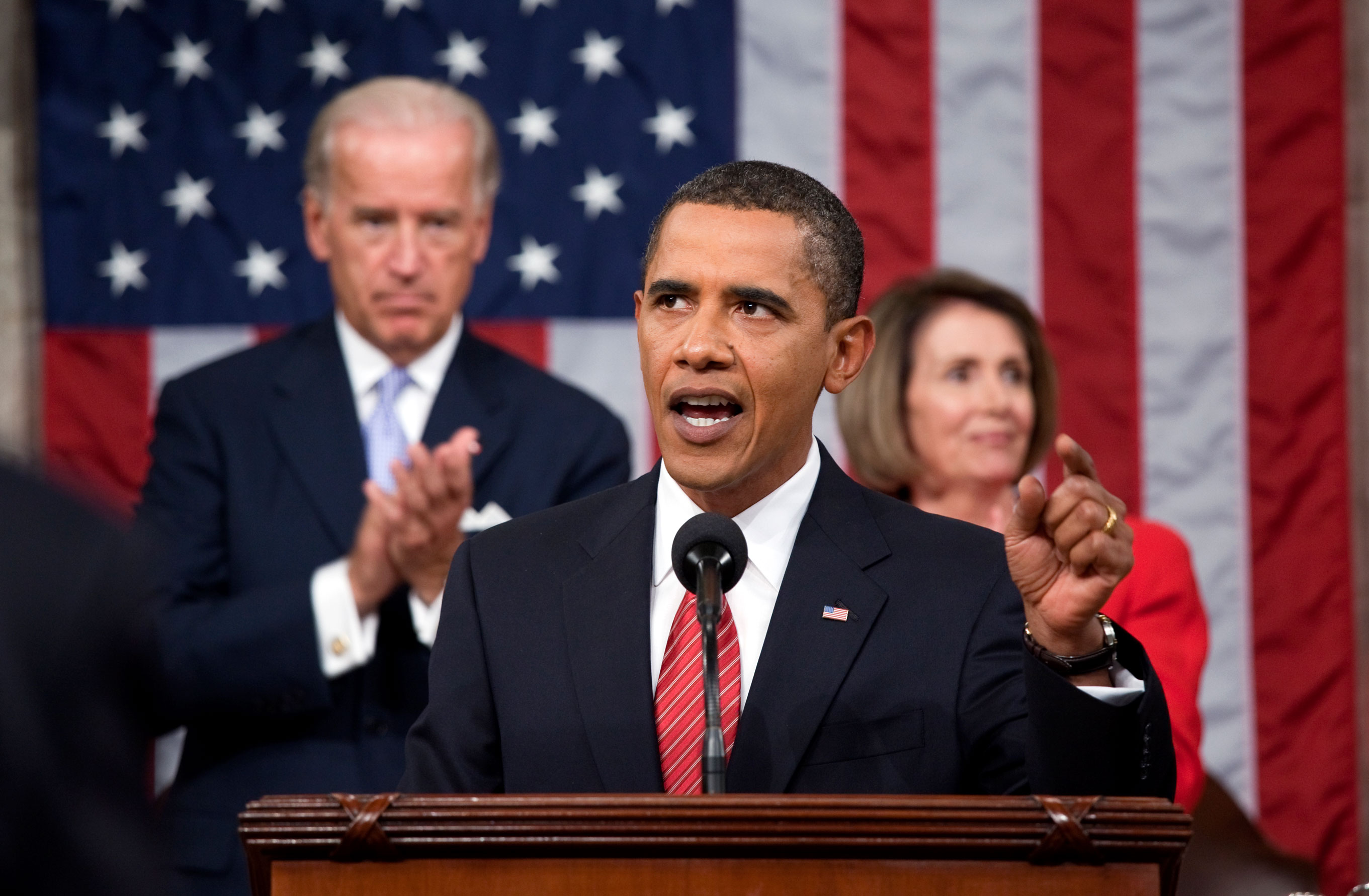
- Date: September 9, 2009
- Time: 8:00 p.m. EDT
- Venue: House Chamber, United States Capitol
- Location: Washington, D.C.; 38°53′23″N 77°00′32″W
- Type: Health care reform
- Participants: Barack Obama; Joe Biden; Nancy Pelosi

Barack Obama, the 44th President of the United States, discussed his plan for health care reform in a speech delivered to a joint session of the 111th United States Congress on Wednesday, September 9, 2009, at 8:00 p.m. (EDT). The speech was delivered to Congress on the floor of the chamber of the United States House of Representatives in the United States Capitol. House Speaker Nancy Pelosi presided over the joint session and was accompanied by the President of the United States Senate, Joe Biden, the Vice President of the United States. Energy Secretary Steven Chu was chosen as the designated survivor and did not attend the speech.

== Speech ==
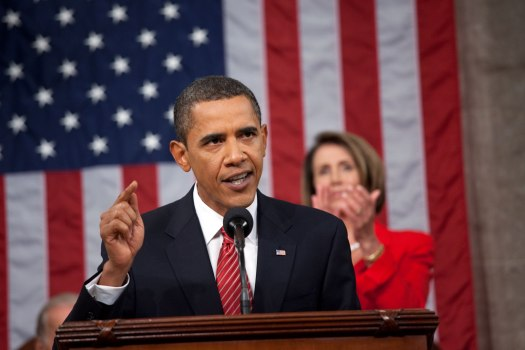
President Obama delivering his speech on health care to the United States Congress

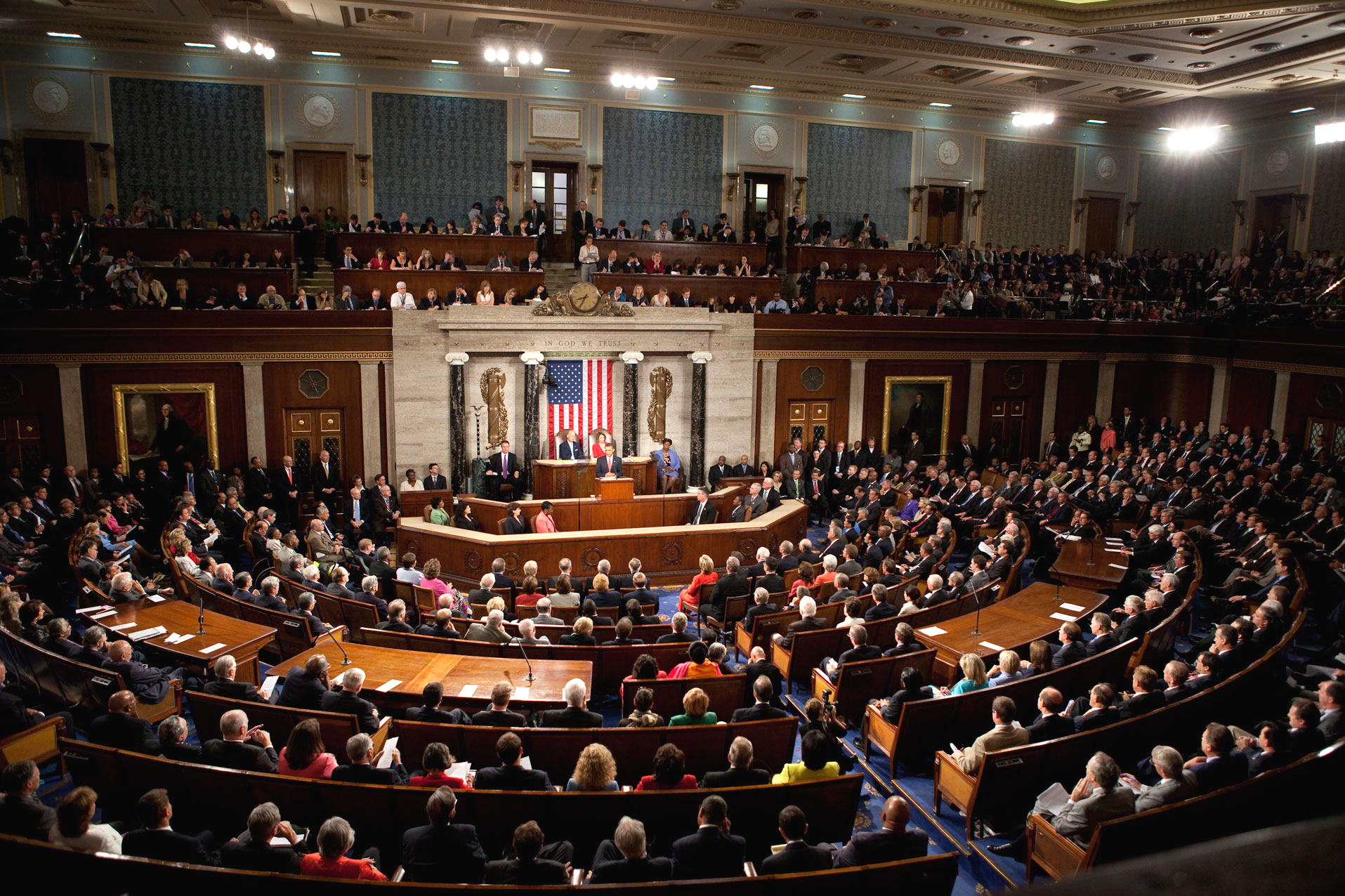
Obama addresses a joint session of Congress

Obama's speech addressed topics regarding the public health insurance option, private insurance reform, estimated costs and revenue, basic coverage for individuals and employers, as well as subsidies and waivers for those who can't afford coverage, and the importance of tort reform in bringing costs down. The President's speech lasted 47 minutes and contained 5,614 words. It was briefly interrupted by a cry of "You lie!" from Republican Rep. Joe Wilson, referring to a statement by Obama that his plan would not apply to illegal immigrants (discussed in more detail in the next section).

Obama quoted a letter sent to him from Ted Kennedy, who had died a few weeks earlier. Kennedy had composed the letter after he was diagnosed with terminal brain cancer, and requested that the letter be sent after he died. Quoting Kennedy's letter, Obama said, "that what we face is above all a moral issue; that at stake are not just the details of policy, but fundamental principles of social justice and the character of our country."

In the quoted portions of his letter, Kennedy, a steadfast proponent of health care reform, also posed the question of what would happen if one knew treatment existed for a condition but one could not afford it.

President Obama placed health care reform into a broader historical perspective, in which the nature and role of government has been the subject of historical debate, and compared his reform to Social Security and Medicare. He concluded his address by returning to Kennedy's theme of the "character of our country":

I understand how difficult this health care debate has been. I know that many in this country are deeply skeptical that government is looking out for them. I understand that the politically safe move would be to kick the can further down the road - to defer reform one more year, or one more election, or one more term. But that's not what the moment calls for. That's not what we came here to do. We did not come to fear the future. We came here to shape it. I still believe we can act even when it's hard. I still believe we can replace acrimony with civility, and gridlock with progress. I still believe we can do great things, and that here and now we will meet history's test. Because that is who we are. That is our calling. That is our character.

== Reactions ==
=== Outburst by Joe Wilson ===
Wilson's interruption of President Obama's address (at 00:15)

During the speech, the president discussed the health coverage of illegal immigrants, saying: "There are also those who claim that our reform efforts would insure illegal immigrants. This, too, is false. The reforms I'm proposing would not apply to those who are here illegally." At this point, South Carolina Republican Rep. Joe Wilson yelled "You lie!", briefly interrupting the speech. Wilson later issued a statement apologizing for his outburst. On September 15, the House approved a "resolution of disapproval" (a reprimand as opposed to formal censure) against Wilson, on a near party-line 240–179 vote.

The outburst led to media coverage about the issue. Various sources noted that the House bill denies direct benefits, such as affordability credits, to illegal immigrants. Section 246 of the bill, titled "NO FEDERAL PAYMENT FOR UNDOCUMENTED ALIENS," states: "Nothing in this subtitle shall allow Federal payments for affordability credits on behalf of individuals who are not lawfully present in the United States." The bill did, however, require some to purchase health insurance who were not explicitly restricted from the proposed Health Insurance Exchange. The Obama administration later stated that, in the final bill, these people would not be able to participate in the Exchange. Specific language was subsequently included when the Senate healthcare-reform plan was introduced on September 16 which prohibits participation in the insurance exchange by persons not lawfully present in the U.S.

=== Republican response ===
The official, post-speech Republican response was given by Congressman Charles Boustany of Louisiana, a former cardiothoracic surgeon.

With few notable exceptions, Congressional Republicans were silent as their Democratic colleagues applauded various points Obama made during the course of the speech. Republicans also held up copies of the health care bills in objection when Obama spoke and others laughed when Obama said that there are "significant details" to be worked out before a health overhaul can be passed.

=== Critical reception ===
BBC News called Obama's health care speech "one of the most important speeches of his presidency." The Economist called the speech a "success on several measures". Calling it a triumph of speech writing, Time magazine praised the speech for its clarity, brevity and limited use of jargon. Other media outlets felt the speech was "too little, too late" to make a difference in the outcome of the health care debate.

=== Financial markets ===
The shares of health insurance companies advanced after analysts concluded that the proposal outlined by Obama as good news for healthcare investors. Citi analyst Charles Boorady was quoted as saying that he expected shares to rise further as passage of health care reform would expand enrollment in plans.
