= 1988 State of the Union Address =

Speech by US President Ronald Reagan

- Full video of the speech as published by the Ronald Reagan Presidential Library
- Date: January 25, 1988
- Time: 9:00 p.m. EST
- Duration: 44 minutes
- Venue: House Chamber, United States Capitol
- Location: Washington, D.C.; 38°53′23″N 77°00′32″W
- Type: State of the Union Address
- Participants: Ronald Reagan; George H. W. Bush; Jim Wright
- Previous: 1987 State of the Union Address
- Next: 1989 Joint session speech

The 1988 State of the Union Address was given by the 40th president of the United States, Ronald Reagan, on January 25, 1988, at 9:00 p.m. EST, in the chamber of the United States House of Representatives to the 100th United States Congress. It was Reagan's seventh and final State of the Union Address and his eighth and final speech to a joint session of the United States Congress. Presiding over this joint session was the House speaker, Jim Wright, accompanied by George H. W. Bush, the vice president in his capacity as the president of the Senate.

Donald Hodel, the Secretary of the Interior, served as the designated survivor.

== Summary ==
President Reagan began by announcing that his speech would not be a litany of achievements over the past seven years of his administration, but that he would continue to propose policy initiatives. He outlined the following objectives:

1. Keep the economy strong and growing
2. Review the state of social programs
3. Continue spreading democracy around the world
4. Maintain a strong defense

Reagan discussed the federal deficit, the size of the federal budget, abortion, crime, drugs, the line-item veto, foreign relations and the Soviet–Afghan War. He famously summarized the effect of government intervention on the poor:

Some years ago the federal government declared War on Poverty, and poverty won. Today the federal government has 59 major welfare programs and spends more than $100 billion a year on them. What has all this money done? Well, too often it has made poverty harder to escape. Federal welfare programs have created a massive social problem. With the best of intentions, government created a poverty trap that wreaks havoc on the very support system the poor need most to lift themselves out of poverty: the family.

In closing he returned to his vision of America as a city on a hill: "We can be proud ... that another generation of Americans has protected and passed on lovingly this place called America, this shining city on a hill, this government of, by, and for the people."

The speech lasted approximately 44 minutes and consisted of 4,955 words. The address was broadcast live on radio and television.

== Opposition response ==
The Democratic Party response was delivered by Senate Majority Leader Robert Byrd of West Virginia and Speaker of the House Jim Wright of Texas.

== See also ==
- Speeches and debates of Ronald Reagan
- 1988 United States presidential election

Preceded by 1987 State of the Union Address	State of the Union addresses 1988	Succeeded by 1989 joint session speech
