= 1993 Bill Clinton speech to a joint session of Congress =

Speech by US President Bill Clinton

- Full video of the speech as published by the White House
- Date: February 17, 1993
- Time: 9:00 p.m. EST
- Duration: 1 hour, 5 minutes
- Venue: House Chamber, United States Capitol
- Location: Washington, D.C.; 38°53′23″N 77°00′32″W
- Type: Unofficial State of the Union Address
- Participants: Bill Clinton; Al Gore; Tom Foley
- Previous: 1992 State of the Union Address
- Next: 1994 State of the Union Address

Bill Clinton, the 42nd president of the United States, addressed a joint session of the United States Congress on Wednesday, February 17, 1993. It was his first public address before a joint session. Like a State of the Union Address, it was delivered before the 103rd United States Congress in the Chamber of the United States House of Representatives in the United States Capitol. Presiding over this joint session was the House speaker, Tom Foley, accompanied by Al Gore, the vice president in his capacity as the president of the Senate.

The speech was referred to as the presidential economic address or the address on administration goals. During his speech, President Clinton proposed tax increases and spending cuts intended to reduce the federal deficit by 38 percent over four years while revitalizing the nation's economy. The President hailed the upcoming completion of the North American Free Trade Agreement.

Secretary of the Interior Bruce Babbitt was the designated survivor and did not attend the address in order to maintain a continuity of government.

== Republican response ==
House Minority Leader Bob Michel of Illinois delivered the Republican response to the address.

== See also ==
- First 100 days of the Clinton presidency
- List of joint sessions of the United States Congress

Preceded by 1992 State of the Union Address	State of the Union addresses 1993 joint session speech	Succeeded by 1994 State of the Union Address
