= 1986 State of the Union Address =

Speech by US President Ronald Reagan

- Full video of the speech as published by the Ronald Reagan Presidential Library
- Date: February 4, 1986
- Time: 9:00 p.m. EST
- Duration: 31 minutes
- Venue: House Chamber, United States Capitol
- Location: Washington, D.C.; 38°53′23″N 77°00′32″W
- Type: State of the Union Address
- Participants: Ronald Reagan; George H. W. Bush; Tip O'Neill
- Previous: 1985 State of the Union Address
- Next: 1987 State of the Union Address

The 1986 State of the Union Address was given by the 40th president of the United States, Ronald Reagan, on February 4, 1986, at 9:00 p.m. EST, in the chamber of the United States House of Representatives to the 99th United States Congress. It was Reagan's fifth State of the Union Address and his sixth speech to a joint session of the United States Congress. Presiding over this joint session was the House speaker, Tip O'Neill, accompanied by George H. W. Bush, the vice president in his capacity as the president of the Senate.

Economic growth, increased job opportunities, and falling inflation rates were among some of the key issues discussed in this address. Reagan advocated for both an increase in national defense and a reevaluation of the federal budget, arguing the importance of national security and economic stability by appealing to American family values. In addition, the speech addressed welfare issues and proposed that new programs be created to support poor families. Reagan also asked that he be given the authority of a line-item veto. The speech lasted approximately 31 minutes and contained 3,514 words. The address was broadcast live on radio and television.

This was the first State of the Union Address to have been postponed from its original date. Reagan planned to give his address on Tuesday, January 28, 1986, but after learning of the Space Shuttle Challenger disaster, he postponed it for a week and addressed the nation on the day's events. Reagan delivered a much shorter address to the nation, focused solely upon the tragic events of the Challenger disaster, which served as an explanation for the delay of the speech. Reagan justified this delay by stating that “today is a day for mourning and remembering,” inviting the nation to devote the day to recognizing what he defined as “truly a national loss.”

As a continuation of the tradition President Reagan started at the delivery of his State of the Union Address in 1982, he invited hand-selected special guests to be present during the speech. These four guests included Tyrone Ford, a 12-year-old with a talent in gospel music, 13-year-old Trevor Ferrell, who took an initiative to support the homeless, 13-year-old Shelby Butler, who risked her own life to save a classmate from oncoming traffic, and Richard Cavoli, a student of science who had designed an experiment that had been carried aboard Space Shuttle Challenger. These four guests were chosen because President Reagan saw them as everyday examples of young heroes in America. Each of these individuals was mentioned directly during the speech.

The Democratic Party response was delivered by Senator George Mitchell (ME), Lt. Gov. Harriett Woods (MO), Gov. Charles Robb (VA), Rep. Thomas Daschle (SD), and Rep. William Gray (PA), who had previously taken part in the group response to President Reagan's State of the Union Address delivered on January 25, 1984.

== See also ==
- Speeches and debates of Ronald Reagan
- 1986 United States House of Representatives elections

Preceded by 1985 State of the Union Address	State of the Union addresses 1986	Succeeded by 1987 State of the Union Address
