= 2009 Barack Obama speech to a joint session of Congress =

Speech by US President Barack Obama

- Full video of the speech as published by the White House
- Date: February 24, 2009
- Time: 9:00 p.m. EST
- Duration: 51 minutes
- Venue: House Chamber, United States Capitol
- Location: Washington, D.C.; 38°53′23″N 77°00′32″W
- Type: Unofficial State of the Union Address
- Participants: Barack Obama; Joe Biden; Nancy Pelosi
- Footage: C-SPAN
- Previous: 2008 State of the Union Address
- Next: 2010 State of the Union Address
- Website: Full text by Archives.gov

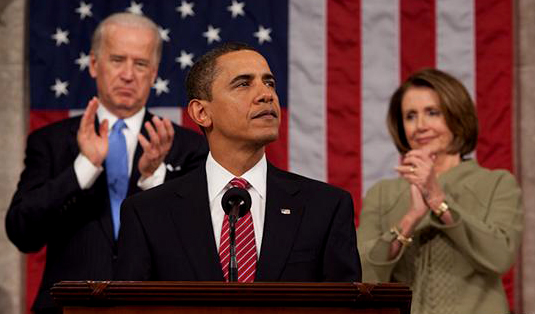
President Barack Obama addressing the Congress, with Vice President Joe Biden and House Speaker Nancy Pelosi

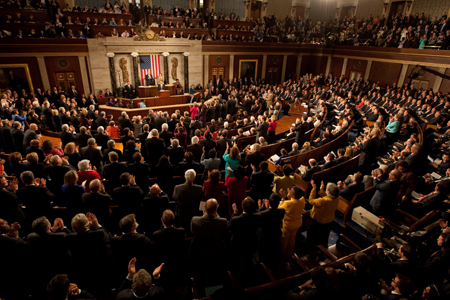
View from the Executive Gallery of the House Chamber

Barack Obama, the 44th president of the United States, addressed a joint session of the United States Congress on Tuesday, February 24, 2009, at 9:00 p.m. EST. It was his first public address before a joint session. Like a State of the Union Address, it was delivered before the 111th United States Congress in the Chamber of the United States House of Representatives in the United States Capitol. Presiding over this joint session was the House speaker, Nancy Pelosi, accompanied by Joe Biden, the vice president in his capacity as the president of the Senate.

During his speech, President Obama discussed the recently passed $787 billion American Recovery and Reinvestment Act of 2009 as well as the Troubled Assets Relief Program, the state of the economy, and the future of the country.

Attorney General Eric Holder was the designated survivor and did not attend the address in order to maintain a continuity of government. He was sequestered at a secret secure location for the duration of the event.

== Republican response ==
Louisiana Governor Bobby Jindal delivered the Republican response to the address, calling Obama's stimulus plan irresponsible. Jindal's response received criticism from both Democrats and some Republicans.

== See also ==
- First 100 days of the Obama presidency
- List of joint sessions of the United States Congress

Preceded by 2008 State of the Union Address	State of the Union addresses 2009 joint session speech	Succeeded by 2010 State of the Union Address
