= 1989 George H. W. Bush speech to a joint session of Congress =

Speech by US President George H. W. Bush

- Date: February 9, 1989
- Time: 9:00 p.m. EST
- Duration: 48 minutes
- Venue: House Chamber, United States Capitol
- Location: Washington, D.C.; 38°53′23″N 77°00′32″W
- Type: Unofficial State of the Union Address
- Participants: George H. W. Bush; Dan Quayle; Jim Wright
- Previous: 1988 State of the Union Address
- Next: 1990 State of the Union Address

George H. W. Bush, the 41st president of the United States, addressed a joint session of the United States Congress on Wednesday, February 9, 1989. It was his first public address before a joint session of Congress - 1989 CSPAN February 10, 2019 8:00pm-9:01pm EST. Like a State of the Union Address, it was delivered before the 101st United States Congress in the Chamber of the United States House of Representatives in the United States Capitol. Presiding over this joint session was the House speaker, Jim Wright, accompanied by Dan Quayle, the vice president in his capacity as the president of the Senate.

The speech is referred to as the presidential economic address or the address on administration goals. During his speech, President Bush presented his proposed federal budget.

Secretary of Education Lauro Cavazos was the designated survivor and did not attend the address in order to maintain a continuity of government.

In domestic matters, the President announced $2.2 billion in new funding for the National Science Foundation, increased funding for NASA and education by creating the concept of merit schools. In addition, he announced improvements to the Clean Air Act and advocated for resource exploration in the Alaska National Wildlife Refuge.

In foreign policy, the President emphasized his support for the Strategic Defense Initiative.

== Democratic response ==
Speaker of the House Jim Wright and Senator Lloyd Bentsen, both of Texas, delivered the Democratic response to the address.

== See also ==
- First 100 days of the George H. W. Bush presidency
- List of joint sessions of the United States Congress

Preceded by 1988 State of the Union Address	State of the Union addresses 1989 joint session speech	Succeeded by 1990 State of the Union Address
