= 2008 State of the Union Address =

Speech by US President George W. Bush

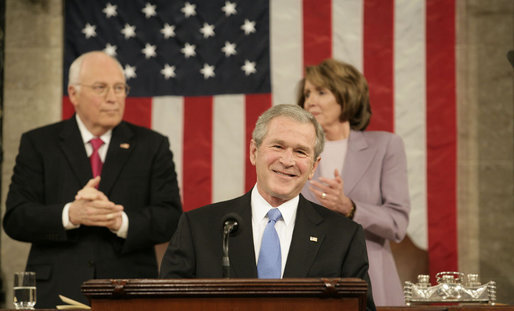
- President George W. Bush during the speech, with Vice President Dick Cheney and House Speaker Nancy Pelosi behind him
- Date: January 28, 2008
- Time: 9:00 p.m. EST
- Duration: 52 minutes
- Venue: House Chamber, United States Capitol
- Location: Washington, D.C.; 38°53′19.8″N 77°00′32.8″W
- Type: State of the Union Address
- Participants: George W. Bush; Dick Cheney; Nancy Pelosi
- Previous: 2007 State of the Union Address
- Next: 2009 Joint session speech

The 2008 State of the Union Address was given by the 43rd president of the United States, George W. Bush, on January 28, 2008, at 9:00 p.m. EST, in the chamber of the United States House of Representatives to the 110th United States Congress. It was Bush's seventh and final State of the Union Address and his eighth and final speech to a joint session of the United States Congress. Presiding over this joint session was the House speaker, Nancy Pelosi, accompanied by Dick Cheney, the vice president, in his capacity as the president of the Senate.

2008 State of the Union Address
George W. Bush delivers his eighth State of the Union address on January 28, 2008.

== Topics ==
The White House indicated beforehand that President Bush's speech would mention the following policies:

- Economy: Keeping the economy healthy
- Budget: Staying on track to a balanced budget by 2012
- Housing: Modernize the Federal Housing Administration to avoid foreclosures
- National Security: Giving our national security professionals tools they need to protect America
- Iraq War: Continued progress in Iraq allows "Return on Success"
- Global War on Terror: Keeping America safe by fostering the freedom agenda
- Veterans: Supporting the nation's troops and their families
- No Child Left Behind: Plan to undergo a $300 million expansion opportunity
- Education: Empowering parents with more choices for their children's education
- Free Trade: Opening new markets and expanding opportunities through free trade
- Energy: Increasing the energy security and confronting climate change
- Healthcare: Empowering Americans with affordable options for health care
- Stem cell research: Increasing federal support for ethical stem cell research
- Faith-based initiatives: Helping those in need through the faith-based and community initiatives
- Immigration: Improving border security and immigration
- Compassion: Advancing an agenda of compassion worldwide
- Disease: Protecting others from diseases such as AIDS
- Science: Requesting that Congress double federal spending on basic physical research

— White House Office of Communications, January 2008

== Democratic response ==
In keeping with tradition of Democrats from red states giving the response, Governor of Kansas Kathleen Sebelius delivered the Democratic response from the Governor's Mansion in Topeka. It has been noted that she focused not on the usual Democratic rebuttal, but more so on the need to get past partisan politics to get the important legislation passed in a timely manner. She was picked by Democratic congressional leaders to make the response because of her ability to reach across partisan lines.

Texas state Senator Leticia Van de Putte gave the Democratic response in Spanish.

== Libertarian response ==
Libertarian Party Chair William Redpath issued a written response to the State of the Union on behalf of the national Libertarian Party.

Steve Kubby, a candidate for the Libertarian Party's 2008 presidential nomination, delivered his own "State of the Union address" via Internet video on January 25, 2008, three days before President Bush's speech. Framed as a preemption rather than merely a response, Kubby's speech attempted to predict the themes President Bush would strike and offered Kubby's own proposals in their stead.

== See also ==
- 2008 United States presidential election

Preceded by 2007 State of the Union Address	State of the Union addresses 2008	Succeeded by 2009 joint session speech
