= Tom Foley =

American politician (1929–2013)

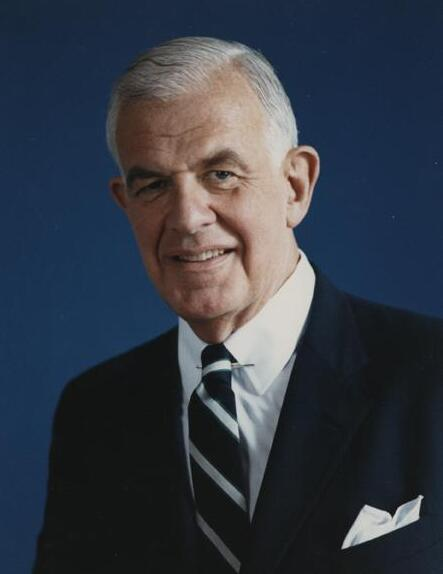

25th United States Ambassador to Japan
- In office November 19, 1997 – April 1, 2001
- President: Bill Clinton; George W. Bush
- Preceded by: Walter Mondale
- Succeeded by: Howard Baker

Chair of the President's Intelligence Advisory Board
- In office January 16, 1996 – November 19, 1997
- President: Bill Clinton
- Preceded by: Warren Rudman (acting)
- Succeeded by: Warren Rudman

49th Speaker of the United States House of Representatives
- In office June 6, 1989 – January 3, 1995
- Preceded by: Jim Wright
- Succeeded by: Newt Gingrich
House positions
Leader of the House Democratic Caucus
In office June 6, 1989 – January 3, 1995
Preceded by	Jim Wright
Succeeded by	Dick Gephardt
House Majority Leader
In office January 3, 1987 – June 6, 1989
Leader	Jim Wright
Preceded by	Jim Wright
Succeeded by	Dick Gephardt
House Majority Whip
In office January 3, 1981 – January 3, 1987
Leader	Tip O'Neill
Preceded by	John Brademas
Succeeded by	Tony Coelho
Chair of the House Democratic Caucus
In office January 3, 1977 – January 3, 1981
Leader	Tip O'Neill
Preceded by	Phillip Burton
Succeeded by	Gillis Long
Chair of the House Agriculture Committee
In office January 3, 1975 – January 3, 1981
Preceded by	William Poage
Succeeded by	Kika de la Garza

Member of the U.S. House of Representatives from Washington's 5th district
- In office January 3, 1965 – January 3, 1995
- Preceded by: Walt Horan
- Succeeded by: George Nethercutt

Personal details
- Born: Thomas Stephen Foley; March 6, 1929 Spokane, Washington, U.S.
- Died: October 18, 2013 (aged 84) Washington, D.C., U.S.
- Party: Democratic
- Spouse: Heather Strachan (m. 1968)
- Education: Gonzaga University; University of Washington (BA, JD)
- Foley's voice Foley on the death of former First Lady Jacqueline Kennedy Onassis. Recorded May 23, 1994

Thomas Stephen Foley (March 6, 1929 – October 18, 2013) was an American lawyer, diplomat, and politician who served as the 49th speaker of the United States House of Representatives from 1989 to 1995. A member of the Democratic Party, Foley represented Washington's 5th congressional district for 30 years (1965–1995). He was the first speaker of the House in over a century since Galusha Grow in 1862 to be defeated in a re-election campaign.

Born in Spokane, Washington, Foley attended Gonzaga University and pursued a legal career, after graduating from the University of Washington School of Law in Seattle. He joined the staff of Senator Henry M. Jackson, after working as a prosecutor and an assistant attorney general. With Jackson's support, Foley won election to the House of Representatives, defeating incumbent Republican Congressman Walt Horan. He served as Majority Whip from 1981 to 1987, and as Majority Leader from 1987 to 1989. After the resignation of Jim Wright, Foley became Speaker of the House.

Foley's district had become increasingly conservative during his tenure, but he won re-election throughout the 1980s and early 1990s. In the 1994 election, Foley faced attorney George Nethercutt. Nethercutt mobilized popular anger over Foley's opposition to term limits, leading to his defeat. After leaving the House, Foley served as the United States Ambassador to Japan from 1997 to 2001 under President Bill Clinton.

== Early life, education, and legal career ==
Born and raised in Spokane, Washington, Foley was the son of Helen Marie (née Higgins) (1902–1990), a school teacher, and Ralph E. Foley (1900–1985), a Superior Court judge for 34 years. He was of Irish Catholic descent on both sides of his family; his grandfather Cornelius Foley was a maintenance foreman for the Great Northern railroad in Spokane.

Foley graduated from the Jesuit-run Gonzaga Preparatory School in Spokane in 1946 and attended Gonzaga University for three years; he completed his bachelor's degree at the University of Washington in Seattle, then attended its School of Law and was awarded a Juris Doctor degree in 1957.

Following law school, Foley entered private practice. In 1958, he began working in the Spokane County prosecutor's office as a deputy prosecuting attorney, and later taught at Gonzaga's School of Law (in Spokane) from 1958 to 1959. He joined the state attorney general's office in 1961 as an assistant attorney general.

In 1961, Foley moved to Washington, D.C., and joined the staff of Senator Henry M. Jackson. He left Jackson's office in 1964 to run for Congress.

== Congressional service ==
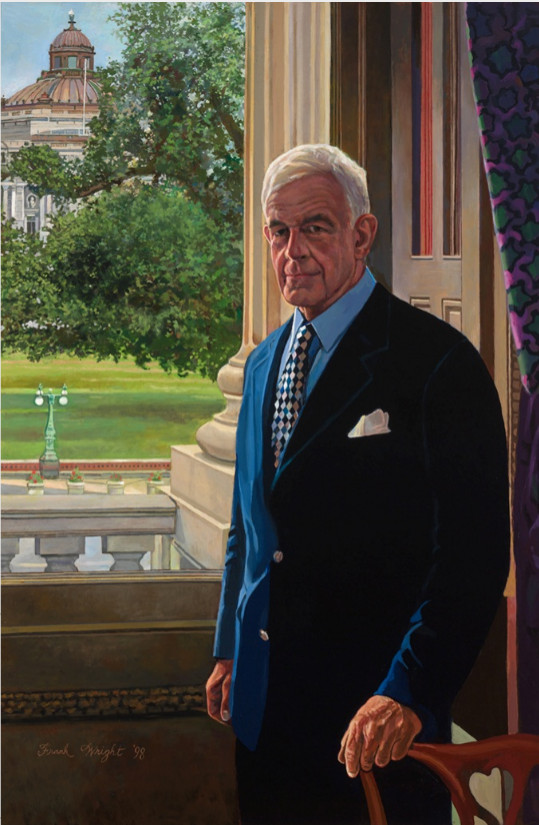
Official congressional portrait of Foley

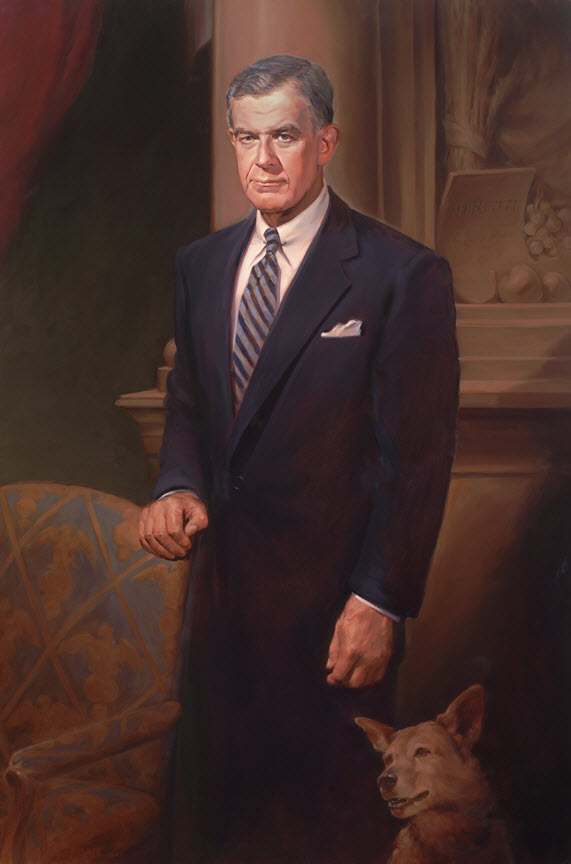
Official portrait as chairman of the Agriculture Committee

In 1964, Foley was unopposed for the Democratic nomination for Washington's 5th congressional seat, which included Spokane. He faced 11-term Republican incumbent Walt Horan in the general election and won by seven points, one of many swept into office in the 1964 Democratic landslide. He was re-elected without significant difficulty until 1978, when in a 3-person race, he won only 48% of the vote. Two years later, he narrowly defeated Republican candidate John Sonneland (52% to 48%). Though the fifth district became increasingly conservative, Foley didn't face serious opposition again until his defeat in 1994. Foley voted in favor of the Voting Rights Act of 1965, the Civil Rights Act of 1968, the bill establishing Martin Luther King Jr. Day as a federal holiday, and the Civil Rights Restoration Act of 1987 (as well as to override President Reagan's veto).

During his first term in the House, Foley was appointed to the Agriculture Committee and the Interior and Insular Affairs Committee. He served on the latter committee through 1975, when he became chairman of the Agriculture Committee. In 1981, when Foley was appointed Majority Whip, he left the Agriculture Committee to serve on the House Administration Committee. Six years later, January 1987, he was elected House Majority Leader.

=== Speaker of the House ===
In June 1989, Jim Wright of Texas resigned as Speaker of the House of Representatives (only the fourth speaker ever to resign) and from Congress amid a House Ethics Committee investigation into his personal business dealings. In the June 6 election to succeed Wright, Foley was the victor, receiving 251 votes; his Republican opponent, Minority Leader Robert H. Michel, received 164 votes.

During the 101st Congress, Foley presided over the House as it passed a landmark update to the 1963 Clean Air Act, measures protecting persons with disabilities, the Americans with Disabilities Act and the Individuals with Disabilities Education Act, as well as the Budget Enforcement Act of 1990. The budget act, a part of the massive Omnibus Budget Reconciliation Act of 1990, established the "pay-as-you-go" process for discretionary spending and taxes, and was signed into law by President George H. W. Bush on November 5, 1990, contrary to his 1988 campaign promise not to raise taxes. This became a significant issue during the 1992 presidential campaign.

In 1993, the 103rd Congress passed an omnibus budget bill through which the government was able to raise additional revenue and balance the federal budget. Signed into law by President Bill Clinton on August 10, 1993, the measure stirred controversy because of the tax increases it imposed. Under Foley's leadership Congress also passed the Family and Medical Leave Act of 1993, the North American Free Trade Agreement Implementation Act, as well as the Brady Handgun Violence Prevention Act plus legislation that laid the groundwork for the "Don't ask, don't tell" military service policy in 1993 which was then instituted by the Clinton Administration in 1994.

=== Term limits ===
During his time in the House, Foley repeatedly opposed efforts to impose term limits on Washington state's elected officials, winning the support of the state's voters to reject term limits in a 1991 referendum; however, in 1992, a term limit ballot initiative was approved by the state's voters.

Foley brought suit, challenging the constitutionality of a state law setting eligibility requirements on federal offices. Foley won his suit, with a United States District Court declaring that states did not have the authority under the United States Constitution to limit the terms of federal officeholders.

However, in Foley's bid for a 16th term in the House, his Republican opponent, George Nethercutt, used the issue against him, citing the caption of the federal case brought by Foley, "Foley against the People of the State of Washington". Nethercutt vowed that if elected, he would not serve more than three terms in the House, though he ultimately served for five. Foley lost in a narrow race. While Foley had usually relied on large margins in Spokane to carry him to victory, in 1994 he won Spokane by only 9,000 votes, while Nethercutt did well enough in the rest of the district to win overall by just under 4,000 votes.

Foley became the first incumbent Speaker of the House to lose his bid for re-election since Galusha A. Grow in 1862. He is sometimes viewed as a political casualty of the term limits controversy of the early 1990s. President Clinton attributed Foley's defeat to his support for the Federal Assault Weapons Ban of 1994. Foley lost his seat in the Republican Revolution.

== Later career ==
From 1995 to 1998, Foley was head of the Federal City Council, a group of business, civic, education, and other leaders interested in economic development in Washington, D.C.

In 1997, Foley was appointed as the 25th U.S. Ambassador to Japan by President Bill Clinton, and was part of the US government response to the deaths of Japanese schoolchildren caused by a US submarine. He served as ambassador until 2001.

Foley was a Washington delegate to the 2004 and 2012 Democratic National Conventions. On July 9, 2003, Governor Gary Locke awarded the Washington Medal of Merit, the state's highest honor, to Foley. He was North American Chairman of the Trilateral Commission.

== Death ==
Foley died at his home in Washington, D.C. on October 18, 2013, following months of hospice care after suffering a series of strokes and a bout with pneumonia. He was 84 and was survived by his wife, Heather. Services were held at St. Aloysius Church at Gonzaga University, as well as in Washington, D.C. Speaker John Boehner, and Nancy Pelosi, who had also served as Speaker, issued statements honoring Foley. In a White House statement, President Barack Obama called Foley a "legend of the United States Congress" who "represented the people of Washington's 5th district with skill, dedication, and a deep commitment to improving the lives of those he was elected to serve.", going on to praise Foley for his bipartisanship and subsequent ambassadorial service under former president Clinton. Vice President Joe Biden also released an official statement, saying "Tom was a good friend and a dedicated public servant.", citing his work in Congress with Foley in the 1980s on budgetary issues. Washington governor Jay Inslee also released a statement, acknowledging Foley's efforts to reach consensus and emphasize mutual common ground, and his work in the legal system and in Congress. Former president George H. W. Bush stated that Foley "represented the very best in public service--and our political system" and "never got personal or burned bridges."

== Honors ==
- Honorary Knight Commander of the Order of the British Empire (UK).
- Order of Merit (Germany).
- Légion d'honneur (France).
- Order of the Rising Sun with Paulownia Flowers, Grand Cordon (Japan), 1995.
- Thomas S. Foley Institute for Public Policy and Public Service at Washington State University. Established in 1995.
- Thomas S. Foley Memorial Highway (U.S. Route 395), dedicated in 2018.

== Electoral history ==
=== Congressional elections ===
- November 3, 1964:

Washington's 5th congressional district election, 1964
Party	Candidate	Votes	%
Democratic	Tom Foley	84,830	53.45
Republican	Walt Horan (incumbent)	73,884	46.55

- November 8, 1966:

Washington's 5th congressional district election, 1966
Party	Candidate	Votes	%
Democratic	Tom Foley (incumbent)	74,571	56.54
Republican	Dorothy R. Powers	57,310	43.46

- November 5, 1968:

Washington's 5th congressional district election, 1968
Party	Candidate	Votes	%
Democratic	Tom Foley (incumbent)	88,446	56.79
Republican	Richard Bond	67,304	43.21

- November 3, 1970:

Washington's 5th congressional district election, 1970
Party	Candidate	Votes	%
Democratic	Tom Foley (incumbent)	88,189	67.03
Republican	George Gamble	43,376	32.97

- November 7, 1972:

Washington's 5th congressional district election, 1972
Party	Candidate	Votes	%
Democratic	Tom Foley (incumbent)	150,580	81.25
Republican	Clarice Privette	34,742	18.75

- November 5, 1974:

Washington's 5th congressional district election, 1974
Party	Candidate	Votes	%
Democratic	Tom Foley (incumbent)	87,959	64.35
Republican	Gary Gage	48,739	35.66

- November 2, 1976:

Washington's 5th congressional district election, 1976
Party	Candidate	Votes	%
Democratic	Tom Foley (incumbent)	120,415	58.01
Republican	Duane Alton	84,262	40.59
Libertarian	D. E. Bear Sandahl	1,959	0.94
U.S. Labor	Ira Liebowitz	935	0.45

- November 7, 1978:

Washington's 5th congressional district election, 1978
Party	Candidate	Votes	%
Democratic	Tom Foley (incumbent)	77,201	48.00
Republican	Duane Alton	68,761	42.75
Independent	Mel Tonasket	14,887	9.26

- November 4, 1980:

Washington's 5th congressional district election, 1980
Party	Candidate	Votes	%
Democratic	Tom Foley (incumbent)	120,530	51.90
Republican	John Sonneland	111,705	48.10

- November 2, 1982:

Washington's 5th congressional district election, 1982
Party	Candidate	Votes	%
Democratic	Tom Foley (incumbent)	109,549	64.30
Republican	John Sonneland	60,816	35.70

- November 6, 1984:

Washington's 5th congressional district election, 1984
Party	Candidate	Votes	%
Democratic	Tom Foley (incumbent)	154,988	69.68
Republican	Jack Hebner	67,438	30.32

- November 4, 1986:

Washington's 5th congressional district election, 1986
Party	Candidate	Votes	%
Democratic	Tom Foley (incumbent)	121,732	74.72
Republican	Floyd Wakefield	41,179	25.28

- November 8, 1988:

Washington's 5th congressional district election, 1988
Party	Candidate	Votes	%
Democratic	Tom Foley (incumbent)	160,654	73.39
Republican	Marlyn Derby	49,657	23.61

- November 6, 1990:

Washington's 5th congressional district election, 1990
Party	Candidate	Votes	%
Democratic	Tom Foley (incumbent)	110,234	68.81
Republican	Marlyn Derby	49,965	31.19

- November 3, 1992:

Washington's 5th congressional district election, 1992
Party	Candidate	Votes	%
Democratic	Tom Foley (incumbent)	135,965	55.18
Republican	John Sonneland	110,443	44.82

- November 8, 1994:

Washington's 5th congressional district election, 1994
Party	Candidate	Votes	%
Republican	George Nethercutt	110,057	50.92
Democratic	Tom Foley (incumbent)	106,074	49.08

=== Speaker elections ===
- June 6, 1989:

1989 intra-term Speaker of the House election – 101st Congress
Party	Candidate	Votes	Percent
Democratic	Tom Foley (Washington)	251	60.19%
Republican	Robert H. Michel (Illinois)	164	39.33%
Answered "present"		2	0.48%
Total votes:		417	100%

- January 3, 1991:

1991 Speaker of the House election – 102nd Congress
Party	Candidate	Votes	Percent
Democratic	Tom Foley (Washington)	262	61.07%
Republican	Robert H. Michel (Illinois)	165	38.47%
Answered "present"		2	0.46%
Total votes:		429	100%

- January 5, 1993:

1993 Speaker of the House election – 103rd Congress
Party	Candidate	Votes	Percent
Democratic	Tom Foley (Washington)	255	59.16%
Republican	Robert H. Michel (Illinois)	174	40.38%
Answered "present"		2	0.46%
Total votes:		431	100%

U.S. House of Representatives
Preceded by Walt Horan	Member of the U.S. House of Representatives from Washington's 5th congressional district 1965–1995	Succeeded by George Nethercutt
Preceded by William Poage	Chair of the House Agriculture Committee; 1975–1981	Succeeded by Kika de la Garza
Preceded by John Brademas	House Majority Whip; 1981–1987	Succeeded by Tony Coelho
Preceded by Jim Wright	House Majority Leader; 1987–1989	Succeeded by Dick Gephardt
Party political offices
Preceded by Phillip Burton	Chair of the House Democratic Caucus; 1977–1981	Succeeded by Gillis Long
Preceded by Jim Wright	House Democratic Leader; 1989–1995	Succeeded by Dick Gephardt
Preceded by Lloyd Bentsen; Jim Wright	Response to the State of the Union address 1990	Succeeded by George Mitchell
Preceded by George Mitchell	Response to the State of the Union address 1992	Succeeded by Bob Michel
Political offices
Preceded by Jim Wright	Speaker of the U.S. House of Representatives; 1989–1995	Succeeded by Newt Gingrich
Government offices
Preceded by Warren Rudman; Acting	Chair of the President's Intelligence Advisory Board; 1996–1997	Succeeded by Warren Rudman
Diplomatic posts
Preceded by Walter Mondale	United States Ambassador to Japan; 1997–2001	Succeeded by Howard Baker
