= Bronze Medallion (New York City award) =

Highest civilian award given by New York City

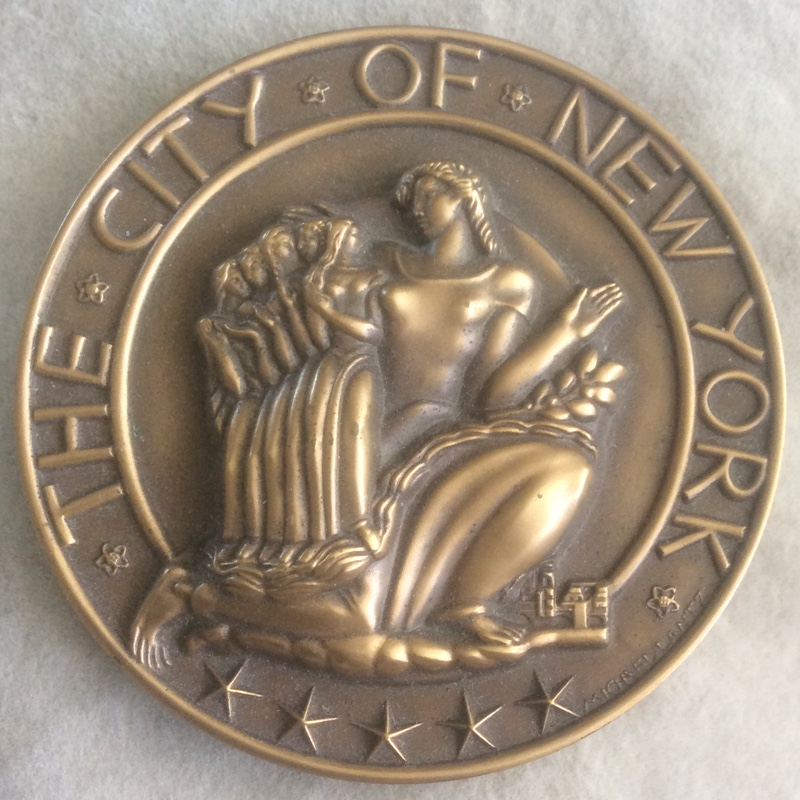
Obverse

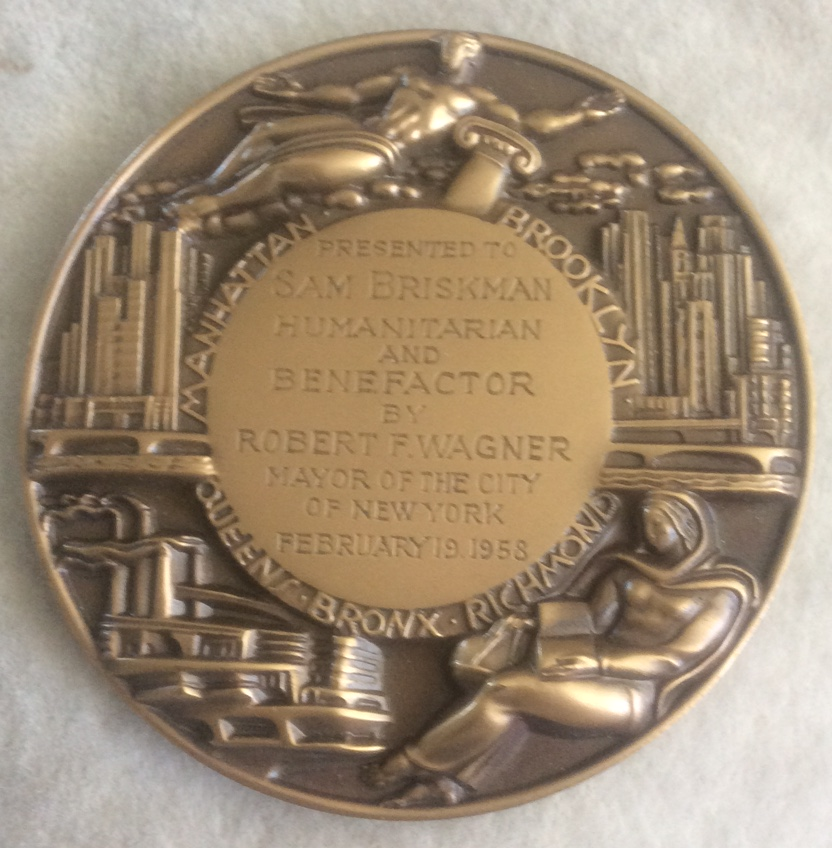
Reverse

The Bronze Medallion is the highest award conferred upon civilians by New York City.

The medal is presented by the Mayor to those individuals who have demonstrated, "exceptional citizenship and outstanding achievement". The recipients come from a wide range of backgrounds, including ordinary citizens, foreign dignitaries, athletes, and film stars.

== Description ==
The medallion is two and three quarter inches in diameter and was designed by Michael Lantz, best known for his 1938 sculpture Man Controlling Trade at the Federal Trade Commission Building in Washington, DC.

== Recipients ==
- Muhammad Ali, heavyweight boxing champion
- David A. Asch (1968)
- Wesley Autrey, on January 5, 2007, for heroism for saving the life of a fellow commuter by throwing himself over his body in the face of an oncoming train
- Tony Bennett, singer (1969)
- Sam Briskman, inventor of pinking shears. On reverse: Presented to Sam Briskman, humanitarian and benefactor, by Robert F. Wagner, Mayor of the City of New York, February 19, 1958.
- Samuel Brooks, NYC Zoning board, Distinguished Service Given to him from Mayor Lindsey
- Roy Campanella, baseball player (1969)
- The Dessoff Choirs, in 1975, for contributing to the musical life and culture of New York City for fifty years
- Althea Gibson, after her first Wimbledon win (1957)
- 1974 presentation to four Brooklyn teenagers, for heroism in 1973, when they pulled an unconscious man out of the path of an oncoming BMT train.
  - Joseph G. Greer
  - Richard Groller
  - Daniel Gross
  - John P. Walsh
- Lionel Hampton, in 1978, jazz vibraphonist and bandleader
- James R Brigham Jr., on July 1, 1981, for heroic and dedicated service to the City of New York as Budget Director. Awarded by Edward I. Koch, Mayor.
- Gil Hodges, baseball player (1969)
- Philip Johnson, architect
- William Kavanagh, supporting and enhancing the New York education system
- Martin H. Kennelly, in 1950, mayor of Chicago, Illinois
- Alan King, comedian (1969)
- Martin Luther King Jr., civil rights activist
- Hoyt W Lark, in 1950, Mayor of Cranston Rhode Island
- General Douglas MacArthur, United States Army General
- Carlo MacDonald, lifetime achievement
- Willie Mays, baseball player
- Joseph Mruk, Buffalo, NY. Presented by Mayor William O'Dwyer 1950.
- Joe Namath, football quarterback (1969)
- Lewis Rudin, for lifetime contributions as a property developer
- 2019 presentation to 18 people and organizations, for "tireless advocacy, inspiration, and leadership (helping to) pass the permanent authorization of the September 11th Victim Compensation Fund Act"
  - Luis Alvarez (posthumous): Former New York City Police Detective and 9/11 first-responder
  - Chief Paul Brown: New York City Department of Sanitation Head of Personnel Management and 9/11 first-responder
  - Ben Chevat: Executive Director of 9/11 Health Watch
  - John Feal: Founder of the FealGood Foundation and advocate for 9/11 first-responders
  - Kimberly Flynn: Director of 9/11 Environmental Action and 9/11 children's advocate
  - Lila Nordstrom: 9/11 children's advocate and founder of StuyHealth
  - Richard Palmer: Former New York City Department of Correction Warden and 9/11 first-responder
  - Ray Pfiefer (posthumous): Former New York City Firefighter and 9/11 first-responder
  - Deborah Reeve (posthumous): Former New York City Fire Department Emergency Medical Technician and 9/11 first-responder
  - Jon Stewart: Advocate for 9/11 first-responders
  - James Zadroga (posthumous): Former New York City Police Officer and 9/11 first-responder
  - Port Authority of New York and New Jersey: accepting by two representatives on behalf of the Port Authority Police Department and the Port Authority civilian employees
  - Municipal Labor Committee: Association of Labor Unions representing public sector employees in New York City.
  - U.S. Representative Carolyn B. Maloney: U.S. Representative for New York's 12th Congressional District
  - U.S. Representative Peter King: U.S. Representative for New York's 2nd Congressional District
  - U.S. Representative Jerrold Nadler: U.S. Representative for New York's 10th Congressional District
  - U.S. Senator for New York Chuck Schumer
  - U.S. Senator for New York Kirsten Gillibrand
- Robert Tisch, co-owner of the New York Giants, for renovating 43 New York City school fields (posthumous)
- Felix Vasquez, for heroism for saving the life of a one-month-old baby during a fire in the Bronx - 16 December 2006
- Gordon B. Washburn, renowned museum director, received medal on April 24, 1974, from Mayor Abraham D. Beame. Given upon Mr. Washburn's retirement from the Asia House Gallery. Inscribed ars longa vita brevis.
- Fred Wilpon, for a lifetime of service to the City
