= 2006 State of the Union Address =

Speech by US President George W. Bush

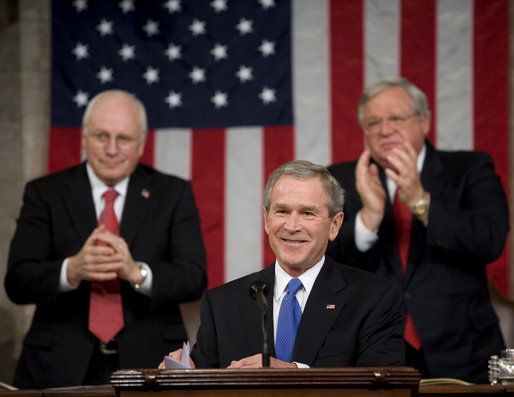
- President George W. Bush during the speech, with Vice President Dick Cheney and House Speaker Dennis Hastert behind him
- Date: January 31, 2006
- Time: 9:00 p.m. EST
- Duration: 51 minutes
- Venue: House Chamber, United States Capitol
- Location: Washington, D.C.; 38°53′19.8″N 77°00′32.8″W
- Type: State of the Union Address
- Participants: George W. Bush; Dick Cheney; Dennis Hastert
- Previous: 2005 State of the Union Address
- Next: 2007 State of the Union Address

The 2006 State of the Union Address was given by the 43rd president of the United States, George W. Bush, on January 31, 2006, at 9:00 p.m. EST, in the chamber of the United States House of Representatives to the 109th United States Congress. It was Bush's fifth State of the Union Address and his sixth speech to a joint session of the United States Congress. Presiding over this joint session was the House speaker, Dennis Hastert, accompanied by Dick Cheney, the vice president, in his capacity as the president of the Senate.

The address outlined the President's legislative proposals for the upcoming year and referenced the budget deficit, health care reform, the war on terror, the Occupation of Iraq, Iran's nuclear program, the rising price of gasoline and the transfer to independent sources of alternative energy, illegal immigration, Hurricane Katrina and the federal response to natural disasters, Avian influenza (H5N1) outbreak, the Abramoff scandal and corruption within the government, the NSA spying controversy, the successful nomination of Supreme Court Justice Samuel Alito, and the Administration's proposed ban on same-sex marriage.

Newly elected Governor of Virginia Tim Kaine gave the Democratic response in English and Mayor of Los Angeles Antonio Villaraigosa did so in Spanish.

== Introduction ==
President Bush began his State of the Union Address for the year by reflecting on the memory of Coretta Scott King, who died earlier that day, and Martin Luther King Jr., "the husband who was taken so long ago". Bush then paralleled "moments of national mourning," an indirect reference to the September 11, 2001 attacks with "national achievement." When discussing the American political system, Bush used anaphora, repeating "two" at the beginning of each clause, "two parties, two chambers, and two elected branches."

Bush shifted his tense from the past to the future while emphasizing the need for civility and bipartisanship among legislators during debate. Echoing his 2005 State of the Union address, he stated "Tonight the state of our Union is strong – and together we will make it stronger."

== Terrorism and isolationism ==
He again used anaphora by repeating "We will choose," paralleling "pursuing the enemies of freedom," applicable to both the Axis of Evil and terrorists in general, with "Retreating "from our duties in the hope of an easier life," a direct attack on Criticism of the Iraq War, which particularly calls for withdrawal. He paralleled choosing "to build our prosperity by leading the world economy" with the alternative "shut[ting] ourselves off from trade and opportunity," a warning against protectionism and isolationism.

The President cited a foiled terror plot in Los Angeles, where terrorists supposedly planned to hijack a plane and fly it into the Liberty Tower.

== Democracy versus tyranny ==
Bush stated that America's involvement in Afghanistan is a necessity, part of an overall historical goal of trying to end tyranny worldwide, because "problems originating in a failed and oppressive state seven thousand miles away" orchestrated the September 11th attacks and continue to "shelter terrorists, feed resentment and radicalism, and seek weapons of mass destruction" whereas Democracies give hope and "respect the rights of their citizens and their neighbors."

The president pointed out that there are 98 more Democratic countries in 2006 than there were in 1945, in addition to Women's suffrage in Afghanistan, the Purple Revolution in Iraq, and political discourse in Lebanon and Egypt, as evidence that Democracy, freedom, and self-governance have grown throughout the world. Although many social and political analysts would agree that more people live in free and fair societies than at the end of World War II, all of the examples Bush provided lay in the Middle East.

He went on to say that the "demands of justice, and the peace of this world, require... freedom" for the citizens of nations in the Axis of Evil; Syria, Burma, Zimbabwe, North Korea, and Iran.

== Radical Islam ==
Shifting away from the comparison of democracy and dictatorship during the Cold War and post-9/11 America, Bush outlined the major opposition to freedom as radical Islam, which he defines as "the perversion by a few of a noble faith into an ideology of terror and death." See also: Religion of Peace

He stressed that "bin Laden [is] serious about mass murder" and wants to "impose... totalitarian control throughout the Middle East, and arm [al Qaeda] with weapons of mass murder. Their aim is to seize power in Iraq, and use it as a safe haven... When they murder children at a school in Beslan, or blow up commuters in London, or behead a bound captive, the terrorists hope these horrors will break our will."

He indirectly referenced the Beatitudes by saying the terrorists hope that breaking the will of the U.S. will allow "the violent to inherit the Earth."

== Retreat from evil ==
In a verbal attack on "isolationist" and "appeasing" sentiments, Bush condemned "the false comfort of isolationism" for sending the "signal to all that we no longer believe in our own ideals, or even in our own courage."

== Energy ==
Bush stated that America is addicted to oil often originating from unstable parts of the world. He announced increased funding in clean-energy research: renewable energy, for instance biofuels and nuclear energy. He also stated the goal of 75% oil import replacement by 2025 based on new technologies.

== Statistics ==
- The President spoke for 51 minutes, and was interrupted for applause 61 times, the same as the previous year's address.
- Nielsen Media Research reported more than 41 million viewers watched the speech, three million more than the previous year.
- Per tradition, Veterans Affairs Secretary Jim Nicholson did not attend the address, should a catastrophic event wipe out the administration, and to keep a presidential line of succession.

== See also ==
- Timeline of United States diplomatic history
- Fourth Annual State of Indian Nations Address
- 2006 United States House of Representatives elections

Preceded by 2005 State of the Union Address	State of the Union addresses 2006	Succeeded by 2007 State of the Union Address
