= 2003 State of the Union Address =

Speech by US President George W. Bush

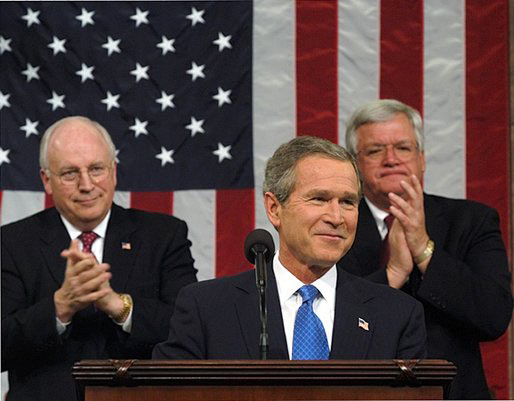
- President George W. Bush during the speech, with Vice President Dick Cheney and House Speaker Dennis Hastert behind him
- Date: January 28, 2003
- Time: 9:00 p.m. EST
- Duration: 59 minutes
- Venue: House Chamber, United States Capitol
- Location: Washington, D.C.; 38°53′19.8″N 77°00′32.8″W
- Type: State of the Union Address
- Participants: George W. Bush; Dick Cheney; Dennis Hastert
- Previous: 2002 State of the Union Address
- Next: 2004 State of the Union Address

The 2003 State of the Union Address was given by the 43rd president of the United States, George W. Bush, on January 28, 2003, at 9:00 p.m. EST, in the chamber of the United States House of Representatives to the 108th United States Congress. It was Bush's second State of the Union Address and his third speech to a joint session of the United States Congress. Presiding over this joint session was the House speaker, Dennis Hastert, accompanied by Dick Cheney, the vice president, in his capacity as the president of the Senate.

It outlined justifications for the 2003 invasion of Iraq. It began his discussion of the "war on terror" by asserting, as he had after September 11, 2001 and in his previous State of the Union, that "the gravest danger facing America and the world, is outlaw regimes that seek and possess nuclear, chemical and biological weapons." In 2002, Bush had laid out the "Axis of Evil", touching on Iran and North Korea before elaborating on Iraq. The 2003 speech would focus entirely on Iraq, in parallel with an ongoing campaign in the United Nations for support on an Iraq intervention.

Bush said that Saddam Hussein, "a brutal dictator, with a history of reckless aggression, with ties to terrorism, with great potential wealth, will not be permitted to dominate a vital region and threaten the United States." In this context, Bush also said, "The British government has learned that Saddam Hussein recently sought significant quantities of uranium from Africa", a line which became known as the "sixteen words", and would be a source of contention in the later Plame affair. The domestic brutality of Hussein and the benefits of liberty and freedom for the Iraqi people were briefly noted near the end of the speech. He began with, "In all these days of promise and days of reckoning, we can be confident. In a whirlwind of change and hope and peril, our faith is sure, our resolve is firm, and our union is strong." In the middle of the speech, he said, "In Afghanistan, we helped liberate an oppressed people. And we will continue helping them secure their country, rebuild their society, and educate all their children — boys and girls." He ended with, "Americans are a free people, who know that freedom is the right of every person and the future of every nation. The liberty we prize is not America's gift to the world, it is God's gift to humanity." He spoke to the 108th United States Congress.

Just before the President addressed Iraq in the speech, he spent five paragraphs addressing his initiative to fight AIDS in Africa.

The Democratic response was given by then Washington Governor Gary Locke, who was appointed to be United States Ambassador to China in 2011.

== See also ==
- "16 words" – a controversial phrase in George W. Bush's 2003 State of the Union Address

Preceded by 2002 State of the Union Address	State of the Union addresses 2003	Succeeded by 2004 State of the Union Address
