= 2004 State of the Union Address =

Speech by US President George W. Bush

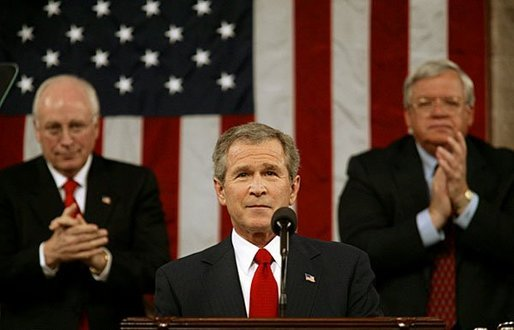
- President George W. Bush during the speech, with Vice President Dick Cheney and House Speaker Dennis Hastert behind him
- Date: January 20, 2004
- Time: 9:00 p.m. EST
- Duration: 53 minutes
- Venue: House Chamber, United States Capitol
- Location: Washington, D.C.; 38°53′19.8″N 77°00′32.8″W
- Type: State of the Union Address
- Participants: George W. Bush; Dick Cheney; Dennis Hastert
- Previous: 2003 State of the Union Address
- Next: 2005 State of the Union Address

The 2004 State of the Union Address was given by the 43rd president of the United States, George W. Bush, on January 20, 2004, at 9:00 p.m. EST, in the chamber of the United States House of Representatives to the 108th United States Congress. It was Bush's third State of the Union Address and his fourth speech to a joint session of the United States Congress. Presiding over this joint session was the House speaker, Dennis Hastert, accompanied by Dick Cheney, the vice president, in his capacity as the president of the Senate.

The speech was given 28 months after the September 11 attacks on the World Trade Center.

== Topics ==
=== War on terror ===
President Bush begins by saying that the greatest responsibility of the government is to protect all Americans from terroristic threats. He also highlighted that several years had passed since the terrorist attacks on September the 11th. While several years had passed "without an attack on American soil", it did not mean that all of the danger was in the past. After September 11, attacks continued around the world in Bali, Jerusalem, Baghdad, and other major regions of the world. The President also focuses on how enemies of the United States are constantly plotting attacks of some form or another. The Patriot Act was mentioned as a point of emphasis for giving the United States Department of Homeland Security all of the necessary resources to find criminals and locate possible attack scenarios. One of the recurring themes of the speech was that "America is on the offensive" and is constantly on the hunt for members of Al-Qaeda and the Taliban. President Bush then proceeded to discuss how American allies helped to convince several countries to eliminate weapons of mass destruction.

=== Troops in the Middle East ===
President Bush talks about the evolution of the Iraqi people since the American intervention and overthrow of Iraqi leader Saddam Hussein. He talked about how the Iraqis have started down the road of complete independence. They slowly accepted responsibility for organizing their own security once the Americans decide to withdraw, whenever that may be. He also talks about how democracy is slowly taking shape in Iraq thanks to Americans always having a desire to do what is considered "right". At one point during the speech, the President gave thanks to the troops and families of troops stationed all across the world and assured that they would have every resource necessary to succeed overseas. He also reaffirmed that as long as the Middle East continued to be a place where American resentment was present, America would have a presence there, working to transform the area into one of peace towards the United States. He referred to preliminary findings of the Iraq Survey Group, headed at that point in time by David Kay, that "weapons of mass destruction-related program activities" had been found in Iraq.

=== Economy ===
The primary emphasis of the President's portion of his speech on the economy was geared towards the accomplishments of the American people. He thanks the American people for giving tax relief to help stimulate the economy. He also continued to use the personal pronoun "you" when talking about American successes in areas like cutting taxes for small businesses, phasing out the estate tax, and lowering taxes for all citizens who pay income taxes. He ends the economic talk by stating that the economy is always changing, as is the technology, and how new jobs and skills are needed constantly.

=== Education ===
President Bush's main focus of the talks on education were the effects of the No Child Left Behind Act. He again used the pronoun "you" when talking about the recent successes in education. The President also stated that since 2001, a 36 percent increase in funding for schools took place, as well as an elevation in standards and communication between schools and parents. He followed by saying that the days of shuffling kids along without knowing if they understood what was necessary were over as a result of the No Child Left Behind Act. President Bush also announced additional funding to high schools with a focus on technical programs called Jobs for the 21st Century.

=== Taxes ===
The President's discussion of taxes was centered on the fact that the tax reforms were about to expire, and unless Congress were to do something about it, taxes would jump to a higher level.

=== Energy ===
The President's discussion of energy was primarily asking Congress to pass new legislature that would modernize electricity and increase conservation.

=== Immigration ===
The President proposed a new immigration reform that consisted of giving American citizens priority in being hired for jobs. If no willing Americans could be found for the job, then they would go to foreign workers to help create an even workforce. He also states his opposition for amnesty because it would encourage more people to illegally immigrate to America and break laws.

=== Healthcare ===
President Bush talked about the rapid evolution of medical technology and how costs for healthcare with these new technologies was on the rise. He campaigned for Congress to again work together to help keep the costs of health insurance as low as possible. He stated that his primary goal for healthcare is to give all Americans the opportunity to have affordable private healthcare that tailors to their specific needs. He also focuses on the benefits of computerizing medical records and the adverse effects of a government run healthcare system.

=== "Right choices" ===
President Bush focused on the youth of the nation and them making "right choices" in life. He talked about the negative impact of children gambling away their lives with drugs and how he wanted Congress to send extra funding to schools to use for drug testing to save lives. He also talked about how large a part of American society sports are, but yet there are a multitude of less than positive influences in professional sports. The President also wanted to increase funding to make sexual contraceptives easier to acquire for younger people. He also refers to the Defense of Marriage Act and how it needs to be adhered to help influence children more positively and for the benefit of every American citizen.

=== Religious institutions ===
The President talked about how religious charities and organizations, no matter what creed, do important charity work in communities across the country. He pointed out the fact that the government denied many of these groups of grants for charity work, but he made available large amounts of money for these groups to continue their charitable work.

== Democratic Party response ==
Democrats opposed President Bush's foreign policies. They believed that America could only go so far on its own and needed to rely on other countries to "meet common dangers". They accused the President of being too radical in going to war with Iraq, as well as dropping the cost of war on the American people by taxing them more than necessary. Democrats also supported removing troops from the Middle East, whereas President Bush wanted to leave them there to have a presence in an area seen as dangerous by the American government. Democrats also wanted to increase the inspection rate of cargo going in and out of airports and harbors across the country to increase civil liberties, something which President Bush opposed. The tax cuts that the President had made were heavily opposed by Democrats, as well. They also said that the President did not hold up his end of the deal in the No Child Left Behind Act.

== See also ==
- 2004 United States presidential election

| Preceded by 2003 State of the Union Address | State of the Union addresses 2004 | Succeeded by 2005 State of the Union Address |
