= 2005 State of the Union Address =

Speech by US President George W. Bush

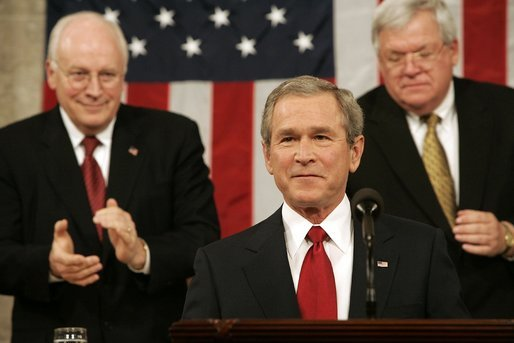
- President George W. Bush during the speech, with Vice President Dick Cheney and House Speaker Dennis Hastert behind him
- Date: February 2, 2005
- Time: 9:00 p.m. EST
- Duration: 53 minutes
- Venue: House Chamber, United States Capitol
- Location: Washington, D.C.; 38°53′19.8″N 77°00′32.8″W
- Type: State of the Union Address
- Participants: George W. Bush; Dick Cheney; Dennis Hastert
- Previous: 2004 State of the Union Address
- Next: 2006 State of the Union Address

The 2005 State of the Union Address was given by the 43rd president of the United States, George W. Bush, on February 2, 2005, at 9:00 p.m. EST, in the chamber of the United States House of Representatives to the 109th United States Congress. It was Bush's fourth State of the Union Address and his fifth speech to a joint session of the United States Congress. Presiding over this joint session was the House speaker, Dennis Hastert, accompanied by Dick Cheney, the vice president, in his capacity as the president of the Senate.

== Introduction ==
2005 State of the Union Address
George W. Bush delivers his fifth State of the Union address on February 2, 2005.

President Bush began his State of the Union address by saying that the United States Government has a "great privilege" of being "placed in office by the votes of the people we serve. And tonight that is a privilege we share with newly-elected leaders of Afghanistan, the Palestinian Territories, Ukraine, and a free and sovereign Iraq," a reference to the first truly democratic, and relatively fair and free, elections that took place in the respective nations.

He reminded Congress of George W. Bush's second inaugural address, "Two weeks ago, I stood on the steps of this Capitol and renewed the commitment of our nation to the guiding ideal of liberty for all." He then outlined the next part of his speech, beginning with domestic issues, and moving on to United States foreign policy, "This evening I will set forth policies to advance that ideal at home and around the world."

== Economy ==
The president began his domestic analysis by drawing attention to the growing United States economy, "Our generation has been blessed," and first and second generation parents, "we watch our children moving into adulthood... let us do what Americans have always done, and build a better world for our children and our grandchildren."

He noted that despite the recent recession, the economy is the fastest growing of any major industrialized nation, homeownership is at an all-time high, and 2.3 million (this statistic was highly disputed in the coming days) new jobs had been created. He attributed the economic turn around to his tax cuts, specifically lower income taxes, free trade initiatives, prosecution of corporate criminals.

== Statistics ==
Thirty-eight million viewers watched the address, a lower figure than any of Bush's previous State of the Union addresses, and indeed lower than any State of the Union addresses in the preceding twelve years.

Preceded by 2004 State of the Union Address	State of the Union addresses 2005	Succeeded by 2006 State of the Union Address
