= Democratic response to the 2006 State of the Union address =

Speech by Virginia Governor Tim Kaine

The response to the 2006 State of the Union Address was delivered by Virginia Governor Tim Kaine on January 31, 2006, after United States President George W. Bush delivered his 2006 State of the Union address. The theme of Kaine's speech, "A Better Way", advocates the Democratic Party's policies and states' rights. Kaine delivered the speech from Virginia's historic Executive Mansion in Richmond and the speech was televised nationwide.

== Introduction ==
Kaine begins his speech by recalling his work as a Catholic missionary in Honduras where he learned the value of measuring one's "life by the difference [one] can make in someone else's life." Kaine mourns the loss of Coretta Scott King, as Bush did in the introduction of his speech, who "embodied that value."

Kaine's diction emphasizes the role of elected officials as public servants, portraying the duties of office as a "higher calling" and referring to the federal government's duty to "serve the American people" as a frustrated "mission" due to the Bush administration's "poor choices and bad management."

== Criticism of government policies ==
Kaine attacks the government's most controversial actions and positions; the Federal response to Hurricane Katrina, "Families in the Gulf Coast see [the government's mistakes] as they wait to rebuild their lives", the United States economy, "Americans who lose their jobs see [the government's mistakes] as they look to rebuild their careers", the Iraq War, "and our soldiers in Iraq see that as they try to rebuild a nation".

=== Bipartisan cooperation ===
Both Bush and Kaine emphasize the need for bipartisan cooperation.

Kaine, "As Americans, we do great things when we work together. Some of our leaders in Washington seem to have forgotten that."

Bush, "... even tough debates can be conducted in a civil tone... our differences cannot be allowed to harden into anger... we must act in a spirit of good will and respect for one another."

== Kaine's theme: "A better way" ==
Kaine offers "good news", stating that "Virginia and other states" were succeeding "by focusing on service, competent management and results", the theme of his speech. He also points out that, under previous Governor Mark Warner, Virginia was voted "Best Managed State", in order to draw a stark contrast with the financial state of the nation, saying a citizen has "a right to expect that your government can deliver results".

He then poses a series of hypothetical situations, linked through the anaphoric repetition of the word "When", invoking the September 11, 2001 attacks, Hurricane Katrina and attacking the quality of Education in the United States. He particularly criticizes the government's fiscal policy, insisting that citizens "have a right to expect [the] government to be fiscally responsible, pay the bills and live within its means", a criticism of governmental corruption and the trillion dollar "staggering national debt". Kaine accuses Bush mismanagement, citing his tax cuts, and paralleling the "huge surpluses" of the Clinton administration with the "massive deficits" of the Bush administration.

Kaine asks rhetorically, "Why should we allow this administration to pass down the bill for its reckless spending to our children and grandchildren?" and repeats his theme, "There's a better way."

== Success in Virginia ==
Kaine switches his focus from an international level to a state level, discussing the fiscally successful budget reached "Two years ago in Virginia" by Republican legislators and former Democratic Virginia governor Mark Warner. Kaine's first points attack inadequate "service... management and results." The second part of the speech is outlined by Kaine's success on a state level and Bush's mistakes on a national level, "By focusing on results we were able to... protect the essential services that families rely on: education, health care, law enforcement."

=== Education ===
Kaine denounces the No Child Left Behind Act for "wreaking havoc on local school districts" and blames Bush for allegedly underfunding the act while "refusing to let states try innovative alternatives" and "cutting billions of dollars from the student loan programs."

He repeats his theme a third time and recalls how "governors from across the country worked together in a bipartisan fashion to reform the senior year of high school", a sentence that repeats the bipartisanship, working, and reform emphasized in his comment on the Virginia budget, "Democrats and Republicans worked together to reform our budget".

He notes how states "are working to make... pre-kindergarten accessible to every family."

Announcing a Democrat plan "to educate 100,000 new engineers, scientists and mathematicians in the next four years", Kaine proposes an alternative policy to the Bush administration. However, his statement remains vague as he never actually states the Democrat's plan. Instead, he points to "record investments in education... [resulting in] more accredited schools [and] better student test scores", and attributes this to Virginian bipartisan cooperation.

== Political significance ==
The success of Democrats in Virginia, notably Kaine's election as Governor, provided a success story for national Democrats to begin 2006, which was to be a year of a Congressional midterm election. The success of Kaine and Warner in rebuilding the Democratic Party in the Republican-leaning state was rewarded with Kaine's response to President Bush, which highlighted the competence of Virginia's Democratic administration with the perceived incompetence of the Bush Administration in the wake of Hurricane Katrina. The political success and strength of Virginia Democrats would be heightened the following January, when newly elected Virginia Senator Jim Webb would be chosen to deliver the Democratic response to the 2007 State of the Union address. In continuing the tradition of a Democrat from a red state delivering the Democratic response, Kansas Governor Kathleen Sebelius gave the response to the 2008 State of the Union address. Webb's election over incumbent Senator George Allen in the 2006 Virginia Senate election tipped control of the United States Senate to the Democratic Party for the first time in four years and, with the election of a Democratic majority in the US House of Representatives, resulted in the first Democratic-controlled Congress in twelve years.
