= John Wayne Elementary School =

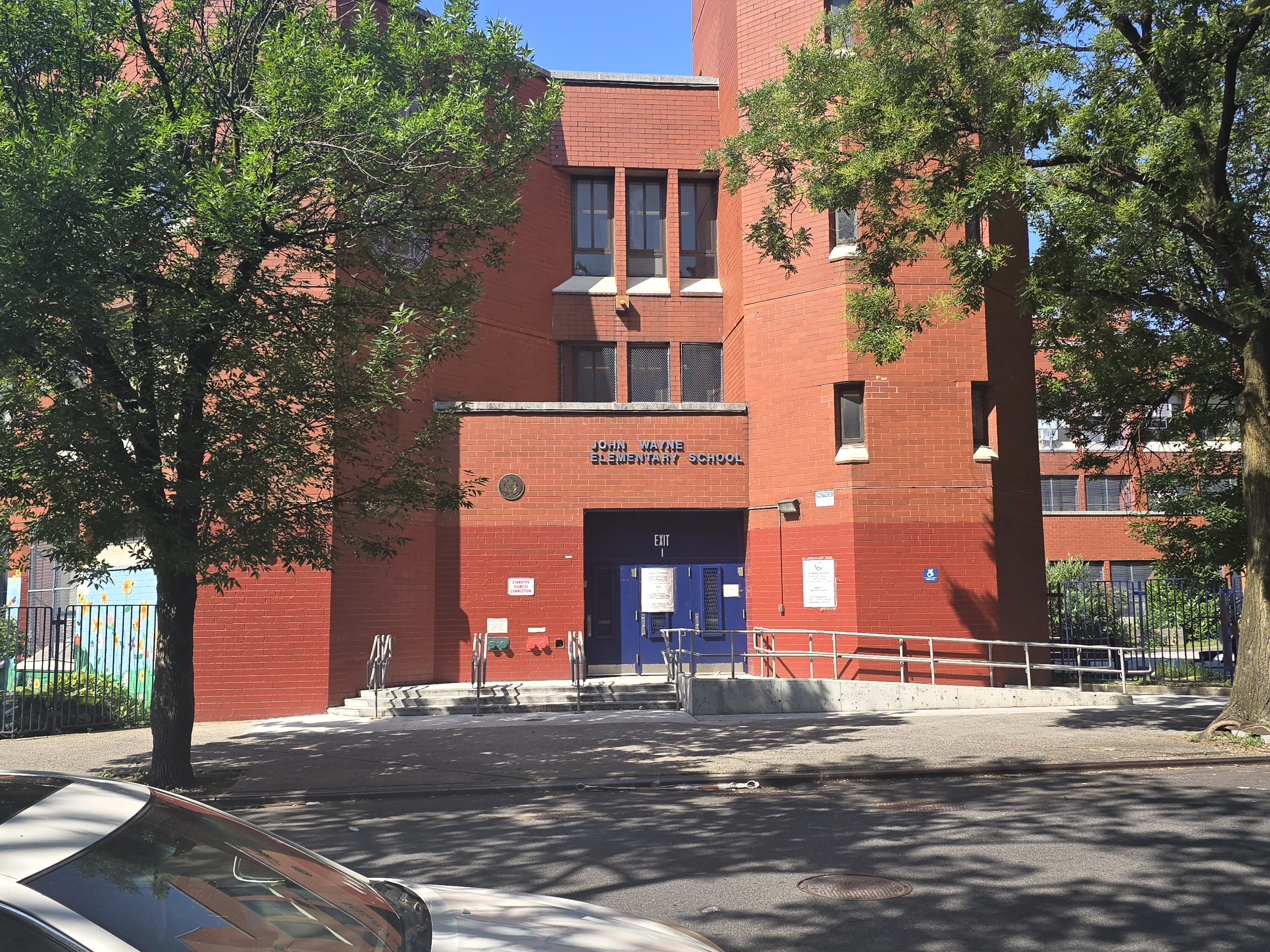

Location
- 710 East 37th Street; Brooklyn, New York City, New York 11206; United States
- Coordinates: 40.7020°N 73.9535°W

Information
- Website: www.ps380brooklyn.com

John Wayne Elementary School (P.S. 380), is an elementary school, located at 370 Marcy Avenue, Williamsburg, Brooklyn.

Dedicated in honor of John Wayne on October 28, 1982, "John Wayne Elementary School Day". John Wayne's seven children attended the dedication. Inside the school is a 38-foot mosaic mural commission by New York artist Knox Martin entitled "John Wayne and the American Frontier".

John Wayne Elementary School was in the news in 2007 when it was reported that "Subway Hero" Wesley Autrey was working at the school.

== See also ==
- List of public elementary schools in New York City
- John Wayne
- Knox Martin

== Books ==
- Michele Cohen, Stan Ries, and Michael Bloomberg "Public Art for Public Schools" (New York: The Monacelli Press, 2009) ISBN 1-58093-215-0
