= 1998 State of the Union Address =

Speech by US President Bill Clinton

- Full video of the speech as published by the White House
- Date: January 27, 1998
- Time: 9:00 p.m. EST
- Duration: 1 hour, 16 minutes
- Venue: House Chamber, United States Capitol
- Location: Washington, D.C.; 38°53′23″N 77°00′32″W
- Type: State of the Union Address
- Participants: Bill Clinton; Al Gore; Newt Gingrich
- Previous: 1997 State of the Union Address
- Next: 1999 State of the Union Address

The 1998 State of the Union Address was given by the 42nd president of the United States, Bill Clinton, on January 27, 1998, at 9:00 p.m. EST, in the chamber of the United States House of Representatives to the 105th United States Congress. It was Clinton's fifth State of the Union Address and his sixth speech to a joint session of the United States Congress. Presiding over this joint session was the House speaker, Newt Gingrich, accompanied by Al Gore, the vice president, in his capacity as the president of the Senate.

President Clinton discussed the federal budget, taxes and focused on the budget deficit, then at $10 billion. The president also discussed education, foreign relations, science funding, development, space travel and the Internet.

In the speech, the president acknowledged the deaths of Representatives Walter Capps and Sonny Bono.

The speech lasted 1:16:43 and consisted of 7,303 words.

The Republican Party response was delivered by Senator Trent Lott of Mississippi.

William Daley, the Secretary of Commerce, served as the designated survivor.

== See also ==
- 1998 United States House of Representatives elections

Preceded by 1997 State of the Union Address	State of the Union addresses 1998	Succeeded by 1999 State of the Union Address
