= State of the Union =

Annual report by the president of the United States

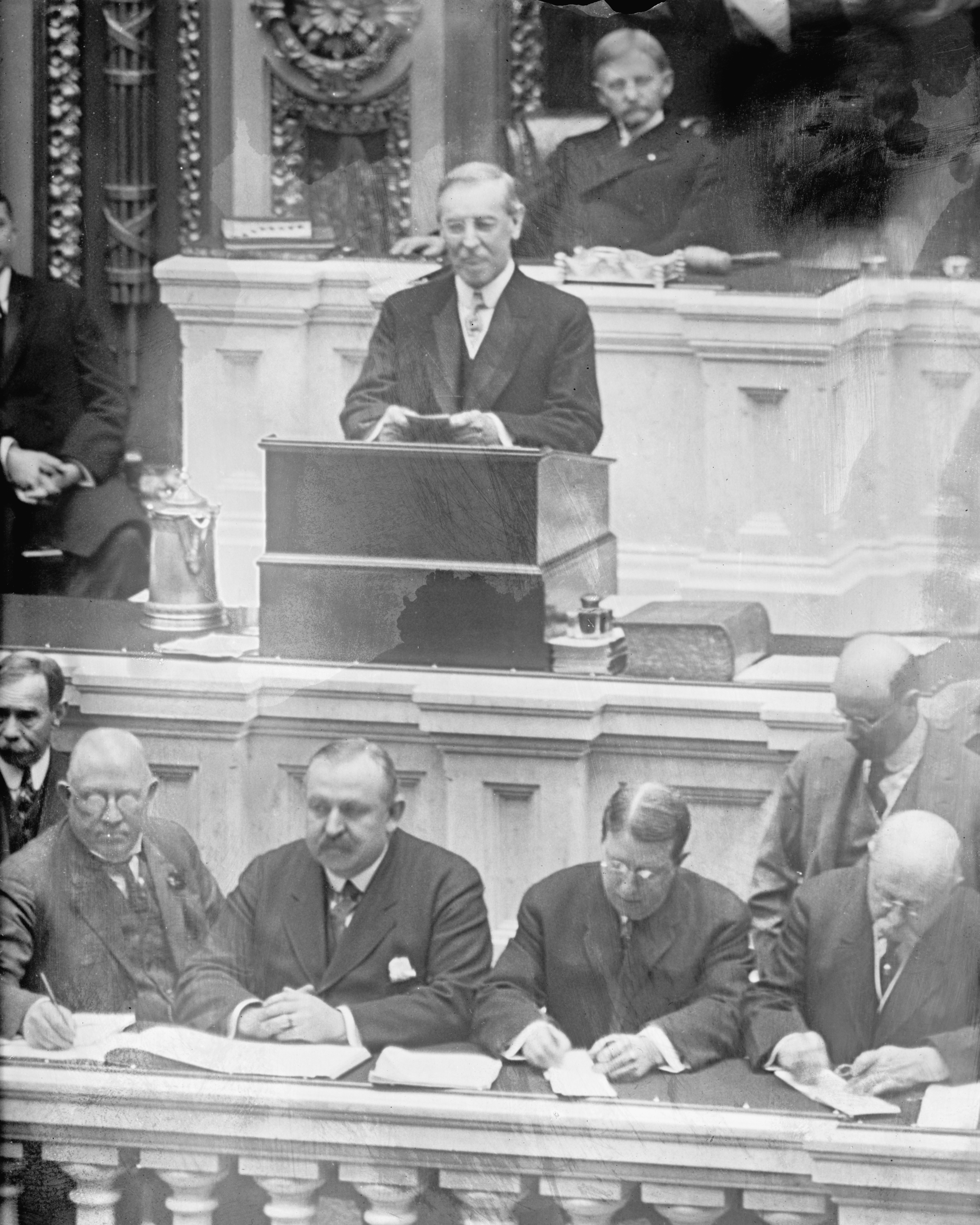
President Woodrow Wilson giving his first State of the Union address on December 2, 1913. This was the first time since 1801 that such an address was made in person before a joint session of Congress, initiating the modern trend with regard to the State of the Union address.

The State of the Union address (sometimes abbreviated to SOTU) is an annual message delivered by the president of the United States to a joint session of the United States Congress near the beginning of most calendar years on the current condition of the nation. The speech generally includes reports on the nation's budget, economy, news, agenda, progress, achievements and the president's priorities and legislative proposals.

The address fulfills the requirement in Article II, Section 3, Clause 1 of the U.S. Constitution that the president "shall from time to time give to the Congress Information of the State of the Union, and recommend to their Consideration such Measures as he shall judge necessary and expedient". During most of the country's first century, the president primarily submitted only a written report to Congress. After 1913, Woodrow Wilson, the 28th U.S. president, began the regular practice of delivering the address to Congress in person as a way to rally support for the president's agenda, while also submitting a more detailed report. With the advent of radio and television, the address is now broadcast live in all United States time zones on many networks.

The speech is generally held in January or February, and an invitation to the president is extended to use the chamber of the House by the speaker of the House. Starting in 1981, Ronald Reagan, the 40th U.S. president, began the practice of newly inaugurated presidents delivering an address to Congress in the first year of their term but not designating that speech an official "State of the Union". Reagan is the only president to have delivered a State of the Union speech on his birthday; he did so on February 6, 1985, his 74th birthday.

== Formality ==
The practice arises from a duty of the president under the State of the Union Clause of the U.S. Constitution:

He shall from time to time give to the Congress information of the State of the Union and recommend to their Consideration such Measures as he shall judge necessary and expedient.

— Article II, Section 3 of the U.S. Constitution

Though the language of the clause is not specific, since the 1930s, the president has made this report annually in late January or early February. Between 1934 and 2024 the date has been as early as January 3, and as late as March 7.

While not required to deliver a speech, every president since Woodrow Wilson, with the notable exception of Herbert Hoover, has made at least one State of the Union report as a speech delivered before a joint session of Congress. Before then, most presidents delivered the State of the Union as a written report.

Since Franklin Roosevelt, the State of the Union is given typically each January before a joint session of the United States Congress and is held in the House of Representatives chamber of the United States Capitol. Newly inaugurated presidents generally deliver an address to Congress in February of the first year of their term, but this speech is not officially considered to be a "State of the Union".

What began as a communication between president and Congress has become in effect a communication between the president and the people of the United States. Since the advent of radio, and then television, the speech has been broadcast live in all United States time zones on most networks, preempting scheduled programming. Since at least the 1960s, in order to reach the largest audience, the speech has typically been given at 9 p.m. (Eastern Time, UTC−5).

== History ==
George Washington's handwritten notes for the first State of the Union Address, January 8, 1790. Full 7 pages.

George Washington delivered the first regular annual message before a joint session of Congress on January 8, 1790, in New York City, then the provisional U.S. capital. In 1801, Thomas Jefferson discontinued the practice of delivering the address in person, regarding it as too monarchical, similar to the speech from the throne. Instead, the address was written and sent to Congress to be read by a clerk until 1913, when Woodrow Wilson re-established the practice despite some initial controversy. An in-person address to Congress has been delivered nearly every year since.

There have been exceptions to this rule, with some messages being given solely in writing, and others given both in writing and orally, either in a speech to Congress or through broadcast media. The last president to give a written message without a spoken address was Jimmy Carter in 1981, days before his term ended after his defeat by Ronald Reagan.

For many years, the speech was referred to as "the President's Annual Message to Congress". The actual term "State of the Union" first emerged in 1934 when Franklin D. Roosevelt used the phrase, becoming its generally accepted name since 1947.

State of the Union (Four Freedoms)
(January 6, 1941)
Franklin Delano Roosevelt's January 6,
1941 State of the Union Address,
introducing the theme of the
Four Freedoms (starting at 32:02)

Prior to 1934, the annual message was delivered at the end of the calendar year, in December. The ratification of the 20th Amendment on January 23, 1933, changed the opening of Congress from early March to early January, affecting the delivery of the annual message. Since 1934, the message or address has been delivered to Congress early in the calendar year.

The Twentieth Amendment also established January 20 as the beginning of the presidential term. In years when a new president is inaugurated, the outgoing president may deliver a final State of the Union message, but none has done so since Jimmy Carter sent a written message in 1981. In 1953 and 1961, Congress received both a written State of the Union message from the outgoing president and a separate State of the Union speech by the incoming president. Since 1981, in recognition that the responsibility of reporting the State of the Union formally belongs to the president who held office during the past year, newly inaugurated presidents have not officially called their first speech before Congress a "State of the Union" message.

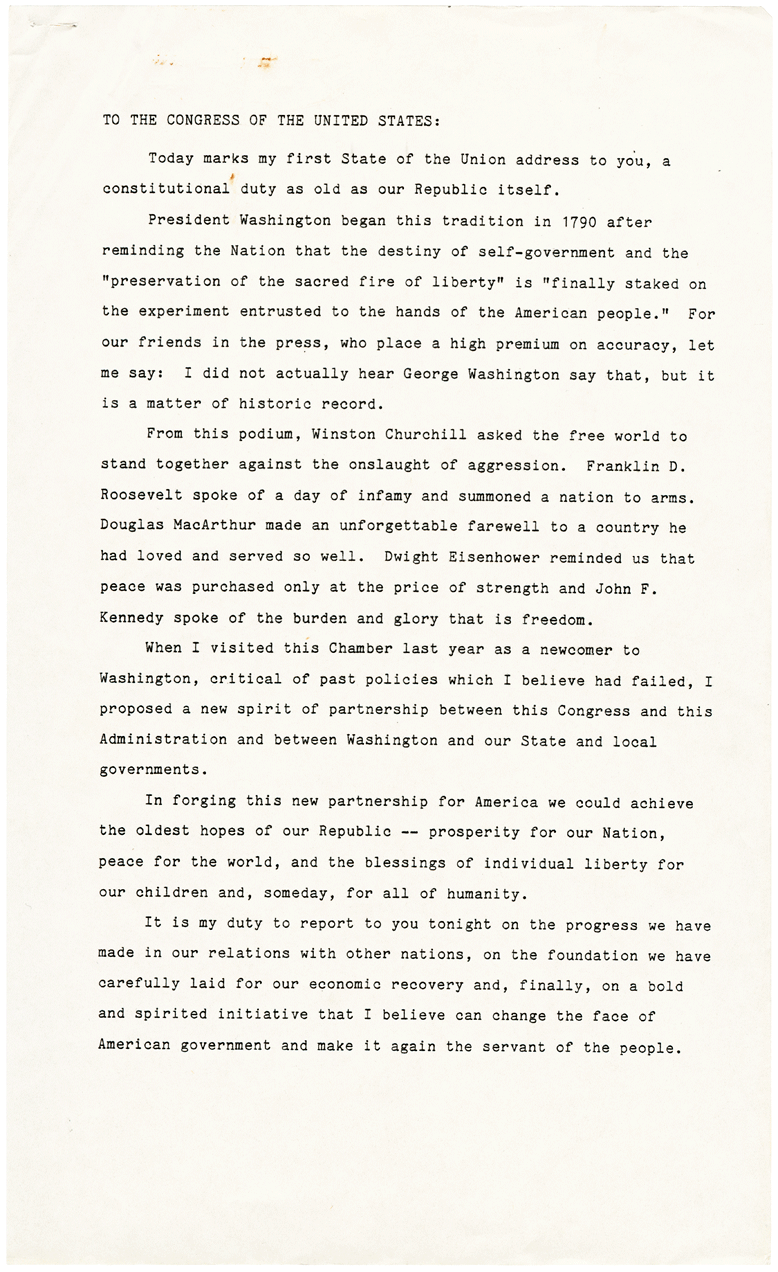
The text of the first page of Ronald Reagan's first State of the Union Address, given January 26, 1982

Warren Harding's 1922 speech was the first to be broadcast on radio, albeit to a limited audience, while Calvin Coolidge's 1923 speech was the first to be broadcast across the nation. President Roosevelt's address in 1936 was the first delivered in the evening, but this precedent was not followed again until the 1960s. Harry S. Truman's 1947 address was the first to be broadcast on television. In 1968, television networks in the United States for the first time imposed no time limit for their coverage of a State of the Union address. Delivered by Lyndon B. Johnson, this address was followed by extensive televised commentary by, among others, Daniel Patrick Moynihan and Milton Friedman. Bill Clinton's 1997 address was the first broadcast available live on the World Wide Web.

Ronald Reagan's 1986 State of the Union Address was the first to have been postponed. He had planned to deliver the speech on January 28, 1986, but it was delayed for a week following the Space Shuttle Challenger disaster that morning. Reagan instead addressed the nation from the Oval Office about the disaster.

In 1999, Bill Clinton became the first president to deliver an in-person State of the Union address while standing trial for impeachment; the speech occurred the same day that Clinton's defense team made its opening statement in Clinton's impeachment trial, though he did not mention the proceeding.

On January 23, 2019, the 2019 State of the Union speech by Donald Trump, originally planned for January 29 was canceled after an exchange of letters with Speaker of the House Nancy Pelosi in which she stated she would not proceed with a vote on a resolution to permit him to deliver the speech in the House chamber until the end of 2018–19 United States federal government shutdown. This decision rescinded an earlier invitation from the speaker, reportedly the first time in American history that a speaker had "disinvited" the president from delivering the address. Trump and Pelosi later agreed to hold the speech on February 5.

== Delivery of the speech ==
Because the address is made to a joint session of Congress, the House and Senate must each pass a resolution setting a date and time for the joint session. Then, a formal invitation is made by the speaker of the House to the president typically several weeks before the appointed date.

=== Invitations ===
Every member of Congress can bring one guest to the State of the Union address. The president may invite up to 24 guests to be seated in a box with the first lady. The speaker of the House may invite up to 24 guests in the speaker's box. Seating for Congress on the main floor is by a first-in, first-served basis with no reservations. The Cabinet, Supreme Court justices, members of the Diplomatic Corps, and military leaders (the Joint Chiefs of Staff and commandant of the Coast Guard) have reserved seating.

=== Protocol of entry into the House chamber ===
By approximately 8:30 p.m. on the night of the address, the members of the House have gathered in their seats for the joint session. Then, the deputy sergeant at arms addresses the speaker and loudly announces the vice president and members of the Senate, who enter and take the seats assigned for them.

The speaker, and then the vice president, specify the members of the House and Senate, respectively, who will escort the president into the House chamber. The deputy sergeant at arms addresses the speaker again and loudly announces, in order, the dean of the Diplomatic Corps, the chief justice of the United States and the associate justices, and the Cabinet, each of whom enters and takes their seats when called. The justices take the seats nearest to the speaker's rostrum and adjacent to the sections reserved for the Cabinet and the members of the Joint Chiefs of Staff.

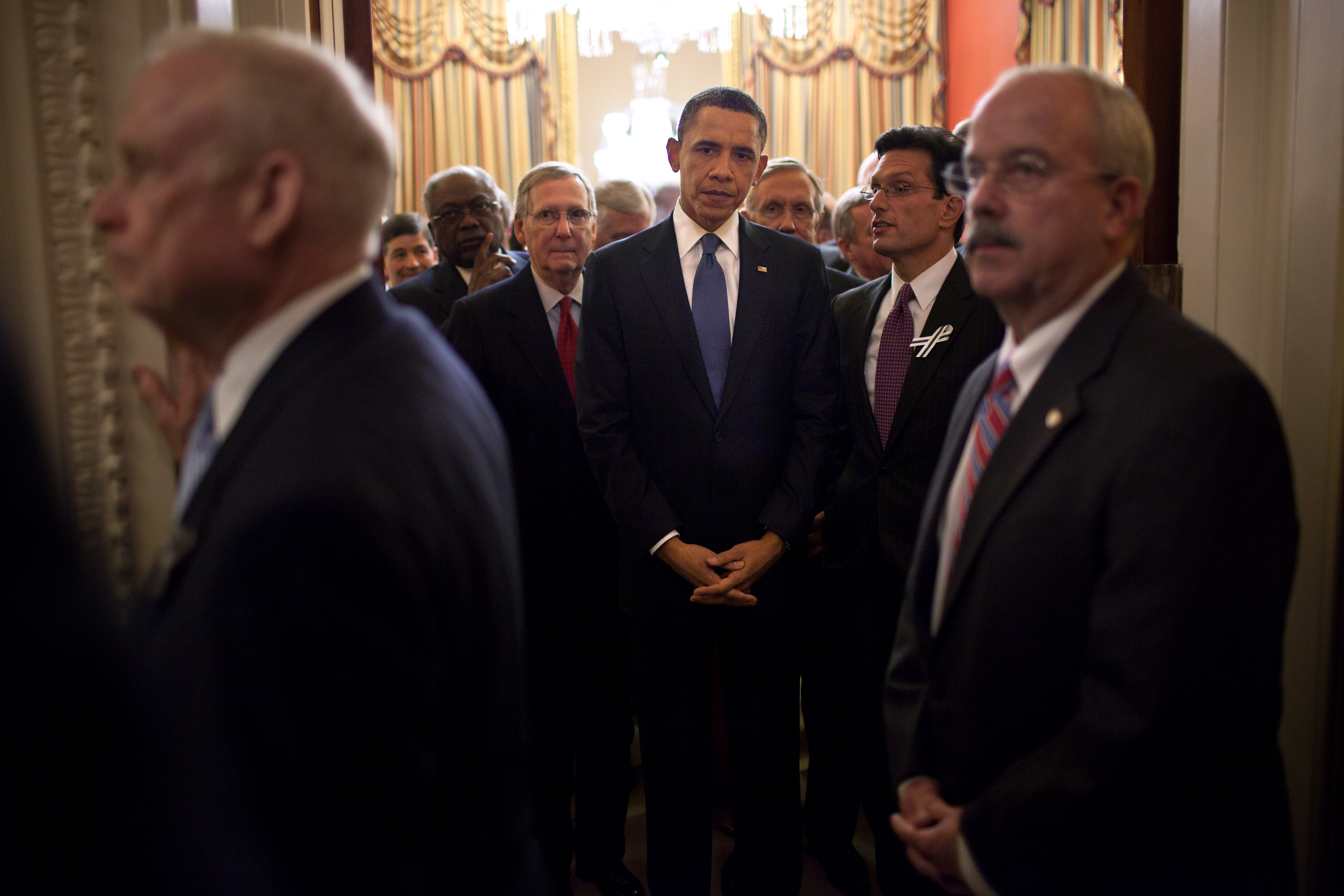
The sergeants at arms of the House (left) and of the Senate (right) wait at the doorway to the House chamber before President Barack Obama enters to deliver the 2011 State of the Union Address.

Just after 9:00 pm, as the president reaches the door to the chamber, the House sergeant at arms stands just inside the doors, faces the speaker, and waits until the president is ready to enter the chamber. When the president is ready, the sergeant at arms announces the entrance, loudly stating the phrase: "Mister/Madam Speaker, the president of the United States!"

As applause and cheering begin, the president slowly walks toward the speaker's rostrum, followed by members of the congressional escort committee. The president's approach is slowed by pausing to shake hands, hug, kiss, and autograph copies of the speech for members of Congress. After taking a place at the clerk's desk, the president hands two envelopes containing copies of the speech to the speaker and vice president. The ovation lasts an average of 2 to 3 minutes

After continuing applause from the attendees has diminished, the speaker introduces the president to the representatives and senators, typically stating: "Members of Congress, I have the high privilege and distinct honor of presenting to you the President of the United States." This leads to a further round of applause and, eventually, the beginning of the address by the president. The speaker may opt not to introduce the president, as was demonstrated in 2019 and 2024.

=== Designated survivor and other logistics ===
President George W. Bush with Senate President (U.S. vice president) Dick Cheney and House Speaker Nancy Pelosi during the 2007 State of the Union Address. It marked the first time that a woman occupied the House Speaker chair.

Customarily, one cabinet member (the designated survivor) does not attend the speech, in order to provide continuity in the line of succession if a catastrophe disables the president, the vice president, and other succeeding officers gathered in the House chamber. Since the September 11 attacks in 2001, a few members of Congress have been asked to relocate to undisclosed locations for the duration of the speech to form a rump Congress in the event of a disaster. Since 2003, each chamber of Congress has formally named a separate designated survivor.

President Joe Biden with Senate President (U.S. vice president) Kamala Harris and House Speaker Pelosi during the 2021 joint session address. It marked the first time that a woman had occupied the Senate President chair. As this speech occurred early during Biden's first year, it is not considered an official State of the Union.

Both the speaker and the vice president sit at the speaker's desk, behind the president for the duration of the speech. If either is unavailable, the next highest-ranking member of the respective house substitutes. Once the chamber settles down from the president's arrival, the speaker officially presents the president to the joint session of Congress. The president then delivers the speech from the podium at the front of the House Chamber.

For the 2011 address, Senator Mark Udall of Colorado proposed a break in the tradition of seating Republicans and Democrats on opposite sides of the House; this was in response to the 2011 Tucson Shooting in which Representative Gabby Giffords was shot and wounded in an assassination attempt. Approximately 60 legislators signed on to Udall's proposal; a similar plan for the 2012 address garnered bipartisan seating commitments from more than 160 lawmakers. Efforts to intersperse the parties during the State of the Union have since waned, and by the 2016 address, seating had largely returned to the traditional partisan arrangement.

=== Content of the speech ===
The contents of the speeches typically contain information and status updates of the country and federal government during the incumbent president's administration. It has become customary to use the phrase "The State of the Union is strong", sometimes with slight variations, since President Ronald Reagan introduced it in his 1983 address. It has been repeated by every president in nearly every year since, with the exception of George H. W. Bush. Gerald Ford's 1975 address had been the first to use the phrasing "The State of the Union is...", though Ford completed the sentence with "not good."

Since Reagan's 1982 address, it has also become common for presidents of both parties to honor special guests sitting in the gallery, such as American citizens or visiting heads of state. During that 1982 address, Reagan acknowledged Lenny Skutnik for his act of heroism following the crash of Air Florida Flight 90. Since then, the term "Lenny Skutniks" has been used to refer to individuals invited to sit in the gallery, and then cited by the president, during the State of the Union.

State of the Union speeches usually last a little over an hour, partly because of the large amounts of applause that occur from the audience throughout. The applause is often political in tone, with many portions of the speech being applauded only by members of the president's own party. As non-political officeholders, members of the Supreme Court or the Joint Chiefs of Staff rarely applaud in order to retain the appearance of political impartiality. In recent years, the presiding officers of the House and the Senate, the speaker and the vice president, respectively, have departed from the neutrality expected of presiding officers of deliberative bodies, as they, too, stand and applaud in response to the remarks of the president with which they agree.

== Opposition response ==
Since 1966, the speech has been followed on television by a response or rebuttal by a member of the major political party opposing the president's party. The response is typically broadcast from a studio with no audience. In 1970, the Democratic Party put together a TV program with their speech to reply to President Nixon, as well as a televised response to Nixon's written speech in 1973. The same was done by Democrats for President Reagan's speeches in 1982 and 1985.

The response is not always produced in a studio. In 1997, the Republicans for the first time delivered the response in front of high school students. In 2010, Virginia governor Bob McDonnell gave the Republican response from the House of Delegates chamber of the Virginia State Capitol in Richmond, in front of about 250 attendees.

In 2004, the Democratic Party's response was delivered in Spanish for the first time, by New Mexico governor Bill Richardson. In 2011, Minnesota congresswoman Michele Bachmann also gave a televised response for the Tea Party Express, a first for a political movement. In 2024, the Republican response was delivered by Senator Katie Britt on March 8 (Women's International Day) from her kitchen table. The first Independent response was delivered by Robert F. Kennedy Jr.

== Significance ==
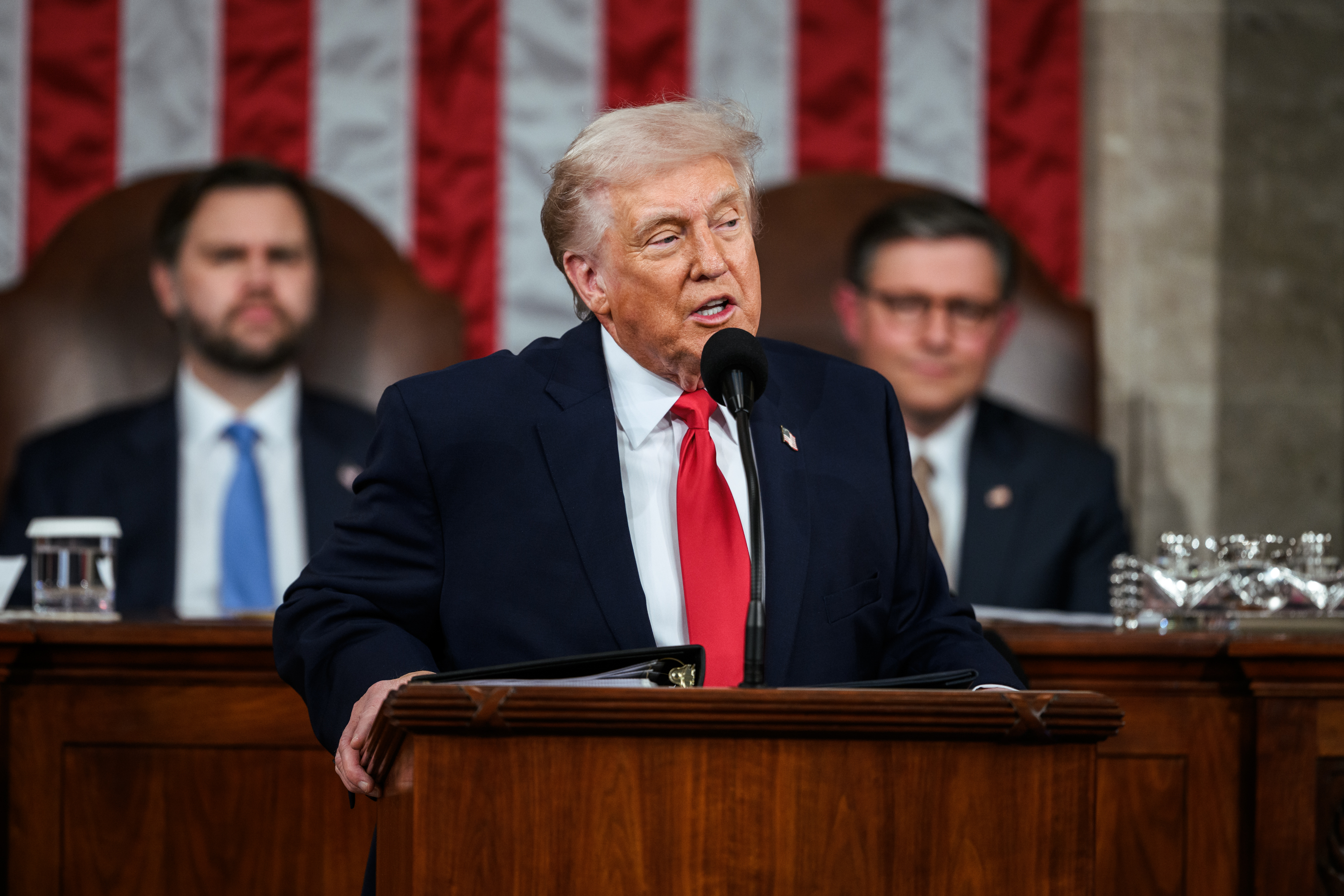
President Donald Trump giving his sixth State of the Union address on February 24, 2026. At 1 hour and 48 minutes, this was the longest State of the Union address, as well as the longest speech to ever be given before a joint session of Congress, in American history.

Although much of the pomp and ceremony behind the State of the Union address is governed by tradition rather than law, in modern times, the event is seen as one of the most important in the US political calendar. It is one of the few instances when all three branches of the US government are assembled under one roof: members of both houses of Congress constituting the legislature, the president and Cabinet constituting the executive, and the chief justice and associate justices of the Supreme Court constituting the judiciary.

The military is represented by the Joint Chiefs of Staff, while foreign governments are represented by the dean of the Diplomatic Corps. The address has also been used as an opportunity to honor the achievements of some ordinary Americans, who are typically invited by the president to sit with the first lady.

== Local versions ==
Certain U.S. states have a similar annual address given by the governor. For most of them, it is called the State of the State address. In Iowa, it is called the Condition of the State Address. In Kentucky, Massachusetts, Pennsylvania, and Virginia, the speech is called the State of the Commonwealth address. The mayor of the District of Columbia gives a State of the District address. American Samoa has a State of the Territory address given by the governor. Puerto Rico has a State Address given by the governor. In Guam, the governor delivers an annual State of the Island Address.

Some cities or counties have an annual State of the City Address given by the mayor, county commissioner or board chair, including Sonoma County, California; Orlando, Florida; Gwinnett County, Georgia; Cincinnati, Ohio; New Haven, Connecticut; Parma, Ohio; Detroit, Michigan; Seattle, Washington; Birmingham, Alabama; Boston, Massachusetts; Los Angeles, California; Buffalo, New York; Rochester, New York; San Antonio, Texas; McAllen, Texas; and San Diego, California. The Mayor of the Metropolitan Government of Nashville and Davidson County in Nashville, Tennessee gives a speech similar called the State of Metro Address. Some university presidents give a State of the University address at the beginning of every academic term.

Some elementary and secondary schools and school districts hold a "State of the School(s)" address at the beginning of each calendar year. Private companies usually have a "State of the Corporation" or "State of the Company" address given by the respective CEO. The commissioners of some North American professional sports leagues, in particular Major League Soccer and the Canadian Football League, deliver annual "State of the League" addresses, usually in conjunction with events surrounding their respective leagues' championship games.

=== European Union ===
The State of the Union model has been adopted by the European Union.

=== France ===
In France, President Emmanuel Macron initiated a similar event in 2017, again in 2018, but the practice did not continue the following years.

=== Spain ===
In Spain, the Congress of Deputies adopted the tradition under the name "Debate on the State of the Nation" in 1983. The prime minister gives an address for an undetermined length of time, and afterwards each of the parliamentary groups have the chance to respond in an address with a maximum length of thirty minutes. These are sorted by the amount of deputies that each parliamentary group holds, thus starting with the leader of the Opposition. Since its creation, it has taken place in every non-election year except for 2021, where Prime Minister Pedro Sánchez was forced to cancel it due to the COVID-19 pandemic.

=== Argentina ===
In Argentina, the president delivers an annual speech, in which he details the state of the country and announces the bills that the Executive Branch may send to Congress in the coming year. This speech is known as Opening of regular sessions of the National Congress and it is usually held in march.

=== Singapore ===
Singapore begun adopting their tradition of their country's annual speech one year after the country's independence in 1965, known as the National Day Rally. The speech is delivered by the Prime Minister, which outlined the future of Singapore and the plans ahead in time. Originally as a closed-door pre-recorded speech between the Prime Minister and grassroots leaders, but the Rally has since become a live special and is opened to audience over the years. The National Day Rally originally occur on the eve of the National Day on August 8, but has changed to the week after the National Day on August 16, before occurring on a Sunday in-between National Day and end of the month of August since the 1970 iteration.

=== Uruguay ===
In Uruguay, Article 168(5) of the Constitution provides that the President must "inform the Legislative Branch, at the opening of the ordinary sessions, on the state of the Republic". Pursuant to this provision, the President delivers an annual address to a joint session of the General Assembly, held at the beginning of the legislative year in early March. In the address, the President reports on the government's activities during the preceding year and outlines its main priorities and policies for the year ahead.

== Historic speeches ==
Franklin Roosevelt proposing a Second Bill of Rights, 1944

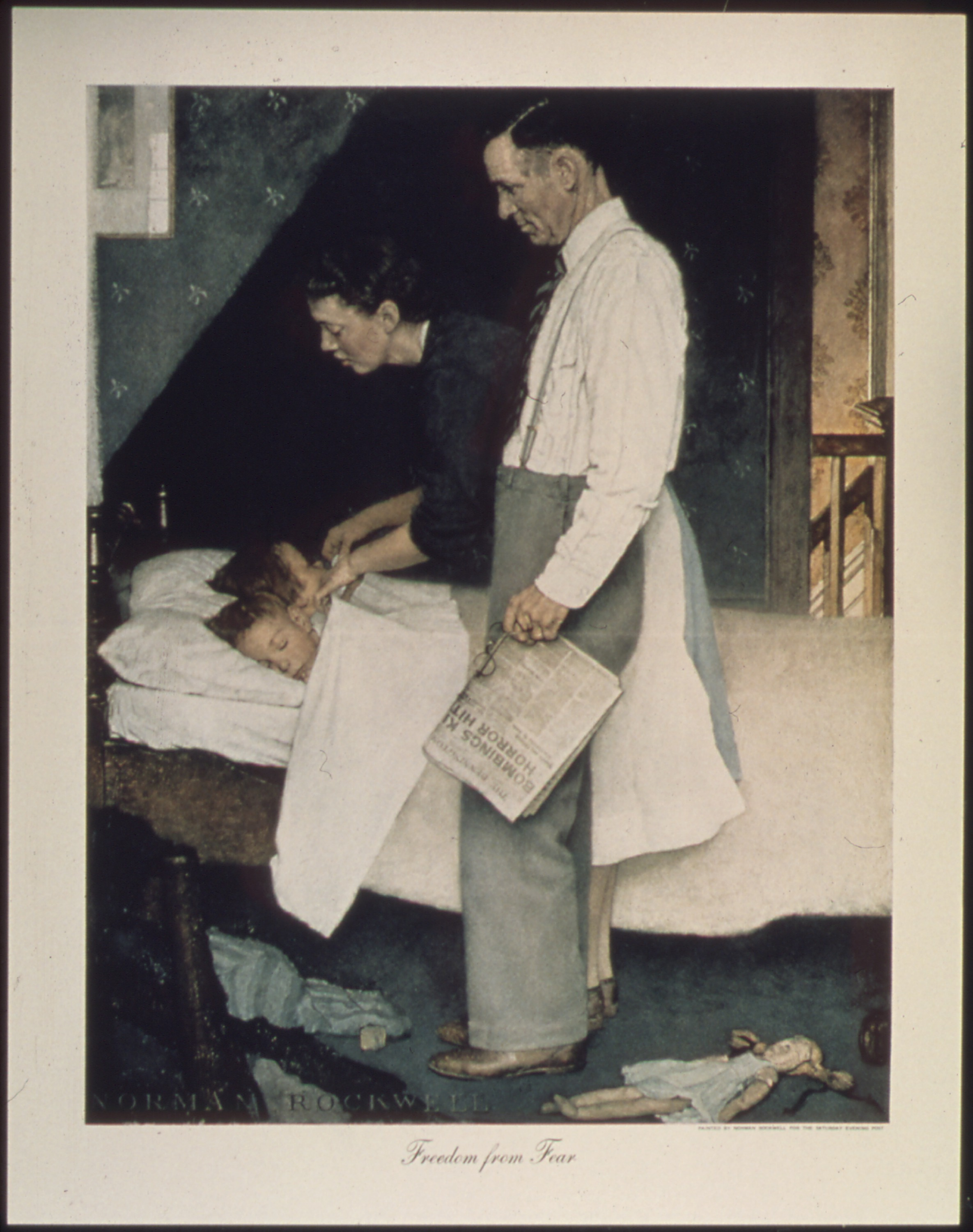
Freedom from Fear from Norman Rockwell, 1943

- President James Monroe first stated the Monroe Doctrine during his seventh annual State of the Union Address to Congress on December 2, 1823. It became a defining moment in the foreign policy of the United States and one of its longest-standing tenets, and would be invoked by many U.S. statesmen and several U.S. presidents, including Theodore Roosevelt, John F. Kennedy, and Ronald Reagan.
- The Four Freedoms were goals first articulated by Franklin D. Roosevelt on January 6, 1941. In an address known as the Four Freedoms speech, he proposed four fundamental freedoms that people "everywhere in the world" ought to enjoy: freedom of speech and expression, freedom of worship, freedom from want, and freedom from fear.
- During his State of the Union Address on January 11, 1944, FDR proposed the Second Bill of Rights. Roosevelt's argument was that the "political rights" guaranteed by the constitution and the Bill of Rights had "proved inadequate to assure us equality in the pursuit of happiness". This was technically a "Message" and not a speech, as Roosevelt had "a case of the grippe" and could not come; there was no joint session, and a Senate clerk read the message. (Although he did manage to read it as a Fireside Chat over the radio, from his office that same day.)
- During his State of the Union address on January 8, 1964, Lyndon B. Johnson introduced legislation that would come to be known as the War on Poverty. This legislation was proposed by Johnson in response to a national poverty rate of around nineteen percent. The speech led the United States Congress to pass the Economic Opportunity Act, which established the Office of Economic Opportunity (OEO) to administer the local application of federal funds targeted against poverty.
- During his State of the Union address on January 15, 1975, Gerald R. Ford very bluntly stated that "the state of the Union is not good: Millions of Americans are out of work.... We depend on others for essential energy. Some people question their Government's ability to make hard decisions and stick with them; they expect Washington politics as usual." Ford said he did not "expect much if any, applause. The American people want action, and it will take both the Congress and the president to give them what they want. Progress and solutions can be achieved, and they will be achieved."

George W. Bush delivering the 2002 State of the Union

- During his State of the Union address on January 29, 2002, President Bush identified North Korea, Iran, and Iraq as representing significant threats to the United States. He said, "States like these and their terrorist allies constitute an axis of evil, arming to threaten the peace of the world". In this speech, he outlined objectives for the war on terror.

== TV ratings ==
Television ratings for recent State of the Union addresses
| Date | President | Viewers, millions | Households, millions | Rating | Networks |
|---|---|---|---|---|---|
| 2026-02-24 | Donald Trump | 32.6 | 23.2 | 18.1 | ABC, CBS, FOX, NBC, EstrellaTV, Telemundo, Univision, PBS, CNN, CNN en Espanol, FOX Business, FOX News Channel, MSNow, Newsmax, NewsNation |
| 2025-03-04 | Donald Trump | 36.6 | 25.2 | 20.0 | ABC, CBS, FOX, NBC, Merit Street, TEL, UNI, PBS, CNN, CNNe, FBN, FOXNC, MSNBC, NewsMax, NewsNation |
| 2024-03-07 | Joe Biden | 32.3 | 23.2 | 18.5 | ABC, CBS, NBC, FOX, Telemundo, Univision, PBS, CNN, CNNe, Fox Business, Fox News Channel, MSNBC, Newsmax, NewsNation |
| 2023-02-07 | Joe Biden | 27.3 | 20.0 | 16.1 | ABC, CBS, NBC, FOX, Telemundo, Univision, PBS, CNBC, CNN, CNNe, Fox Business, Fox News Channel, MSNBC, NBCLX, NewsMax, NewsNation |
| 2022-03-01 | Joe Biden | 38.20 | 27.41 | 22.4 | ABC, CBS, NBC, FOX, Telemundo, Univision, PBS, Black News Channel, CNBC, CNN, CNNe, Fox Business, Fox News Channel, MNBC, NBCLX, Newsmax, NewsNation |
| 2021-04-28 | Joe Biden | 26.90 | 19.95 | 16.5 | ABC, CBS, NBC, FOX, Telemundo, Univision, PBS, CNN, CNNe, CNBC, Fox Business, Fox News Channel, MSNBC, Newsmax, NewsNation, Newsy |
| 2020-02-04 | Donald Trump | 37.17 | 27.46 | 22.7 | ABC, CBS, NBC, FOX, Telemundo, Univision, PBS, CNN, CNNe, Fox Business, Fox News Channel, MSNBC |
| 2019-02-05 | Donald Trump | 46.79 | 33.62 | 28.0 | ABC, CBS, NBC, FOX, Telemundo, Univision, PBS, CNN, CNNe, FOX Business, Fox News Channel, MSNBC |
| 2018-01-30 | Donald Trump | 45.55 | 32.17 | 26.9 | ABC, CBS, NBC, FOX, Telemundo, Univision, PBS, CNN, Estrella, FOX Business, Fox News Channel, MSNBC |
| 2017-02-28 | Donald Trump | 47.7 | | 28.7 | ABC, CBS, NBC, FOX, Telemundo, Univision, PBS, CNN, Estrella, FOX Business, Fox News Channel, MSNBC |
| 2016-01-12 | Barack Obama | 31.33 | 23.04 | 19.6 | ABC, CBS, NBC, FOX, Univision, Al Jazeera America, Azteca America, CNN, FOX Business, Fox News Channel, Galavision, MSNBC, NBC Universo |
| 2015-01-20 | Barack Obama | 31.71 | 23.14 | 19.9 | ABC, CBS, NBC, FOX, Univision, Al Jazeera America, Azteca America, CNN, FOX Business, Fox News Channel, Galavision, MSNBC, MundoFox |
| 2014-01-28 | Barack Obama | 33.30 | 23.95 | 20.7 | ABC, CBS, NBC, FOX, Univision, Al Jazeera America, Azteca America, CNBC, CNN, FOX Business, Fox News Channel, Galavision, MSNBC, MUN2 |
| 2013-02-12 | Barack Obama | 33.50 | 24.77 | 21.8 | ABC, CBS, NBC, FOX, Univision, PBS, Azteca America, Centric, CNBC, CNN, Current, FOX Business, Fox News Channel, Galavision, MSNBC, MundoFox |
| 2012-01-24 | Barack Obama | 37.75 | 27.57 | 24.0 | ABC, CBS, NBC, FOX, Telemundo, Univision, CNBC, CNN, FOX Business, Fox News Channel, Galavision, MSNBC, MUN2, Telefutura |
| 2011-01-25 | Barack Obama | 42.79 | 30.87 | 26.6 | ABC, CBS, NBC, FOX, Telemundo, Univision, CNN, Centric, CNBC, Fox News Channel, MSNBC |
| 2010-01-27 | Barack Obama | 48.01 | 34.18 | 29.8 | ABC, CBS, NBC, FOX, Telemundo, Univision, CNN, BET, CNBC, Fox News Channel, MSNBC |
| 2009-02-24 | Barack Obama | 52.37 | 37.18 | 32.5 | ABC, CBS, NBC, FOX, Telemundo, Univision, CNN, Fox News Channel, MSNBC |
| 2008-01-28 | George W. Bush | 37.52 | 27.70 | 24.7 | ABC, CBS, NBC, FOX, Telemundo, Univision, CNN, Fox News Channel, MSNBC |
| 2007-01-23 | George W. Bush | 45.49 | 32.97 | 29.6 | ABC, CBS, NBC, FOX, Telemundo, Univision, CNN, Fox News Channel, MSNBC |
| 2006-01-31 | George W. Bush | 43.18 | 30.53 | 31.2 | ABC, CBS, NBC, FOX, Telemundo, CNN, Fox News Channel, MSNBC, Azteca America, Telefutura |
| 2005-02-02 | George W. Bush | 39.43 | 28.36 | 35.3 | ABC, CBS, NBC, FOX, Telemundo, CNN, Fox News Channel, MSNBC, Telefutura |
| 2004-01-20 | George W. Bush | 43.41 | 30.29 | 28.0 | ABC, CBS, NBC, FOX, CNN, CNBC, Fox News Channel, MSNBC |
| 2003-01-28 | George W. Bush | 62.06 | 41.48 | 38.8 | ABC, CBS, NBC, FOX, CNN, CNBC, Fox News Channel, MSNBC |
| 2002-01-29 | George W. Bush | 51.77 | 35.55 | 33.6 | ABC, CBS, NBC, FOX, CNN, CNBC, Fox News Channel, MSNBC |
| 2001-02-27 | George W. Bush | 39.79 | TBA | 27.6 | ABC, CBS, FOX, NBC, CNN, FOXNC, MSNBC |
| 2000-01-27 | Bill Clinton | 31.48 | 22.54 | 22.4 | ABC, CBS, NBC, FOX, CNN, Fox News Channel, MSNBC |
| 1999-01-19 | Bill Clinton | 43.50 | 30.70 | 31.0 | ABC, CBS, NBC, FOX, CNN, Fox News Channel, MSNBC |
| 1998-01-27 | Bill Clinton | 53.08 | 36.51 | 37.2 | ABC, CBS, NBC, FOX, CNN, Fox News Channel, MSNBC, CNBC |
| 1997-02-04 | Bill Clinton | 41.10 | 27.60 | 28.4 | ABC, CBS, NBC, FOX, CNN |
| 1996-01-23 | Bill Clinton | 40.90 | 28.40 | 29.6 | ABC, CBS, NBC, FOX, CNN |
| 1995-01-24 | Bill Clinton | 42.20 | 28.10 | 29.5 | ABC, CBS, NBC, CNN |
| 1994-01-25 | Bill Clinton | 45.80 | 31.00 | 32.9 | ABC, CBS, NBC, CNN |
| 1993-02-17 | Bill Clinton | 66.90 | TBA | 44.3 | ABC, CBS, NBC, CNN |

== See also ==
- List of State of the Union addresses
- List of joint sessions of the United States Congress
- State Opening of Parliament
- Weekly address of the president of the United States
- United States Oval Office Address
- United States presidential address to the United Nations General Assembly
