= 2007 State of the Union Address =

Speech by US President George W. Bush

- Full video of the speech as published by the White House
- Date: January 23, 2007
- Time: 9:00 p.m. EST
- Duration: 49 minutes
- Venue: House Chamber, United States Capitol
- Location: Washington, D.C.; 38°53′19.8″N 77°00′32.8″W
- Type: State of the Union Address
- Participants: George W. Bush; Dick Cheney; Nancy Pelosi
- Previous: 2006 State of the Union Address
- Next: 2008 State of the Union Address

The 2007 State of the Union Address was given by the 43rd president of the United States, George W. Bush, on January 23, 2007, at 9:00 p.m. EST, in the chamber of the United States House of Representatives to the 110th United States Congress. It was Bush's sixth State of the Union Address and his seventh speech to a joint session of the United States Congress. Presiding over this joint session was the House speaker, Nancy Pelosi, accompanied by Dick Cheney, the vice president, in his capacity as the president of the Senate.

It was the first address to a Democratic-controlled Congress since 1994. Furthermore, the speech marked the second time that a Democrat sat behind President Bush during a joint session of Congress and the first time at a State of the Union address. Traditionally, the Speaker of the House and the Vice President (the President of the Senate) are the only individuals on the rostrum with the President. However, in a joint session of Congress on September 20, 2001, following the September 11 attacks nine days earlier, president pro tempore Robert Byrd, a Democrat, took the place of Vice President Cheney, who was at an undisclosed location. As the first female Speaker of the House, Nancy Pelosi is also the first woman in American history to stand on the podium during a State of the Union address.

President Bush began his address by recognizing the new House Speaker Nancy Pelosi:

And tonight I have the high privilege and distinct honor of my own as the first president to begin the State of the Union message with these words: Madam Speaker.

== Attendance ==
Attorney General Alberto Gonzales was not present because traditionally a member of the President's cabinet, a designated survivor, does not attend in order to ensure presidential succession in the event of an emergency. Only four Supreme Court Justices attended the speech: Chief Justice John Roberts and Associate Justices Stephen Breyer, Samuel Alito, and Anthony Kennedy. Senator Tim Johnson and Congressman Charlie Norwood were not present because of serious health problems, but were acknowledged with applause. Johnson recovered and returned to work by September, while Norwood died on February 13, 2007.

== Speech ==
President George W. Bush delivering the State of the Union Address before a joint session of U.S. Congress

The President's speech focused equally on domestic policy and foreign policy.

=== Domestic policy ===
Bush placed emphasis on balancing the federal budget, eliminating excessive earmarks, changing the tax code to replace the existing business tax exemption to workers health insurance premiums with a new personal health insurance deduction, providing health care for needy individuals, and expanding health savings accounts. Bush supported "laws that are fair and borders that are secure" in regards to immigration, suggesting a temporary worker program, stating that, "[a]s a result, they won't have to try to sneak in". He suggested resolving the status of current illegal residents "without animosity and without amnesty".

Bush said the United States has been dependent on foreign oil for too long, and that this chances placing it in hostile situations. Bush asked Congress to work to reduce gasoline usage in the United States by 20 percent over the next ten years, and recommended research into alternative fuels. He asked Congress to "double the current capacity" of the Strategic Petroleum Reserve. In what appears to be a change of stance, Bush made a connection between energy policy and climate change: "America is on the verge of technological breakthroughs that will enable us to live our lives less dependent on oil. And these technologies will help us be better stewards of the environment, and they will help us to confront the serious challenge of global climate change." Bush specifically named plug-in hybrid vehicles as part of his "advanced energy initiative" to help end the United States "addiction to oil."

Bush asked Congress to give future federal court nominees a "fair hearing", and a "prompt up-or-down vote on the Senate floor."

In the realm of education, he asked Congress to renew the No Child Left Behind Act and consider school vouchers, although he never mentioned vouchers by name.

=== Foreign policy ===
A large part of Bush's speech centered on the Iraq War. Bush emphasized that he still stood behind it, stating that, "to win the War on Terror, we must take the fight to the enemy." He stated that the dangers of terrorism have not ended, and that it is the government's duty to locate terrorists and protect the American people. He stated that it was not responsible to leave Iraq yet, as it would put "ourselves in danger and our friends at risk." He emphasized that stability in Iraq is essential, and that chaos is the enemy's greatest ally. Bush asked Americans to give the Iraq War a chance, and support the troops on the field and "those on their way," a reference to the "surge" strategy involving 20,000 soldiers and Marines sent to Baghdad and al-Anbar, most of which would go to Baghdad.

Bush advocated adding to the ranks of the military. He asked Congress to authorize an increase in the Army and Marine active duty forces by 92,000 in the next five years. He spoke of developing a volunteer Civilian Reserve Corps which could help ease the burden on military personnel: "It would give people across America who do not wear the uniform a chance to serve in the defining struggle of our time." The phrase terror (whether as terror, terrorism, or terrorist) appeared 22 times in his speech, highlighting its continuing significance in his administration's foreign policy and political position.

Bush advocated saving the people affected by the conflict in Darfur, Sudan. He advocated continuing to fight HIV/AIDS, especially in Africa. Bush asked for $1.2 billion over the next five years to combat malaria in 15 African countries.

== Honored guests ==
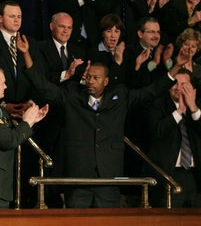
Wesley Autrey at the State of the Union Address

Toward the end of his speech, President Bush recognized four distinguished Americans. First, he pointed out Dikembe Mutombo, a player in the National Basketball Association. He is native to the Democratic Republic of the Congo and recently built a new hospital in Kinshasa, his hometown. Next, he introduced business and social entrepreneur Julie Aigner-Clark, who founded The Baby Einstein Company. Then, he introduced Wesley Autrey who, three weeks prior, saved a man with epilepsy from being run down by a New York City Subway train. Finally, he introduced Sergeant Tommy Rieman, an American soldier who continued to fight even though he was critically injured in Iraq.

== Critical response ==
=== Democratic response ===
Jim Webb, a Vietnam War veteran and Senator from Virginia whose son was serving in Iraq, delivered the Democratic response from Capitol Hill, the second year in a row for a Virginia politician. Virginia Governor Tim Kaine delivered the Democratic response in 2006. It lasted less than nine minutes, as expected, ending at 10:24 EST.

Webb said he hoped the Bush administration is serious about health care, education, and revitalizing the imperiled nation, as represented by New Orleans, Louisiana, following Hurricane Katrina (President Bush did not mention Katrina or New Orleans in his Address). He emphasized that corporate profits are not being fairly shared, stating that chief executive officers make over 400 times that of workers, on average. Therefore, it takes an average worker over one year to make as much money as his boss makes in one day. He advocated a policy that would begin to remove United States troops from Iraq, pointing out that polls show the majority of the American people do not support the direction of the Iraq War or the president's strategy.

=== Libertarian response ===
Steve Kubby, a California politician and declared candidate for the 2008 presidential election, delivered an unofficial response to the address for the Libertarian Party. Kubby criticized the president's policies on the economy, education, and foreign policy, which he referred to as "foreign military adventurism."

=== Conservative response ===
The Wall Street Journal reported in an article the following Thursday that conservatives were upset and felt abandoned by Bush's shifts on immigration and health care, and quoted a high-ranking official with the American Conservative Union saying that "the president left a lot of conservatives shaking their heads".

== Statistics ==
- This address to Congress was the second such speech written with the assistance of White House chief speechwriter William McGurn, who with a team of seasoned writers and researchers spent several weeks working on the speech.
- Keeping his remarks similar in length to the previous year's address to Congress, the President spoke for 49 minutes, and was interrupted for applause 58 times with 28 also being standing ovations.

Preceded by 2006 State of the Union Address	State of the Union addresses 2007	Succeeded by 2008 State of the Union Address
