= Michael Lantz =

American sculptor (1908–1988)

- Born: April 6, 1908; New Rochelle, New York, U.S.
- Died: April 25, 1988 (aged 80); New London, Connecticut, U.S.
- Known for: Sculpture

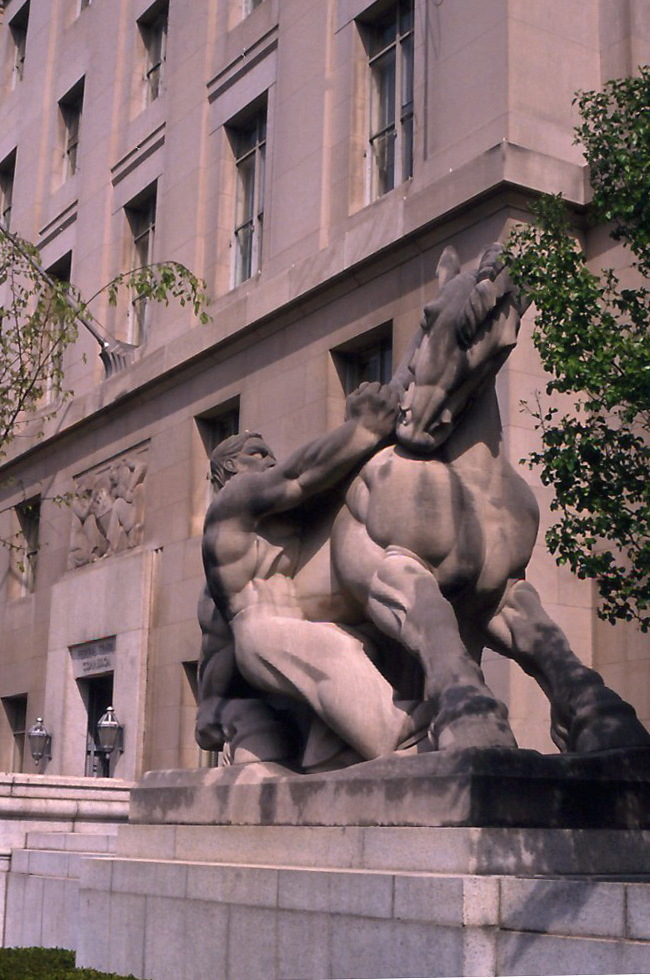
Lantz's statue, Man Controlling Trade, outside the Federal Trade Commission in Washington, D.C.

Michael Lantz (April 6, 1908 – April 25, 1988) was an American sculptor and medalist.

Lantz attended the National Academy of Design and the Beaux-Arts Institute of Design, and also worked as a "handy boy" in the sculptor Lee Lawrie's New York studio for ten years. In 1938, while working as an instructor for the Works Progress Administration (WPA), he won a competition to create two statues for the Federal Trade Commission Building in Washington, D.C. 247 artists entered the anonymous competition organized by the Department of the Treasury. The models that Lantz submitted for the competition are now in the collections of the Smithsonian American Art Museum.

Lantz created other sculptures for buildings and sites across the United States, including a statue of St. Avoid for the Lorraine American Cemetery and Memorial near St. Avoid, France. He also designed commemorative and historical medals and seals, including one in the Smithsonian American Art Museum.

Lantz was a member of the National Sculpture Society, where he was editor of its publication, the Sculpture Review, from 1955 to 1957 and 1973 to 1984, and served as its president from 1970 to 1973. He was awarded the Saltus Award in 1968. In 1951 he was elected into the National Academy of Design as an Associate member and became a full Academician in 1954.

Lantz's brother Walter Lantz is well known as the creator of Woody Woodpecker. The National Sculpture Society awards the Walter and Michael Lantz Prize on an annual basis. Winners include Andrew DeVries in 1991.

== Selected works ==
- Man Controlling Trade at the Apex Building in Washington D.C., Federal Art Project, 1942
- The Bronze Medallion, the highest award conferred upon civilians by New York City
