= 1997 State of the Union Address =

Speech by US President Bill Clinton

- Full video of the speech as published by the White House
- Date: February 4, 1997
- Time: 9:00 p.m. EST
- Duration: 1 hour, 4 minutes
- Venue: House Chamber, United States Capitol
- Location: Washington, D.C.; 38°53′23″N 77°00′32″W
- Type: State of the Union Address
- Participants: Bill Clinton; Al Gore; Newt Gingrich
- Previous: 1996 State of the Union Address
- Next: 1998 State of the Union Address

The 1997 State of the Union Address was given by the 42nd president of the United States, Bill Clinton, on February 4, 1997, at 9:00 p.m. EST, in the chamber of the United States House of Representatives to the 105th United States Congress. It was Clinton's fourth State of the Union Address and his fifth speech to a joint session of the United States Congress. Presiding over this joint session was the House speaker, Newt Gingrich, accompanied by Al Gore, the vice president, in his capacity as the president of the Senate.

President Clinton discussed numerous topics in the address, including the environment, the International Space Station, welfare, crime and relations with NATO and China. The president also focused on a "detailed plan to balance the budget by 2002".

The Republican Party response was delivered by Oklahoma congressman J. C. Watts in front of high school students sponsored by the Close Up Foundation.

The speech did not get the national attention it usually does because the same evening of the speech a verdict was given in the O. J. Simpson civil trial in his ex-wife and her friend's 1994 murders. The White House however refused to postpone the State of the Union Address.

This was the first State of the Union Address carried live on the Internet.

Preceded by 1996 State of the Union Address	State of the Union addresses 1997	Succeeded by 1998 State of the Union Address
