= 2002 State of the Union Address =

Speech by US President George W. Bush

- Full video of the speech as published by the White House
- Date: January 29, 2002
- Time: 9:00 p.m. EST
- Duration: 59 minutes
- Venue: House Chamber, United States Capitol
- Location: Washington, D.C.; 38°53′19.8″N 77°00′32.8″W
- Type: State of the Union Address
- Participants: George W. Bush; Dick Cheney; Dennis Hastert
- Previous: 2001 Joint session speech
- Next: 2003 State of the Union Address

2002 State of the Union Address
George W. Bush delivers his second State of the Union address on January 29, 2002.

The 2002 State of the Union Address was given by the 43rd president of the United States, George W. Bush, on January 29, 2002, at 9:00 p.m. EST, in the chamber of the United States House of Representatives to the 107th United States Congress. It was Bush's first State of the Union Address and his second speech to a joint session of the United States Congress. Presiding over this joint session was the House speaker, Dennis Hastert, accompanied by Dick Cheney, the vice president, in his capacity as the president of the Senate.

In front of members of the 107th United States Congress, along with special civilian and military guests, Bush addressed the U.S. as he delivered his first State of the Union address. The speech covered the effects of the September 11 attacks four months earlier and Bush's plans to prevent future terrorist attacks upon the United States. Bush gave a progress report on the global war on terrorism and detailed his plans to end terrorism and bring all terrorists to justice, either by legal prosecution or death.

The issues inside the United States were also addressed by Bush, including his plan to strengthening the U.S. economy after a recession. The speech was centered on foreign affairs and was well received by both Republicans and Democrats. He said, "In four short months, our nation has comforted the victims, begun to rebuild New York and the Pentagon, rallied a great coalition, captured, arrested, and rid the world of thousands of terrorists, destroyed Afghanistan's terrorist training camps, saved a people from starvation, and freed a country from brutal oppression." In that statement, Bush referred to how the United States deposed the Taliban from its rule over Afghanistan. He stated that the U.S. deposed the Emirate of Afghanistan, because the Islamic regime did not respect the human rights of Afghan citizens.

== Background ==
"State of the Union" addresses are mandated by Article II, Section 3 of the United States Constitution which states that the President of the United States of America must inform the U.S. Congress regarding issues of the state and specific recommendations for new programs and initiatives. Since 1790, State of the Union addresses have been given once a year. They were given originally as written reports, but are now given as verbal orations before a formal audience, with the U.S. president addressing joint sessions of the U.S. Congress at the U.S. Capitol building in Washington, D.C., with the U.S. Vice President and U.S. Speaker of the House of Representatives sitting on a podium behind the president.

As the U.S. president, Bush gave the 2002 State of the Union Address on January 29, 2002. He addressed a joint session of the 107th U.S. Congress and special guests, as well as the U.S. and the international community through the televised speech.

The 2002 State of the Union address was the first to be delivered by Bush after the September 11 attacks of 2001. The oration addressed the attacks on the U.S. and his plan of action, as well as his goals for the remainder of his term as President. In the address, Bush first introduced the term "axis of evil" in referring to the countries of Iran, Iraq, and North Korea, with the oration being primarily centered on foreign policy.

== Major themes ==
=== September 11 attacks ===
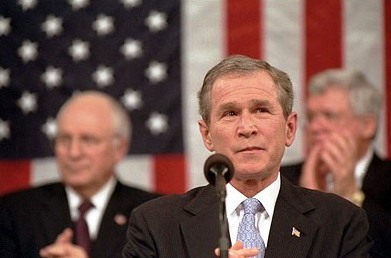
President George W. Bush during the speech, with Vice President Dick Cheney and House Speaker Dennis Hastert behind him

Bush spoke about the September 11 attacks four months prior that killed thousands of people in New York City, Virginia, and Pennsylvania. The Islamist terrorist organization al-Qaeda carried out the attack with 19 hijackers that took over four commercial airline flights and crashed them into the World Trade Center's Twin Towers in New York City's Lower Manhattan, and into the Pentagon in Virginia's Arlington County.

During the attack, two of the hijacked airplanes crashed into the upper portions of the twin towers of New York City's World Trade Center and one into the Pentagon. United Airlines Flight 93, which was also taken over by hijackers, failed to crash into its intended target in Washington, D.C. when passengers on the flight received information about the ongoing attacks and revolted against the terrorists, causing the plane to crash in an open field in the rural Pennsylvanian countryside.

=== "Axis of evil" ===
An "axis of evil" was a term first used by President Bush in this address. The so-called "axis of evil" was said to be made up of three countries: Iran, Iraq, and North Korea. These countries were cited as countries pursuing chemical, biological, and nuclear weapons and having terrorist training camps. The president warned, "States like these, and their terrorist allies, constitute an axis of evil, arming to threaten the peace of the world". Bush's stated goal was to disarm these countries and destroy their terrorist training camps.

=== Global war on terrorism and war in Afghanistan ===
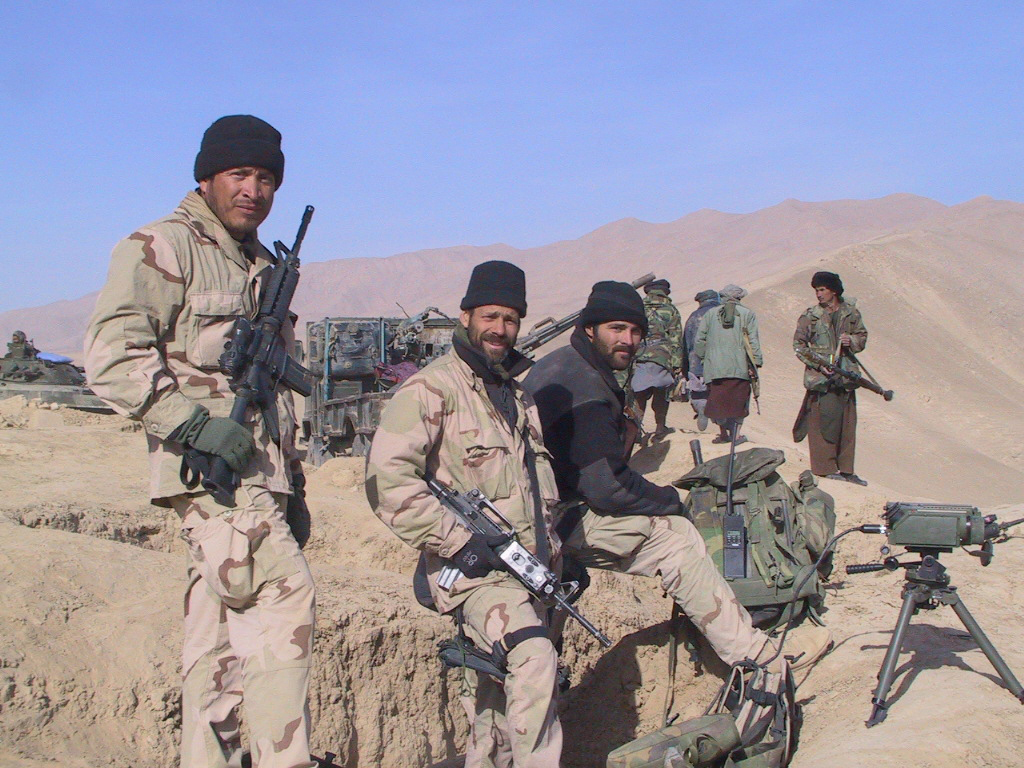
U.S. Army Special Forces sergeant Mario Vigil in November 2001, with American and Northern Alliance forces west of Konduz, Afghanistan.

Bush declared a "global war on terrorism", saying that the U.S. would act against any country that was aiding or harboring terrorists. His goals for the war were to end terrorism and its threat on the United States and to bring all terrorists to justice, either by capturing them and prosecuting them legally, or by killing them. In the months before the speech, Bush claimed that the U.S. military freed Afghanistan and was the country's allies against terrorism. The women in Afghanistan were freed and part of the new government and rebuilding of their country. The President felt the war in Afghanistan was just the beginning of the war against terror. He said, "Thousands of dangerous killers, schooled in the methods of murder, often supported by outlaw regimes, are now spread throughout the world like ticking time bombs, set to go off without warning." The two main goals of the war were to shut down training camps and capture terrorists and prevent terrorists from obtaining weapons of mass destruction. The American troops were deployed on missions in the Philippines, Bosnia, and the coast of Africa. Bush called for increased funding for the war to get precision weapons, replace aircraft, and increase pay raise for soldiers. In 2002 there were 69 casualties in Afghanistan. By 2012 there have been 2,920 casualties in Afghanistan and 4,802 casualties in Iraq.

=== Homeland security ===
The September 11 attacks of 2001 increased Bush's desire for a larger allocation of funds for "homeland security" purposes, to protect the U.S. against further terrorist attacks. Bush stated, "The next priority of my budget is to do everything possible to protect our citizens and strengthen our nation against the ongoing threat of another attack."

The four areas of focus in homeland security were bio-terrorism, emergency response, airport and border security, and improved intelligence. Bush believed effective execution of homeland security would make the U.S. a stronger country. The funding went to developing defenses against biochemical weapons, better training for police and emergency personnel, and stronger security at borders and airports. The President wanted to prevent another attack from happening and be more prepared if one occurred. The legislation establishing the Department of Homeland Security was passed by Congress and signed into law by the President in November 2002. The Homeland Security Act of 2002 brought together 22 separate agencies with the mission to prevent terrorism, reduce vulnerability to terrorism, and minimize the damage of a terrorist attack on the United States.

=== Economics ===
The U.S. economy went through a recession in 2001 for the first time in a decade. A reporter at CNN wrote, "The most common definition of a recession is two or more quarters of a shrinking economy." The factors defining a recession include declines in employment, industrial production, and income and sales. The unemployment rate jumped to 4.9%, which was the highest rate in the past four years. Experts at NBER, the National Bureau of Economic Research, argue that the economy likely could have avoided the recession if not for the September 11 attacks. The attacks shut down the economy for several days and had a lasting impact on tourism and other businesses. The President was aware of the economic problems entering office and in the speech addressed methods of reviving the economy. The president summed up his plan when he said, "When America works, America prospers, so my economic security plan can be summed up in one word: jobs." President Bush's plan addressed the importance of education, affordable energy, expanded trade, and sound economic and fiscal policy to create "good jobs" for the American people. Bush argued that the most effective means of creating jobs was by investing in factories and equipment and speeding up tax relief. He pushed for a stimulus package to be passed by Congress to aid in relief.

== Statistics ==
The address marked Bush's second formal speech of his administration. Certain words appeared much more frequently than others. The words "Afghanistan" and "war" were each spoken 13 times in the speech, and the word "terrorist" was used 19 times. The word "economy" was spoken 7 different times and Iraq was mentioned twice. One of the most frequently used words in his speech was "terror". The speech lasted 48 minutes and applause broke out 76 different times. At the time of the speech, President Bush had an 80% approval rating.

== Democratic response ==
Representative Richard Dick Gephardt (D-MO), the Minority Leader of the House of Representatives at the time, gave the Democratic response to President Bush's 2002 State of the Union address. In his response, the Congressman from Missouri argued the importance of unity among the parties during the difficult times the country was facing. He asserted the Democratic and Republican parties needed to come together to figure out how to win the war on terror and help the economy out of recession.

== Special guests ==
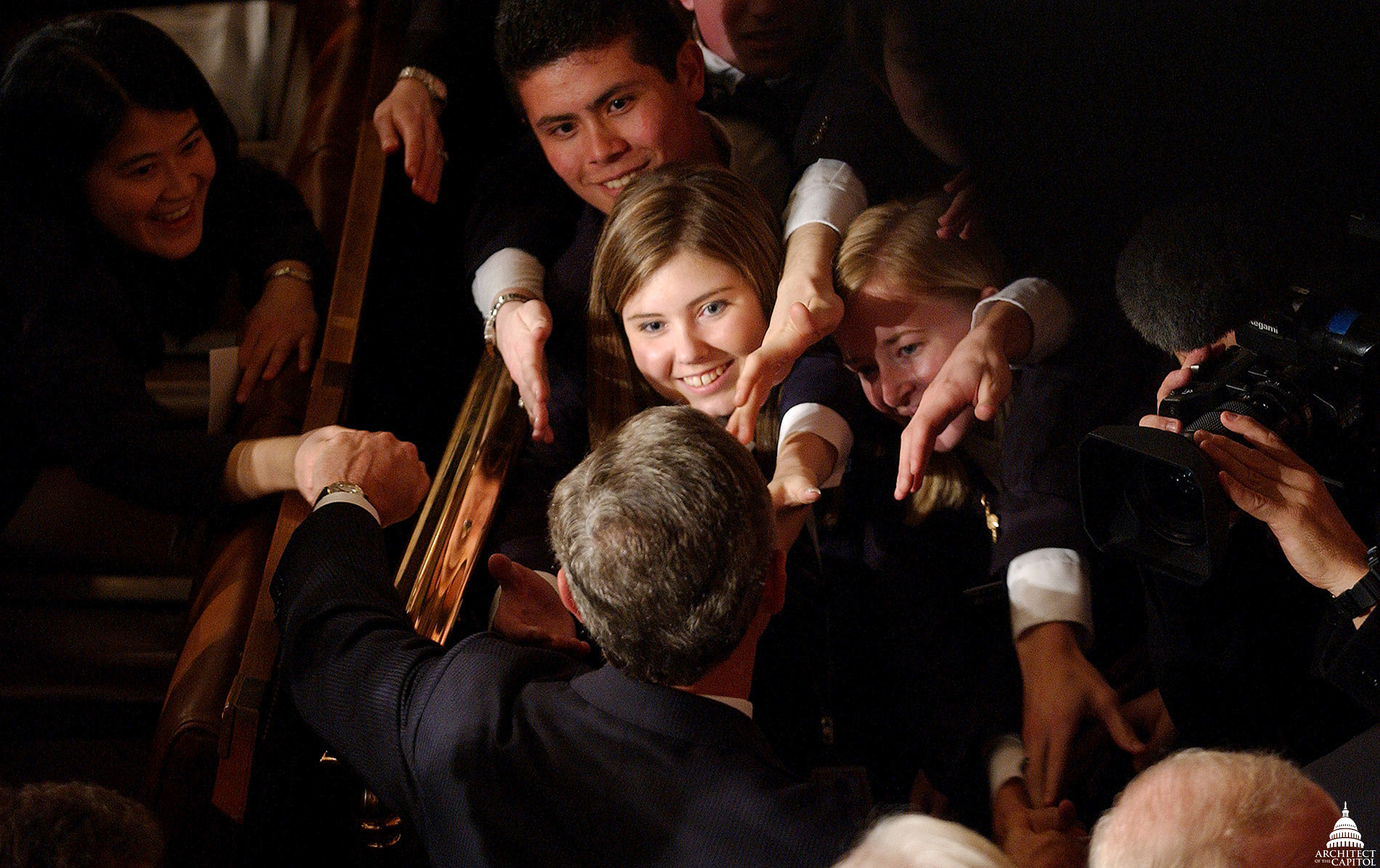
President Bush speaking with guests

The State of the Union addresses are always a joint session of Congress, but there were other people invited to the President's speech. The first guest mentioned was the interim leader of Afghanistan, Afghan Interim Authority Chairman Hamid Karzai. Another Afghan leader present was Dr. Sima Samar the Minister of Woman's Affairs. Also a guest was Afghan Interim Authority Foreign Minister Dr. Abdullah Abdullah. Shannon Spann, the wife of CIA officer and Marine Michael Spann, was present and her story mentioned in the president's speech. Flight attendants Hermis Moutardier and Christina Jones were present and commended by the president. There were twenty other citizens invited to the speech on the First Lady's guest list.

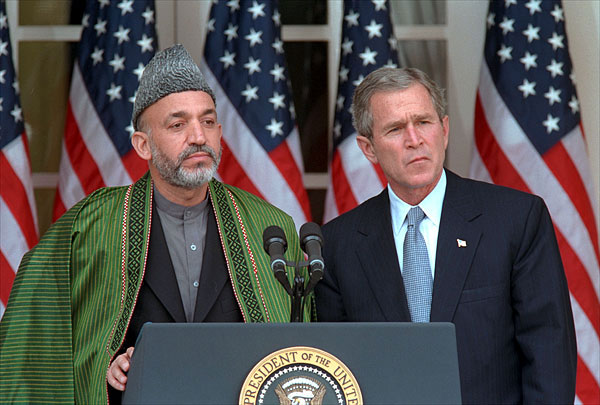
Hamid Karzai and George W. Bush addressing reporters at the White House in January 2002, before the State of the Union address.

Guest List

- Chairman Hamid Karzai
- Dr. Sima Samar
- Dr. Abdullah
- Ms. Christina Jones
- Ms. Hermis Moutardier
- Mr. Conrad Rodriguez
- Ms. Sarah Sandoval
- Mrs. Sadoozai Panah
- Mrs. Shannon Spann
- Mr. James Hoffa
- Mr. W. Mitt Romney
- Mr. James Edmund Shea
- Mr. William Best
- Mr. Daniel Cabrera
- Mrs. Jenna Welch
- Mrs. Jan O'Neill
- Mr. Joe O'Neill
- Mrs. Renae Chapman
- Sergeant First Class Ronnie Raikes
- Sergeant First Class Michael S. McElhiney
- Specialist Angela M. Ortega
- Mayor Anthony Williams
- Bishop Wilton Gregory
- Mrs. Rhoda Reeves

== See also ==
- 2002 United States House of Representatives elections

Preceded by 2001 joint session speech	State of the Union addresses 2002	Succeeded by 2003 State of the Union Address
