= 2000 State of the Union Address =

Speech by US President Bill Clinton

- Full video of the speech as published by the White House
- Date: January 27, 2000
- Time: 9:00 p.m. EST
- Duration: 1 hour, 28 minutes, 49 seconds
- Venue: House Chamber, United States Capitol
- Location: Washington, D.C.; 38°53′19.8″N 77°00′32.8″W
- Type: State of the Union Address
- Participants: Bill Clinton; Al Gore; Dennis Hastert
- Previous: 1999 State of the Union Address
- Next: 2001 Joint session speech

Bill Clinton, the 42nd president of the United States, delivered a State of the Union address on January 27, 2000, at 9:00 p.m. EST, in the chamber of the United States House of Representatives. It was Clinton's seventh and final State of the Union Address and his eighth and final speech to a joint session of the United States Congress. Presiding over this joint session was the House speaker, Dennis Hastert, accompanied by Al Gore, the vice president, in his capacity as the president of the Senate.

Clinton began the speech by saying, "We are fortunate to be alive at this moment in history. Never before has our nation enjoyed, at once, so much prosperity and social progress with so little internal crisis or so few external threats. Never before have we had such a blessed opportunity and, therefore, such a profound obligation to build the more perfect union of our founders' dreams." Clinton discussed many topics in the address, including education, health care, crime, the global economy, technology, and the environment.

At the time, it was the longest State of the Union address in recorded history at 1 hour, 28 minutes, and 49 seconds until it was surpassed by the 2026 State of the Union Address by Donald Trump that lasted 1 hour, 47 minutes, and 40 seconds.

This State of the Union address is notable for being the first since President Reagan's 1986 address at which all 9 members of the Supreme Court were absent. It is speculated that their absence was due to Clinton's recent impeachment. Bill Richardson, the Secretary of Energy, served as the designated survivor.

== See also ==
- 2000 United States presidential election

Preceded by 1999 State of the Union Address	State of the Union addresses 2000	Succeeded by 2001 joint session speech
