= Civilian Reserve Corps =

The creation of a Civilian Reserve Corps was called for in both the 2006 National Security Strategy and in the 2007 State of the Union Address. According to the State of the Union Address, "It would give people across America who do not wear the uniform a chance to serve in the defining struggle of our time."

In a twist of the usual State Department-Pentagon rivalry, Defense Secretary Robert M. Gates has become the program's most outspoken advocate. "The Department of Defense has taken on many ... burdens that might have been assumed by civilian agencies in the past... [The military has] done an admirable job ... but it is no replacement for the real thing – civilian involvement and expertise... Funding for non-military foreign-affairs programs... remains disproportionately small relative to what we spend on the military... Secretary Rice has asked for a budget increase for the State Department and an expansion of the Foreign Service. The need is real... What is clear to me is that there is a need for a dramatic increase in spending on the civilian instruments of national security – diplomacy, strategic communications, foreign assistance, civic action, and economic reconstruction and development... Indeed, having robust civilian capabilities available could make it less likely that military force will have to be used in the first place, as local problems might be dealt with before they become crises."

== See also ==
- Americorps
- Peace Corps
