= 1999 State of the Union Address =

Speech by US President Bill Clinton

- Full video of the speech as published by the White House
- Date: January 19, 1999
- Time: 9:00 p.m. EST
- Duration: 1 hour, 18 minutes
- Venue: House Chamber, United States Capitol
- Location: Washington, D.C.; 38°53′23″N 77°00′32″W
- Type: State of the Union Address
- Participants: Bill Clinton; Al Gore; Dennis Hastert
- Previous: 1998 State of the Union Address
- Next: 2000 State of the Union Address

Bill Clinton, 42nd president of the United States, delivered a State of the Union address on January 19, 1999, at 9:00 p.m. EST, in the chamber of the United States House of Representatives to the 106th United States Congress. It was Clinton's sixth State of the Union Address and his seventh speech to a joint session of the United States Congress. Presiding over this joint session was the House speaker, Dennis Hastert, accompanied by Al Gore, the vice president, in his capacity as the president of the Senate.

President Clinton discussed the economy, the federal budget, taxes and focused on the budget surplus, then at $70 billion. The president also discussed the future of Social Security, education, foreign relations and "solving the so-called Y2K computer problem". The president did not mention the then-occurring impeachment trial in the Senate.

The speech lasted 1:18:40 and consisted of 7,514 words. In the speech, the president acknowledged the widows of the officers killed in the United States Capitol shooting incident of 1998.

Before the speech, President Clinton shook hands with Speaker Hastert and Vice President Gore. Speaker Hastert introduced the president with the traditional words "I have the high privilege and the distinct honor of presenting to you the president of the United States". After the speech, Hastert and Gore shook hands with the president.

The Republican Party response was delivered by Representatives Jennifer Dunn and Steve Largent in Washington, D.C.

Andrew Cuomo, the Secretary of Housing and Urban Development, served as the designated survivor.

Preceded by 1998 State of the Union Address	State of the Union addresses 1999	Succeeded by 2000 State of the Union Address
