= Wesley Autrey =

Construction worker and US Navy veteran

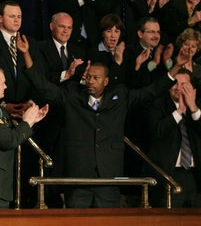
- Autrey at the 2007 State of the Union Address
- Born: February 6, 1956 (age 70)
- Other names: Subway Samaritan, Subway Superman, The Hero of Harlem, Subway Hero
- Occupation: New York City construction worker/Navy veteran

Wesley Autrey (born February 6, 1956), dubbed by the media as the Subway Samaritan, Subway Superman, Hero of Harlem, and Subway Hero, is a New York City construction worker and Navy veteran. In 2007, he achieved international recognition when he saved Cameron Hollopeter, a film student who suffered a seizure and fell onto the tracks, from being struck by a New York City Subway train. He is on the 2007 edition of Time Magazine's "Time 100" Most Influential People in the World list, with a tribute written by Donald Trump.

== Subway incident ==
On January 2, 2007, Autrey was waiting for a train at the 137th Street–City College station in Manhattan with his two young daughters. At around 12:45 p.m., he and two women noticed a young man, Cameron Hollopeter, having a seizure. Autrey borrowed a pen and used it to keep Hollopeter's jaw open. Following the seizure, Hollopeter stumbled from the platform, falling onto the tracks.

As Hollopeter lay on the tracks, Autrey saw the lights of an oncoming 1 train. As one of the women held Autrey's daughters away from the edge of the platform, he dove onto the tracks. He thought he would be able to take Hollopeter off the tracks, but he realized there was not enough time to drag Hollopeter away. Instead, he protected Hollopeter by throwing himself over Hollopeter's body in a drainage trench between the tracks, where he held him down. Though the operator of the train applied the brakes, all but two cars passed over them, close enough to leave grease on Autrey's cap.

== Immediate response and honors ==
Autrey told The New York Times "I don't feel like I did something spectacular; I just saw someone who needed help. I did what I felt was right." Wesley is a member of the LIUNA union, Local 79, and credits his training with helping him make the split-second decision: "Since I do construction work with Local 79, we work in confined spaces a lot. So I looked, and my judgment was pretty right. The train did have enough room for me."

Autrey went to Hollopeter's hospital room and met his family. Hollopeter's father Larry said:

Mr. Autrey's instinctive and unselfish act saved our son's life. There are no words to properly express our gratitude and feelings for his actions.... May God's blessings be with Mr. Autrey and his family.

=== Media attention ===
By the end of the next day, Autrey received a flood of gifts and phone calls of praise from complete strangers. He received $5,000 cash and $5,000 in scholarships for his daughters from Jerry Sherlock, the president of the New York Film Academy where Hollopeter attends school. Autrey also received $10,000 from Donald Trump. He was interviewed for several national morning news programs and was invited to be a television guest by David Letterman, Charlie Rose and Ellen DeGeneres, among others. Autrey, who had been wearing a periwinkle blue beanie with a Playboy Bunny logo, received a lifetime subscription to Playboy, a new beanie, and additional Playboy merchandise. He also earned the title "Hero of Harlem", and received a trip to Walt Disney World Resort. On the January 9, 2007 airing of The Ellen DeGeneres Show, he was presented with a $5,000 Gap gift card, tickets and backstage passes to the next Beyoncé concert in New York, season tickets to the New Jersey Nets, a signed jersey from Jason Kidd, a brand new Jeep Patriot, two years' of car insurance from Progressive, and a one-year free parking pass for use anywhere in NYC. His daughters were given new computers that will be updated every three years until they graduate from high school.

Autrey, a construction worker, was working on converting classrooms into a library at PS 380, John Wayne Elementary School, in Brooklyn. The New York Daily News' Michael Daly said that the school should be renamed after Autrey instead.

On May 21, 2007, Autrey, who claimed to make $1,200 a week in his construction job, appeared as a contestant on the NBC game show Deal or No Deal. He received offers up to $305,000, but after opening the million dollars in the last round, he went home with just $25 in his Case #7. As a token for his bravery, Chrysler donated a Jeep Patriot which was awarded to him (host Howie Mandel said it would have happened regardless of how Autrey fared in the game). The second Jeep Patriot Autrey had received, it was valued at $24,710.

=== Bronze medallion ceremony ===
On January 4, 2007, New York City Mayor Michael Bloomberg presented Autrey with the Bronze Medallion, New York City's highest award for exceptional citizenship and outstanding achievement, saying:

Wesley's astonishing bravery – saving a life in the face of an oncoming subway car – is an inspiration not just to New Yorkers, but the entire world. His courageous rescue of a complete stranger is a reminder of how we are surrounded by everyday heroes in New York City, and I am deeply honored to recognize one of them today.

New MTA executive director Elliott "Lee" Sander thanked him as well, saying:

By selflessly leaping to the aid of a fellow New Yorker and performing a type of heroic act nearly unrecallable to the memories of veteran transit workers, Wesley Autrey has captured the spirit of our city.

Sander presented Autrey with a year of free subway rides (in the form of 12 unlimited monthly MetroCards), plus various items of MTA merchandise for Autrey's young daughters. Also at the ceremony, Walt Disney World ambassador Lowell Doringo thanked Autrey and gave him and his family a week-long all-expenses-paid trip to Disney World, as well as tickets to see The Lion King on Broadway, and gave Mickey Mouse ears and Mickey and Minnie plush toys to his daughters.

=== State of the Union and CNN ceremony ===
On January 23, 2007, Autrey and his daughters were guests of President George W. Bush, seated in the balcony along with Dikembe Mutombo and others, at Bush's 2007 State of the Union Address to the United States Congress. Bush said of Autrey:

Three weeks ago, Wesley Autrey was waiting at a Harlem subway station with his two little girls, when he saw a man fall into the path of a train. With seconds to act, Wesley jumped onto the tracks, pulled the man into a space between the rails, and held him as the train passed right above their heads. He insists he's not a hero. Wesley says: "We got guys and girls overseas dying for us to have our freedoms. We got to show each other some love." There is something wonderful about a country that produces a brave and humble man like Wesley Autrey.

After Bush's remarks Autrey received a long standing ovation. Autrey proceeded to gesture outward to the crowd in thanks, shook the hands of First Lady Laura Bush, Second Lady Lynne Cheney, and embraced fellow honored guest Sgt. Tommy Rieman in a bear hug.

Rep. Joseph Crowley of Queens gave Bush credit for inviting Autrey and his daughters. Crowley commented on Bush's invitation to Autrey:

That's wonderful. Often times people have a misconception of New Yorkers, of their willingness to put themselves in harm's way, and he's a great example of a true New Yorker.

In December 2007, in a ceremony hosted by CNN to honor heroes who have made a difference in the world, Autrey received the "Everyday Hero" award.

== Aftermath ==
In late March 2007, Autrey sued a lawyer and his Hollywood agent, alleging they tricked him into signing a "one-sided" contract. The lawyer, Diane Kleiman, claimed that Autrey signed the contract willingly and was trying to get out of the contract because he wanted to work with someone else. According to the Associated Press, the contract between Autrey and Kleiman, which Autrey said he signed without reading, gave Kleiman exclusive rights to Autrey's name and ownership of his story, as well as 50% of Autrey's earnings. The lawsuit was settled later that year with the contract voided.

In 2009, Autrey was featured in the documentary Starsuckers, where he discussed his sudden fame.

In 2012, shortly after the fifth anniversary of his subway heroics, Autrey was featured on a CBS News story in New York City, which reported he was "a sought-after speaker" who still worked in construction and was raising his 9- and 11-year-old daughters. In July 2013 Autrey endorsed Mark D. Levine for City Council in his local New York City district.

Autrey retired in 2022. He made the news again in December 2022 for winning a Publishers Clearing House sweepstakes for a Ford Bronco Wildtrak vehicle worth over $52,000.

== In popular culture ==
- An episode of the television show 30 Rock entitled "Subway Hero" features Dennis Duffy, a recurring character, as a citywide hero after emulating the actions of Wesley Autrey.
- The January 2011 premiere of House MD, shows a man named Jack Nash who heroically saves a woman stuck in the throes of a seizure on the subway tracks. Nash, deemed by the press "The Subway Hero," collapses afterward from injuries unrelated to the train incident.
- Autrey was a contestant on the show Deal or No Deal.
