= Fourth Annual State of Indian Nations Address =

2006 speech

The Fourth Annual State of Indian Nations Address was delivered by National Congress of American Indians president Joe Garcia on February 2, 2006, at 12:00 p.m. (EST) at the National Press Club, two days after United States President George W. Bush gave his 2006 State of the Union address.
