= Federal Trade Commission Building =

Building in Washington, D.C.

- Apex Building
- U.S. Historic district – Contributing property
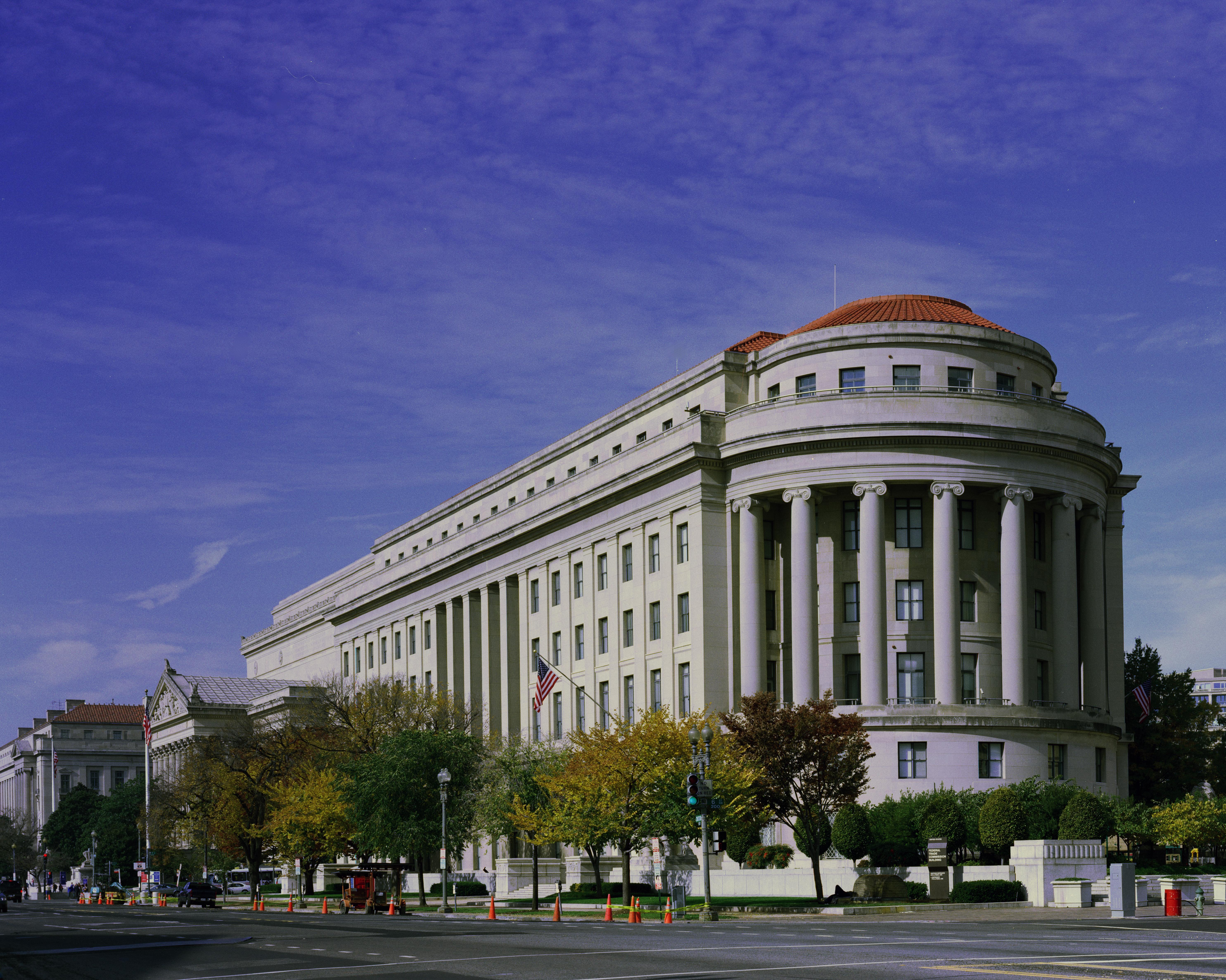
- Federal Trade Commission Building in 2005

- Location within Washington, D.C.
- Location: 600 Pennsylvania Avenue, and Constitution Avenue, NW; Washington, D.C.
- Coordinates: 38°53′33.3″N 77°1′16.1″W
- Built: 1938
- Architect: Edward H. Bennett,
- Architectural style: Classical Revival
- Part of: Pennsylvania Avenue National Historic Site (ID66000865)

The Federal Trade Commission Building, known historically as the Apex Building, is the Washington, D.C., headquarters of the Federal Trade Commission. Completed in 1938, the building was designated by Congress in 1966 as a contributing structure to the Pennsylvania Avenue National Historic Site, and was subsequently listed in the National Register of Historic Places.

== History ==
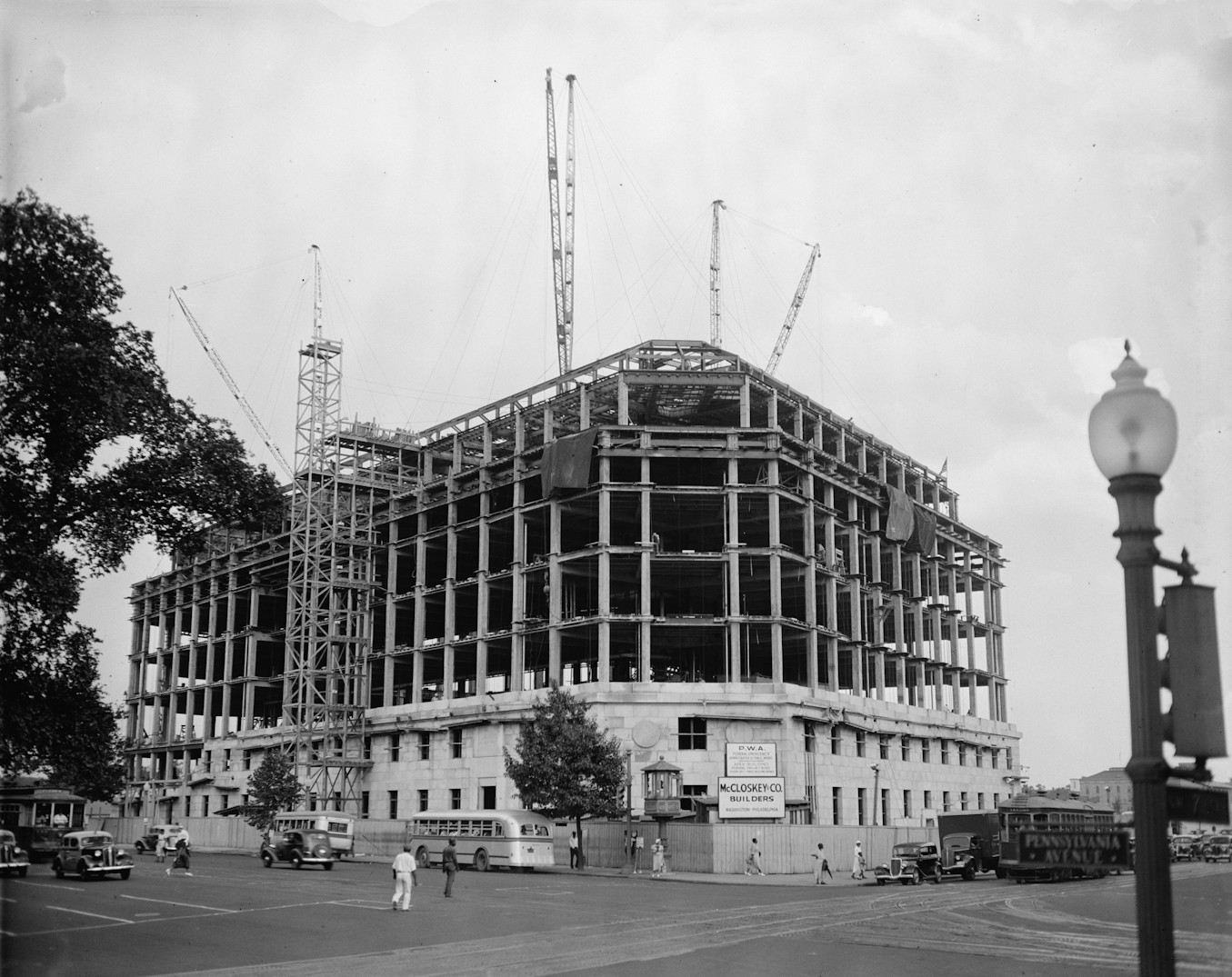
The Apex Building under construction in 1937

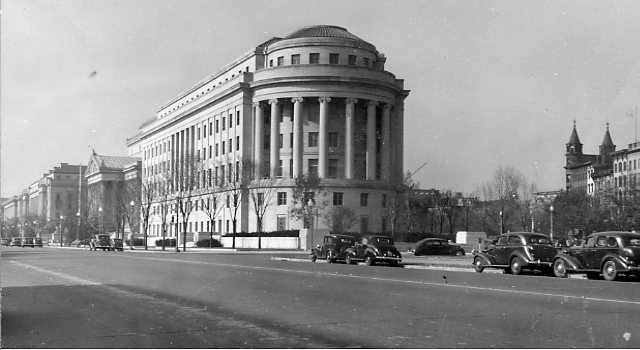
The Apex Building, c. 1945

Issues of antitrust legislation, tariff reduction, and tax reform dominated the 1912 presidential election, which culminated in the election of Woodrow Wilson as the twenty-eighth president of the United States. Honoring his campaign promises, Wilson signed the Federal Trade Commission Act in 1914. The following year, the Federal Trade Commission (FTC) absorbed the duties of the Bureau of Corporations in the United States Department of Commerce. The FTC conducted investigations, published reports, and scrutinized industries such as meatpacking. It could challenge unfair competition and practices in trade and commerce.

The FTC occupied various sites in Washington, D.C., during the agency's early years. The Public Buildings Act of 1926 authorized Congress to fund the Federal Triangle project, a large-scale initiative to develop a 70-acre site between the White House and the U.S. Capitol with federal buildings executed in classical styles of architecture. At the urging of the American Institute of Architects, the U.S. Treasury Department turned over principal design responsibilities to private architects. Edward H. Bennett of the Chicago firm Bennett, Parsons and Frost oversaw the project and designed the final building, which would become the headquarters for the FTC.

In 1937, President Franklin Delano Roosevelt laid the building cornerstone with the silver trowel that George Washington used to lay the cornerstone of the U.S. Capitol in 1793. In his speech, Roosevelt expressed hope that the "permanent home of the Federal Trade Commission stand for all time as a symbol of the purpose of the government to insist on a greater application of the golden rule to the conduct of corporation and business and enterprises in their relationship to the body politic."

Located at the eastern point of the Federal Triangle, it was originally called the Apex Building. Staff moved into the building on April 21, 1938. Over the years, the FTC's responsibilities expanded to include the enforcement of credit laws, oversight of the National Do Not Call Registry, and the development of policies concerning Internet fraud and privacy.

Loyalty Board reviews occurred in the Apex Building in 1948 concurrently with the first month of the Hiss-Chambers Case, as reported by the New York Times.

== Architecture ==
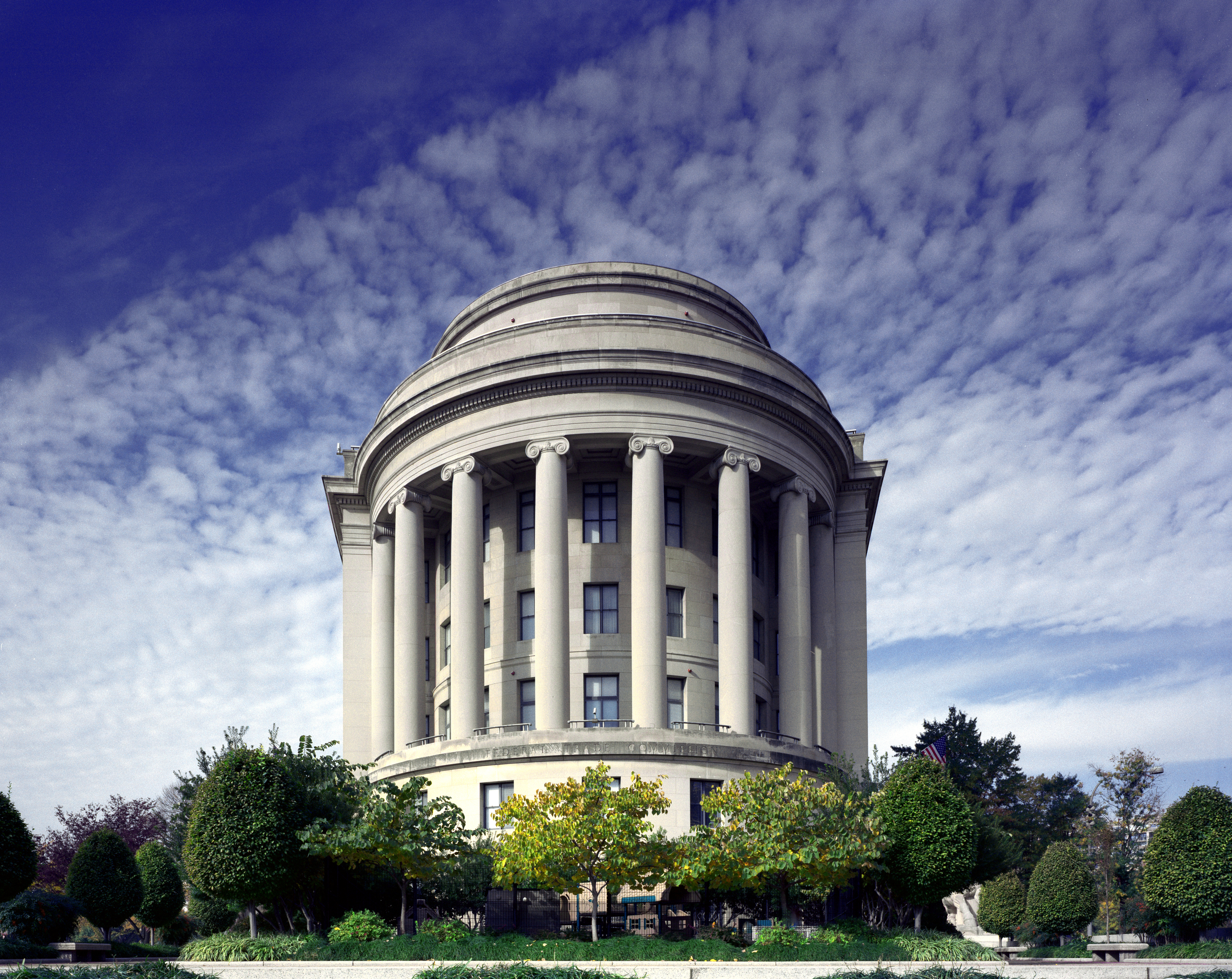
The Apex Building is built in the Classical Revival style

The Federal Trade Commission Building is designed in the Classical Revival style of architecture. It is a refined style that conveys the dignity and stability of the federal government, which was particularly important during the Great Depression. The buildings within the Federal Triangle were designed according to principles of the City Beautiful movement, which espoused the use of formal arrangements, axial streets, and monumental, classical public buildings in city planning. Earlier in his career, the FTC Building's architect, Edward H. Bennett, was an assistant to prominent architect and planner Daniel H. Burnham, a pioneer in city planning responsible for the layout of the 1893 World's Columbian Exposition in Chicago, as well as designs for Chicago and San Francisco. Burnham's influence is evident in Bennett's work on the FTC Building.

Bennett's design emphasizes the relationship between the building and its site. It is located on a triangular parcel of land bounded by Pennsylvania and Constitution avenues and Seventh Street, NW; the building has an essentially triangular footprint with a semicircular portico at one end. An interior courtyard provides natural light to interior offices. The building has undergone few changes since its construction.

The seven-story building sits on a simple base of Mount Airy granite. The walls above are clad in large, smooth blocks of Indiana limestone laid in a regular pattern. Bays on the midsection of each elevation are divided by pilasters (attached columns) or colonnades that form a loggia (open-air, arcaded space). The seventh story is slightly recessed. The portico is supported by Ionic columns. Aluminum window and door grilles accent the exterior. The low hipped roof is covered with red terra-cotta tiles.

The interior spaces are relatively restrained; only public spaces and hearing rooms are afforded a measure of distinction. Three lobbies on the first floor share similar features. Floors are covered with large, dark green terrazzo panels with black borders. Walls are clad in Neshobe gray marble with black marble on fluted pilasters, and plaster covers the ceiling and cornice. The FTC Building was one of the first federal buildings in Washington to have an integral air-conditioning system and a basement parking garage.

Man Controlling Trade by Michael Lantz

As part of the building plan, the Section of Painting and Sculpture oversaw the design and installation of several significant works of art. Two bas-relief medallions with eagles are located on the northwest corner elevation. Officials requested that the artist, Sidney Waugh, develop a fresh interpretation on the symbol, and the resulting design is highly stylized, relating well to the building's other modern works. Large aluminum entrance grilles function as doors on the Constitution Avenue elevation. Images on the grilles, which were designed by William McVey, portray a continuum of commerce-related transportation methods. Depictions include Christopher Columbus's 14th-century ships, an 18th-century merchant ship, 19th-century clipper ship, paddlewheel steamship, early 20th-century ocean liner, and seaplane. Above the grilles are rectangular panels, each executed by a different artist, that represent foreign trade, agriculture, shipping, and industry.

Two related allegorical sculptural groups called Man Controlling Trade are located at the east ends of the two avenue elevations. Michael Lantz designed the sculptures in the Art Deco style. In each, a muscular man holds a straining workhorse, symbolizing the enormity and power of trade and the government in its role as regulator. The sculptures have become the agency's informal logo.

== Significant events ==
- 1914: Federal Trade Commission established
- 1926: Public Buildings Act of 1926
- 1937: President Franklin Delano Roosevelt lays cornerstone
- 1938: Construction completed and building occupied
- 1966: Designated a contributing building within the Pennsylvania Avenue National Historic Site and listed in the National Register of Historic Places

== Building facts ==
- Location: 600 Pennsylvania Ave., NW
- Architects: Bennett, Parsons and Frost
- Construction Dates: 1937-1938
- Architectural Style: Classical Revival
- Landmark Status: Contributing building to the Pennsylvania Avenue National Historic Site
- Primary Materials: Granite and Limestone
- Prominent Features: Part of Federal Triangle development initiative; Colonnade; Man Controlling Trade sculptures
