= Man Controlling Trade =

Artwork by Michael Lantz

Coordinates: 38.8919°N 77.0189°W

Constitution Avenue side

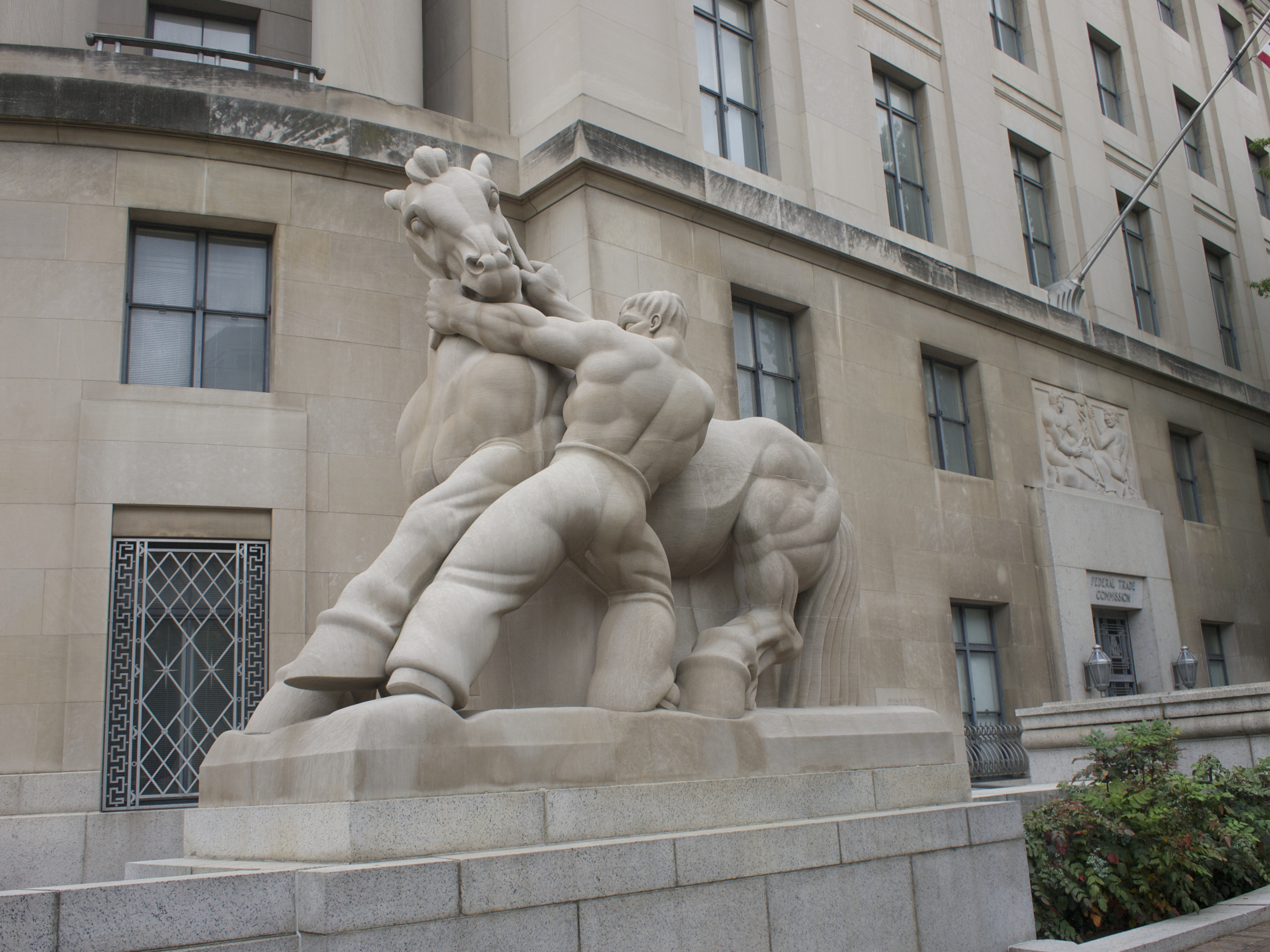
Pennsylvania Avenue side

Man Controlling Trade is the name given to two monumental equestrian statues created by Michael Lantz for the Federal Trade Commission Building in Washington, D.C., and dedicated in 1942.

In July 1937 the United States Department of the Treasury Section of Painting and Sculpture announced an open competition to design and execute two large sculptures for the Federal Trade Commission Building. The competition attracted over 500 models from 234 sculptors, Each of the asymmetric limestone groups is approximately 12 feet tall and 16 feet long.

== See also ==
- 1942 in art
- List of New Deal sculpture
- List of public art in Washington, D.C., Ward 6
