= 2001 George W. Bush speech to a joint session of Congress =

Speech by US President George W. Bush

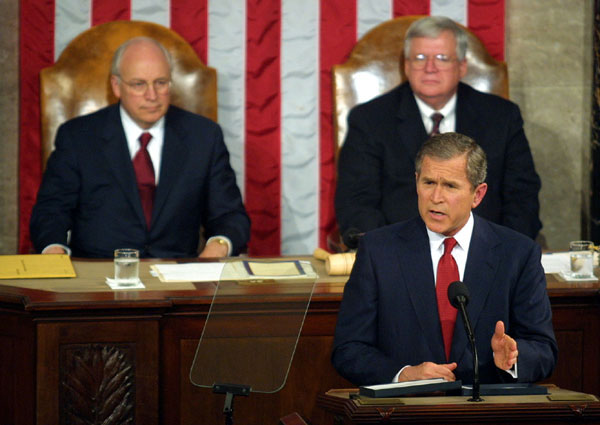
- President George W. Bush during the speech, with Vice President Dick Cheney and House Speaker Dennis Hastert behind him
- Date: February 27, 2001
- Time: 9:00 p.m. EST
- Duration: 51 minutes
- Venue: House Chamber, United States Capitol
- Location: Washington, D.C.; 38°53′23″N 77°00′32″W
- Type: Unofficial State of the Union Address
- Participants: George W. Bush; Dick Cheney; Dennis Hastert
- Previous: 2000 State of the Union Address
- Next: 2002 State of the Union Address

George W. Bush, the 43rd president of the United States, addressed a joint session of the United States Congress on Tuesday, February 27, 2001. It was his first public address before a joint session. Like a State of the Union Address, it was delivered before the 107th United States Congress in the Chamber of the United States House of Representatives in the United States Capitol. Presiding over this joint session was the House speaker, Dennis Hastert, accompanied by Dick Cheney, the vice president in his capacity as the president of the Senate.

The speech was called the Presidential Economic Address. During his speech, President Bush discussed his budgetary and economic goals. He offered a plan that would have a $1.6 trillion tax cut and a payment of $2 trillion of the national debt over the next 10 years, leaving a portion of the projected surplus for emergency measures. He also talked about education policy, Social Security, and his philosophy of limited government.

Secretary of Veterans Affairs Anthony Principi was the designated survivor and did not attend the address in order to maintain a continuity of government. He was sequestered at a secret secure location for the duration of the event.

== Democratic response ==
Senate Minority Leader Tom Daschle of South Dakota and House Minority Leader Richard Gephardt of Missouri delivered the Democratic response to the address.

== See also ==
- First 100 days of the George W. Bush presidency
- List of joint sessions of the United States Congress

| Preceded by 2000 State of the Union Address | State of the Union addresses 2001 joint session speech | Succeeded by 2002 State of the Union Address |
