= National Special Security Event =

Event with significant risk of terrorism or criminal activity

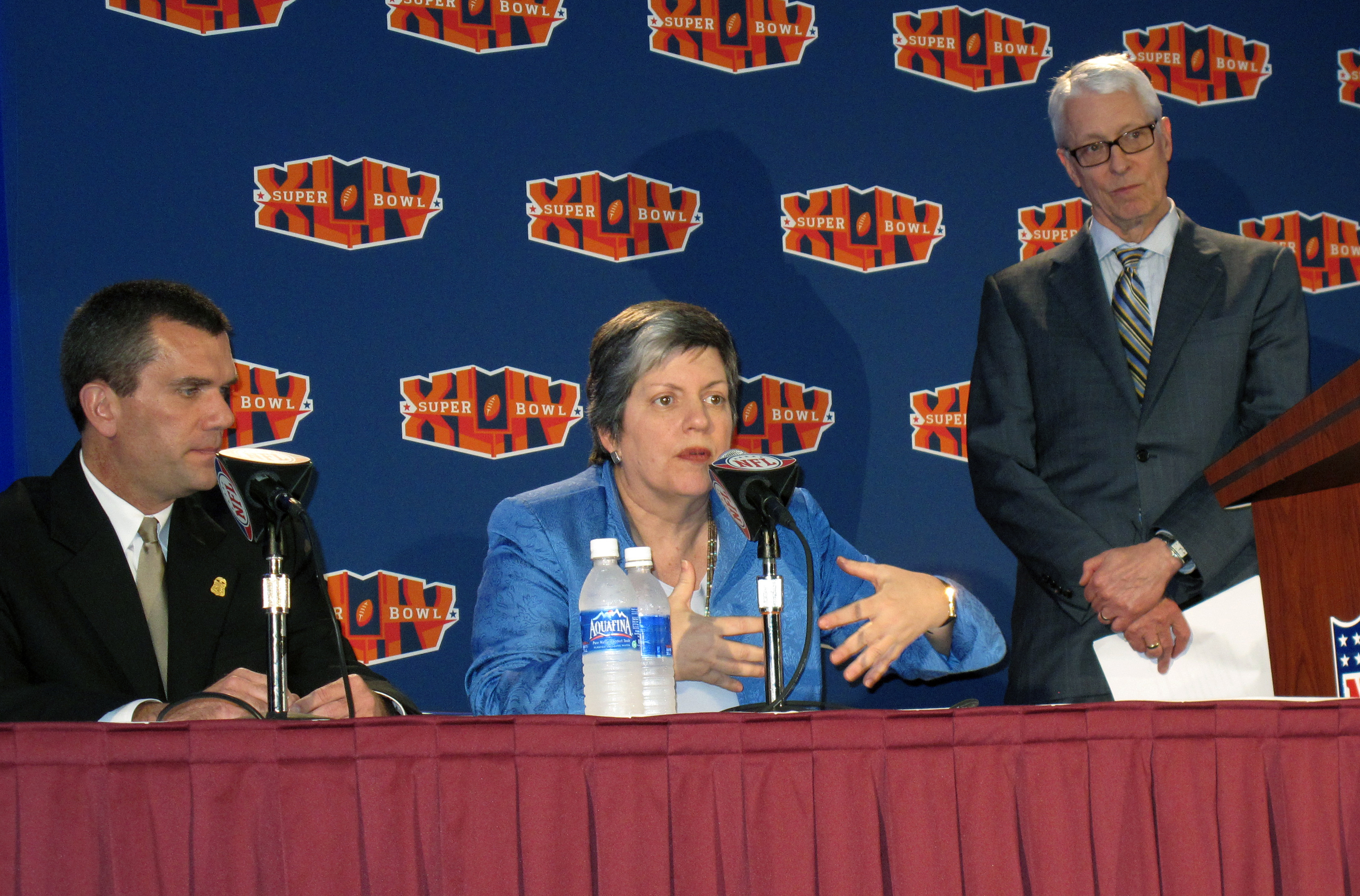
Secretary of Homeland Security Janet Napolitano (center) at a security news conference for Super Bowl XLIV, on February 1, 2010

A National Special Security Event (NSSE) is a classification of event which is deemed of national or international significance by the United States Department of Homeland Security (DHS) to be a potential target for terrorism or other criminal activity. These events have included summits of world leaders, meetings of international organizations, presidential nominating conventions and presidential inaugurations. NSSE designation requires federal agencies to provide full cooperation and support to ensure the safety and security of those participating in or otherwise attending the event, and the community within which the event takes place, and is typically limited to specific event sites for a specified time frame.

An NSSE places the United States Secret Service as the lead agency in charge of the planning, coordination, and implementation of security operations for the event, the Federal Bureau of Investigation (FBI) in charge of intelligence, counterterrorism, and investigation of major criminal activities associated with the event, and the Federal Emergency Management Agency (FEMA) in charge of recovery management in the aftermath of terrorism, major criminal activities, natural disasters, or other catastrophic incidents following the event. Like the FBI and FEMA, the Secret Service brings in local law enforcement, public safety, and military experts to assist with developing the plan, and give them the special guidance and training to operate within the security plan. NSSE designation is not a funding mechanism, and currently there is no specific federal "pot of money" to be distributed to state and local governments within whose jurisdiction NSSEs take place.

== Authority ==
NSSE procedures were established by President Bill Clinton in a portion of Presidential Decision Directive 62 in May 1998, which set out the security roles for federal agencies at major events. The Presidential Threat Protection Act of 2000 (Pub. L. 106–544 (text) (PDF), signed into law on December 19, 2000) added special events explicitly to the powers of the United States Secret Service in 18 U.S.C. § 3056.

== Procedure ==
A number of factors are taken into consideration when designating an event as a National Special Security Event. Department of Homeland Security press releases usually cite the following factors:

- Anticipated attendance by dignitaries. Events attended by officials of the United States government or foreign dignitaries may create an independent federal interest to ensure that the event transpires without incident and that sufficient resources are brought to bear in the event of an incident.
- Size of the event. A large number of attendees and participants generally increases security requirements. In addition, larger events are more likely to draw the attention of terrorists or other criminals, particularly those interested in employing weapons of mass destruction.
- Significance of the event. Some events have historical, political, cultural, or other symbolic significance that may heighten concern about possible terrorist acts or other criminal activity.
- Duration of the event. State and local law enforcement and public safety agencies may possess the manpower and other resources to provide adequate security for a major event within their jurisdiction (e.g. World Series, NASCAR race, Super Bowl, televised awards show), but unable to do so for events over several days or weeks and at the same time continue to meet routine obligations in the greater community.
- Availability of state and local resources. When state and local jurisdictions lack the expertise, experience, manpower or other assets needed to ensure comprehensive protection of these major events of national or international significance.
- Multiplicity of Jurisdictions. Extensive coordination of law enforcement and public safety agencies from multiple jurisdictions.
- Threat assessments. Anticipation of terrorism, or extensive illegal civil disobedience or other criminal activity.

Typical NSSE security measures include:

- Interagency coordination and interoperability
- Heavy police (days off and leaves may be canceled) and often National Guard presence
- Police dogs for bomb detection
- Surveillance
- WMD detection, mitigation, and decontamination
- Sharpshooters and other tactical capabilities
- Flight restrictions around the area
- United States Coast Guard patrols
- Increased railroad security
- Extensive road closures
- When applicable members of Joint Task Force - Civil Support and the Chemical Biological Incident Response Force (CBIRF) are deployed

The Secret Service notes that since the "Presidential Protection Act of 2000 became public law...the Secret Service is authorized to participate in the planning, coordination and implementation of security operations at special events of national significance....[and that] when an event is designated by the Secretary of Homeland Security as a National Special Security Event (NSSE), the Secret Service assumes its mandated role as the lead agency for the design and implementation of the operational security plan...The goal of the cooperating agencies is to provide a safe and secure environment for Secret Service protectees, other dignitaries, the event participants and the general public. There is a tremendous amount of advance planning and coordination in preparation for these events."

== Events ==
18 U.S.C. § 3056 paragraph (e)(2) requires that, at the end of each federal fiscal year, the executive branch report to Congress which events were designated NSSEs, and what criteria were used to make the designations.

Typical types of NSSEs are state funerals, major political conventions, and the State of the Union addresses. The table below lists some NSSEs since enactment of the relevant statute.

Date	Event	Location	State(s) or district	Notes
September 13–17, 1998	World Energy Council Meeting	George R. Brown Convention Center, Houston, Texas	Texas	
April 23–25, 1999	NATO 50th Anniversary Celebration	Andrew W. Mellon Auditorium, Washington, D.C.	DC	
November 29 – December 3, 1999	World Trade Organization Ministerial Conference of 1999	Washington State Convention and Trade Center, Seattle, Washington	Washington	
January 27, 2000	2000 State of the Union Address	United States Capitol, Washington, D.C.	DC	
April 14–17, 2000	International Monetary Fund Spring Meeting	Washington, D.C.	DC	
July 3–9, 2000	Operation Sail Summer Millennium Celebration	New York Harbor, New York City, New York	New York	
July 29 – August 9, 2000	2000 Republican National Convention	First Union Center, Philadelphia, Pennsylvania	Pennsylvania	
August 14–16, 2000	2000 Democratic National Convention	Staples Center, Los Angeles, California	California	
January 20, 2001	First inauguration of George W. Bush	United States Capitol, Washington, D.C.	DC	
February 27, 2001	2001 Presidential Address to Congress	United States Capitol, Washington, D.C.	DC	
November 10–16, 2001	United Nations General Assembly 56th session	United Nations Headquarters, New York City, New York	New York	
January 29, 2002	2002 State of the Union Address	United States Capitol, Washington, D.C.	DC	
January 31 – February 4, 2002	World Economic Forum USA Meeting	Waldorf Astoria New York, New York City, New York	New York	
February 3, 2002	Super Bowl XXXVI	Louisiana Superdome, New Orleans, Louisiana	Louisiana	First Super Bowl since the September 11 attacks; former President George H. W. Bush also performed the coin toss
February 8–24, 2002	2002 Winter Olympics	Salt Lake City, Utah	Utah	
January 20, 2003	2003 State of the Union Address	United States Capitol, Washington, D.C.	DC	
January 20, 2004	2004 State of the Union Address	United States Capitol, Washington, D.C.	DC	
June 8–10, 2004	30th G8 summit	Sea Island, Georgia	Georgia	
June 9–11, 2004	State funeral of Ronald Reagan	Washington, D.C. Simi Valley, California	DC; California	
July 26–29, 2004	2004 Democratic National Convention	FleetCenter, Boston, Massachusetts	Massachusetts	
August 30 – September 2, 2004	2004 Republican National Convention	Madison Square Garden, New York City, New York	New York	
January 20, 2005	Second inauguration of George W. Bush	United States Capitol, Washington, D.C.	DC	
February 2, 2005	2005 State of the Union Address	United States Capitol, Washington, D.C.	DC	
January 31, 2006	2006 State of the Union Address	United States Capitol, Washington, D.C.	DC	
December 30, 2006 – January 3, 2007	State funeral of Gerald Ford	Washington, D.C. Grand Rapids, Michigan	DC; Michigan	
January 23, 2007	2007 State of the Union Address	United States Capitol, Washington, D.C.	DC	
January 28, 2008	2008 State of the Union Address	United States Capitol, Washington, D.C.	DC	
August 25–28, 2008	2008 Democratic National Convention	Pepsi Center and Invesco Field at Mile High, Denver, Colorado	Colorado	26th NSSE
September 1–4, 2008	2008 Republican National Convention	Xcel Energy Center, Saint Paul, Minnesota	Minnesota	27th NSSE
September 23–29, 2008	United Nations General Assembly 63rd Session	United Nations Headquarters, New York City, New York	New York	
November 14–15, 2008	2008 G20 Washington summit	National Building Museum, Washington, D.C.	DC	
January 17, 2009	Pre-Inaugural Whistle Stop Tour	Philadelphia, Pennsylvania to Washington, D.C.	Pennsylvania; Delaware; Maryland; DC	Part of inaugural ceremonies
January 18, 2009	We Are One: The Obama Inaugural Celebration at the Lincoln Memorial	Lincoln Memorial and National Mall, Washington, D.C.	DC	
January 20, 2009	First inauguration of Barack Obama	United States Capitol, Washington, D.C.	DC	
February 24, 2009	2009 Presidential Address to Congress	United States Capitol, Washington, D.C.	DC	
September 23–29, 2009	United Nations General Assembly 64th Session	United Nations Headquarters, New York City, New York	New York	
September 24–25, 2009	2009 G20 Pittsburgh summit	David L. Lawrence Convention Center, Pittsburgh, Pennsylvania	Pennsylvania	
January 27, 2010	2010 State of the Union Address	United States Capitol, Washington, D.C.	DC	
April 12–13, 2010	2010 Nuclear Security Summit	Walter E. Washington Convention Center, Washington, D.C.	DC	
September 23–29, 2010	United Nations General Assembly 65th Session	United Nations Headquarters, New York City, New York	New York	
January 25, 2011	2011 State of the Union Address	United States Capitol, Washington, D.C.	DC	
September 21–27, 2011	United Nations General Assembly 66th Session	United Nations Headquarters, New York City, New York	New York	
November 12–13, 2011	2011 Asia-Pacific Economic Cooperation Summit	Hawaii Convention Center, Honolulu, Hawaii	Hawaii	
January 24, 2012	2012 State of the Union Address	United States Capitol, Washington, D.C.	DC	
May 18–19, 2012	38th G8 summit	Camp David, Maryland	Maryland	
May 20–21, 2012	2012 NATO Chicago Summit	McCormick Place, Chicago, Illinois	Illinois	
August 27–31, 2012	2012 Republican National Convention	Tampa Bay Times Forum, Tampa, Florida	Florida	
September 3–6, 2012	2012 Democratic National Convention	Time Warner Cable Arena, Charlotte, North Carolina	North Carolina	
September 25 – October 1, 2012	United Nations General Assembly 67th Session	United Nations Headquarters, New York City, New York	New York	
January 20, 2013	Second inauguration of Barack Obama	United States Capitol, Washington, D.C.	DC	
February 12, 2013	2013 State of the Union Address	United States Capitol, Washington, D.C.	DC	
September 24 – October 4, 2013	United Nations General Assembly 68th Session	United Nations Headquarters, New York City, New York	New York	
January 28, 2014	2014 State of the Union Address	United States Capitol, Washington, D.C.	DC	
September 24 – October 1, 2014	United Nations General Assembly 69th Session	United Nations Headquarters, New York City, New York	New York	
January 20, 2015	2015 State of the Union Address	United States Capitol, Washington, D.C.	DC	
September 22–27, 2015	Pope Francis's 2015 visit to the United States	Washington, D.C. New York City, New York; Philadelphia, Pennsylvania	DC; New York; Pennsylvania	
September 28 – October 3, 2015	United Nations General Assembly 70th Session	United Nations Headquarters, New York City, New York	New York	
January 12, 2016	2016 State of the Union Address	United States Capitol, Washington, D.C.	DC	
July 18–21, 2016	2016 Republican National Convention	Quicken Loans Arena, Cleveland, Ohio	Ohio	
July 25–28, 2016	2016 Democratic National Convention	Wells Fargo Center, Philadelphia, Pennsylvania	Pennsylvania	
September 20–26, 2016	United Nations General Assembly 71st Session	United Nations Headquarters, New York City, New York	New York	
January 20, 2017	First inauguration of Donald Trump	United States Capitol, Washington, D.C.	DC	
February 28, 2017	2017 Presidential Address to Congress	United States Capitol, Washington, D.C.	DC	
September 19–25, 2017	United Nations General Assembly 72nd Session	United Nations Headquarters, New York City, New York	New York	
January 30, 2018	2018 State of the Union Address	United States Capitol, Washington, D.C.	DC	
September 25 – October 1, 2018	United Nations General Assembly 73rd Session	United Nations Headquarters, New York City, New York	New York	
December 3–5, 2018	State funeral of George H. W. Bush	Washington, D.C. Houston, Spring, and College Station, Texas	DC; Texas	
February 5, 2019	2019 State of the Union Address	United States Capitol, Washington, D.C.	DC	
September 24–30, 2019	United Nations General Assembly 74th Session	United Nations Headquarters, New York City, New York	New York	
February 4, 2020	2020 State of the Union Address	United States Capitol, Washington, D.C.	DC	
August 17–20, 2020	2020 Democratic National Convention	Wisconsin Center, Milwaukee, Wisconsin (and various locations remotely)	Wisconsin	
August 24–27, 2020	2020 Republican National Convention	Charlotte Convention Center, Charlotte, North Carolina; Andrew W. Mellon Auditorium, Washington, D.C. (and various locations remotely)	DC; North Carolina	
January 20, 2021	Inauguration of Joe Biden	United States Capitol, Washington, D.C.	DC	
April 28, 2021	2021 Presidential Address to Congress	United States Capitol, Washington, D.C.	DC	
September 21–27, 2021	United Nations General Assembly 76th Session	United Nations Headquarters, New York City, New York	New York	
February 13, 2022	Super Bowl LVI	SoFi Stadium, Los Angeles	California	
September 20–26, 2022	United Nations General Assembly 77th Session	United Nations Headquarters, New York City, New York	New York	
March 1, 2022	2022 State of the Union Address	United States Capitol, Washington, D.C.	DC	
June 6–10, 2022	9th Summit of the Americas	L.A. Live, Los Angeles, California	California	Events thru-out Los Angeles
February 7, 2023	2023 State of the Union Address	United States Capitol, Washington, D.C.	DC	
September 19–26, 2023	United Nations General Assembly 78th Session	United Nations Headquarters, New York City, New York	New York	
November 12–18, 2023	APEC United States 2023	Moscone Center, San Francisco, California	California	
March 7, 2024	2024 State of the Union Address	United States Capitol, Washington, D.C.	DC	
July 9–11, 2024	2024 NATO Washington Summit	Washington, DC	DC	
July 15–18, 2024	2024 Republican National Convention	Fiserv Forum, Milwaukee, Wisconsin	Wisconsin	The Republican Convention began two days after the first assassination attempt on Donald Trump.
August 19–22, 2024	2024 Democratic National Convention	United Center, Chicago, Illinois	Illinois	
September 24–30, 2024	United Nations General Assembly 79th Session	United Nations Headquarters, New York City, New York	New York	
January 4–9, 2025	State funeral of Jimmy Carter	Washington, D.C. Plains, Georgia	DC; Georgia	
January 6, 2025	2025 Electoral College vote count	United States Capitol, Washington, D.C.	DC	
January 20, 2025	Second inauguration of Donald Trump	United States Capitol, Washington, D.C.	DC	
February 2, 2025	67th Grammy Awards	Crypto.com Arena, Los Angeles	California	
February 9, 2025	Super Bowl LIX	Caesars Superdome, New Orleans	Louisiana	President Donald Trump was in attendance for this Super Bowl
March 4, 2025	2025 Presidential Address to Congress	United States Capitol, Washington, D.C.	DC	
June 14, 2025	US Army 250th Anniversary Parade	National Mall, Washington, D.C.	DC	
September 22–30, 2025	United Nations General Assembly 80th Session	United Nations Headquarters, New York City, New York	New York	
February 8, 2026	Super Bowl LX	Levi's Stadium, Santa Clara, California	California	
February 24, 2026	2026 State of the Union Address	United States Capitol, Washington, D.C.	DC	
July 4, 2026	Salute to America 250	National Mall, Washington, D.C.	DC	
July 19, 2026	2026 FIFA World Cup Final	MetLife Stadium, East Rutherford, New Jersey	New Jersey	President Donald Trump was in attendance for the match, as well as Canadian Prime Minister Mark Carney and Mexican president Claudia Sheinbaum
September 22–28, 2026	United Nations General Assembly 81st Session	United Nations Headquarters, New York City, New York	New York	
July 14–30, 2028	2028 Summer Olympic Games	Los Angeles, California	California	
