= Donald Trump speech to a joint session of Congress =

Donald Trump speech to a joint session of Congress may refer to:

- 2017 Donald Trump speech to a joint session of Congress, on Tuesday, February 28, 2017, at 9:00 p.m. EST
- 2025 Donald Trump speech to a joint session of Congress, on Tuesday, March 4, 2025, at 9:19 p.m. EST
