= 2019 State of the Union Address =

Speech by US President Donald Trump

- Full video of the speech as published by the White House
- Date: February 5, 2019
- Time: 9:00 p.m. EST
- Duration: 1 hour, 22 minutes
- Venue: House Chamber, United States Capitol
- Location: Washington, D.C.; 38°53′19.8″N 77°00′32.8″W
- Type: State of the Union Address
- Participants: Donald Trump; Mike Pence; Nancy Pelosi
- Footage: C-SPAN
- Previous: 2018 State of the Union Address
- Next: 2020 State of the Union Address
- Website: Full text by Archives.gov

Donald Trump, the 45th president of the United States, delivered a State of the Union address on February 5, 2019, at 9:00 p.m. EST, in the chamber of the United States House of Representatives to the 116th United States Congress. It was Trump's second State of the Union Address and his third speech to a joint session of the United States Congress during his first term. Presiding over this joint session was the House speaker, Nancy Pelosi, accompanied by Mike Pence, the vice president, in his capacity as the president of the Senate.

It was the first address to a Democratic-controlled House of Representatives since 2010.

The Democratic Response was given by 2018 Georgia gubernatorial nominee Stacey Abrams and the Spanish-language response was given by California attorney general and former U.S. representative Xavier Becerra.

The address was watched by 46.8 million viewers, and aired live on 12 major television networks. Viewership statistics do not include views from online live streams. There were also 15.2 million interactions regarding the address on social media.

== Background ==
Article II, Section 3, Clause 1 of the United States Constitution states that the president "shall from time to time give to the Congress Information of the State of the Union, and recommend to their Consideration such measures as he shall judge necessary and expedient."

Speaker of the House Nancy Pelosi sent an invitation to President Donald Trump on January 3, 2019, to deliver a "State of the Union address before a Joint Session of Congress on Tuesday, January 29, 2019 in the House Chamber." The invitation was sent just hours after her election to Speaker of the House. On January 6, President Trump commented to reporters that "I will be making the State of the Union on January 29. And I look forward to it. I look forward to it. And I look forward to speaking, really, before the world. We have a lot of great things to say."

The Cabinet of Donald Trump, the heads of the 14 of 15 executive departments, Joint Chiefs of Staff, the nine sitting Supreme Court justices, and members of Congress were invited to attend. Fifteen guests chosen by First Lady Melania Trump were present in the gallery. Energy Secretary Rick Perry was not in attendance as he was named the designated survivor.

== Postponement ==
Originally scheduled for January 29, House Speaker, Nancy Pelosi, communicated on January 16 that pursuant to the month-long shutdown of the federal government, citing fears of security concerns regarding unpaid Secret Service members, the President could reschedule the Address or submit a written State of the Union to Congress. (Note: In Pelosi's January 16 letter, she wrote that in September 2018, Secretary of Homeland Security Kirstjen Nielsen had designated State of the Union Addresses as National Special Security Event (NSSEs) in 2018 to ensure adequate security for the events which requires weeks of preparation. Nielsen responded by saying DHS was "fully prepared" for the Address.) Pelosi formally communicated on January 23 that a resolution authorizing the speech in the House chamber would not be considered until the shutdown had ended. Trump, who had earlier mulled giving the speech in an alternative location, announced he would wait to give the State of the Union Address after the end of the shutdown. The shutdown was suspended on January 25, (Note: The terms of ending the shutdown allow three weeks for Congress to negotiate and potentially pass a new funding bill. Failure to pass a bill by that deadline could result in another shutdown.) and on January 28, Pelosi issued an invitation for Trump to deliver the Address in the Capitol Building on February 5, 2019. On the same day, Trump accepted Pelosi's proposed date.

== Address ==
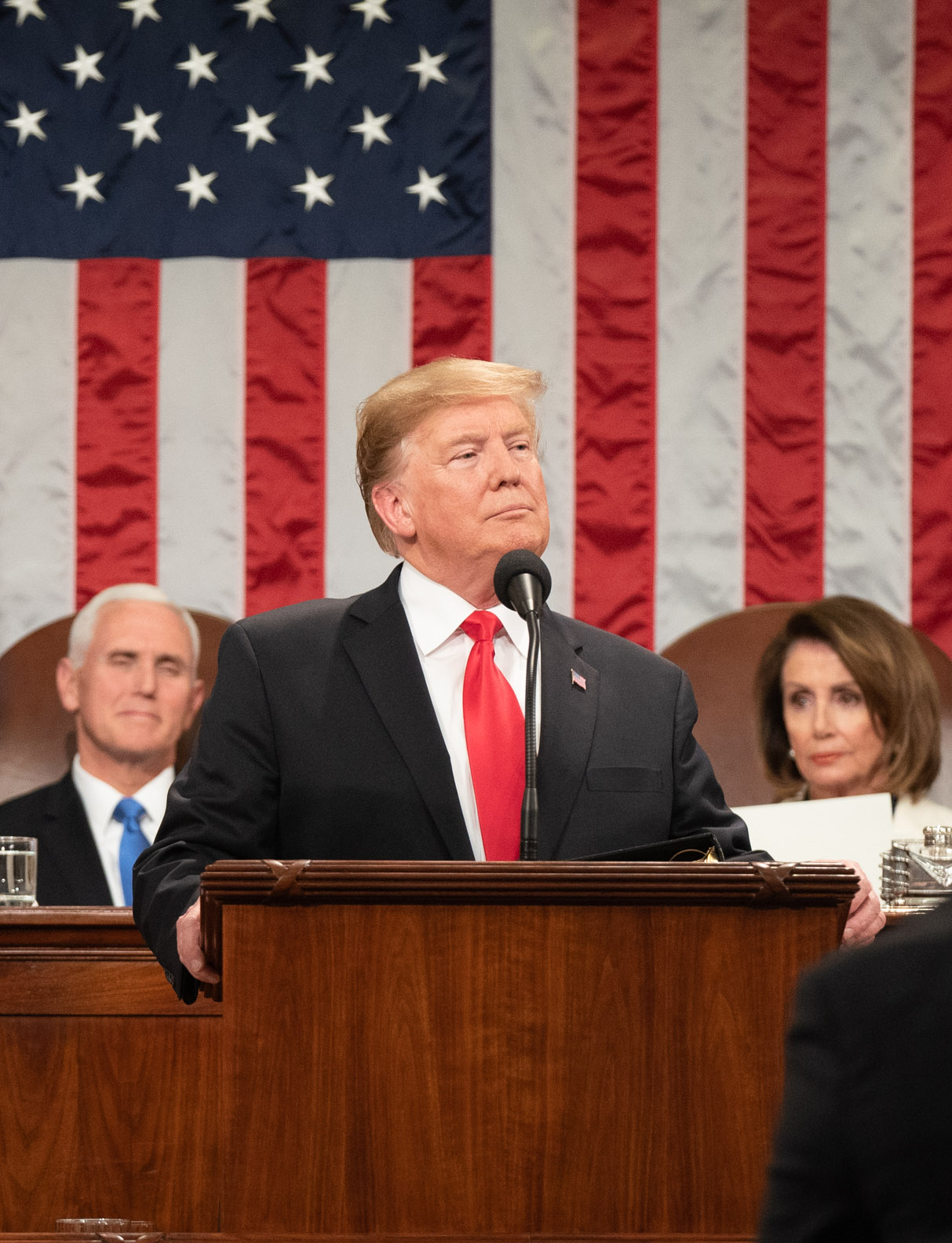
President Trump delivering the State of the Union address to the U.S. Congress

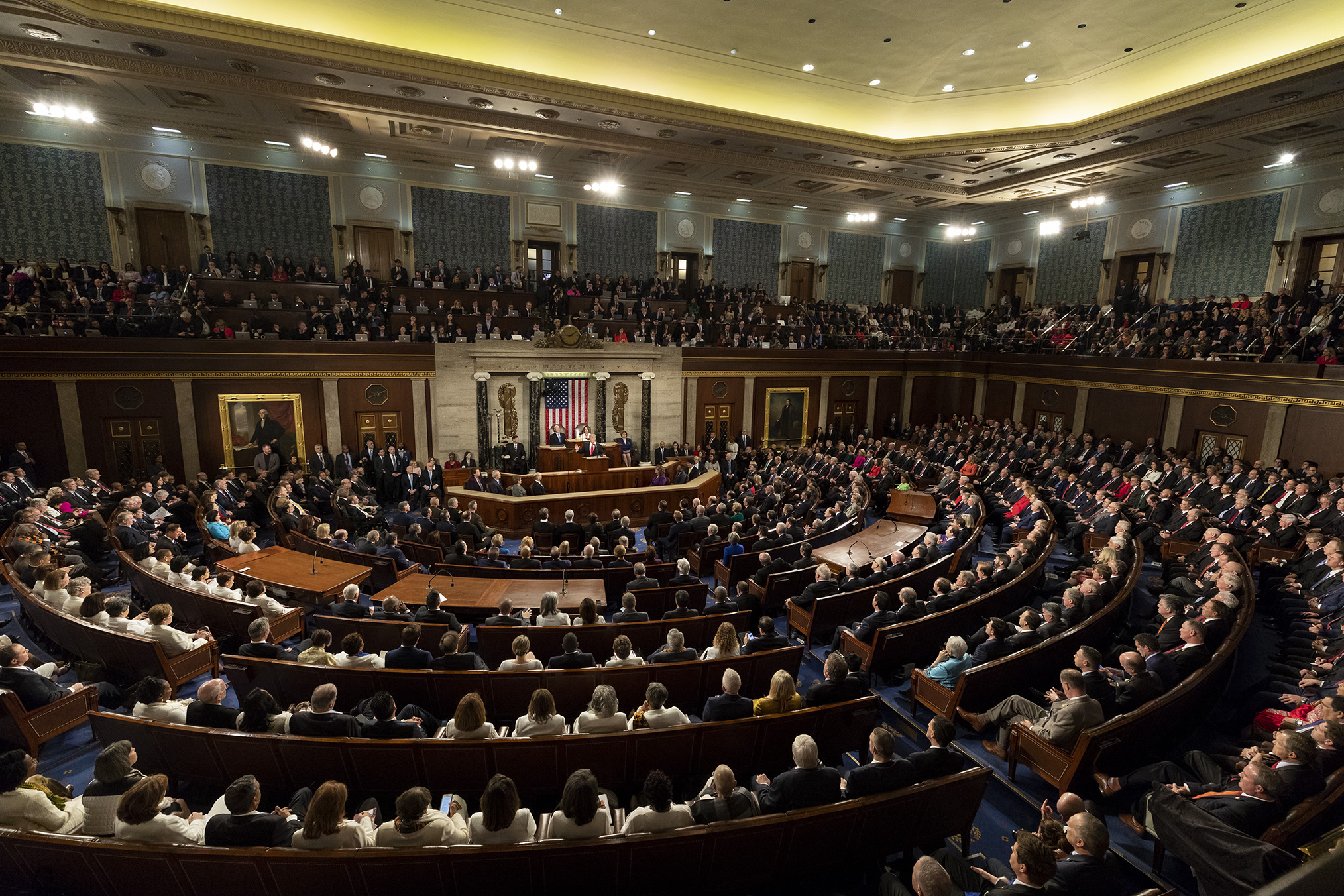
Photo taken during the 2019 State of the Union address

The State of the Union Address was given at 9:00 p.m. EST on February 5, 2019. President Trump began the address without an introduction from Speaker Pelosi, breaking with a SOTU custom. During the speech, Vice President Mike Pence and Speaker of the House Nancy Pelosi sat behind Trump. U.S. Secretary of Energy Rick Perry was named the designated survivor and was at an undisclosed location during the address so that, in case of a catastrophe, the continuity of government would be upheld.

The speech lasted 82 minutes, making it the third longest State of the Union Address. During the speech, Trump discussed bipartisanship, the economy, jobs, unemployment, tax reform, energy production, unity, the opioid crisis, prison reform, immigration, border security, the border wall, trade, infrastructure, prescription drugs, HIV/AIDS, cancer, family leave, abortion, national security, North Korea, Venezuela, the Middle East, ISIS, Afghanistan, Iran, antisemitism, veterans, and opportunity. He also discussed the Intermediate-Range Nuclear Forces Treaty, socialism, and the War in Afghanistan.

During the address, President Trump announced his next summit with North Korean leader Kim Jong-un. The summit took place on February 27–28, 2019 in Vietnam.

In his Address, Trump asserted that "The savage gang MS-13 now operates in at least 20 different American states and they almost all come through our southern border... Just yesterday, an MS-13 gang member was taken into custody for a fatal shooting on a subway platform in New York City. We are removing these gang members by the thousands, but until we secure our border, they are going to keep streaming right back in." The Washington Post fact checker found that MS-13 is active primarily in Los Angeles, Long Island (New York), and the Washington, D.C. metro area. The Washington Post also concluded that 1,332 illegal alien members of MS-13 were deported in fiscal year 2018.

== Protests ==
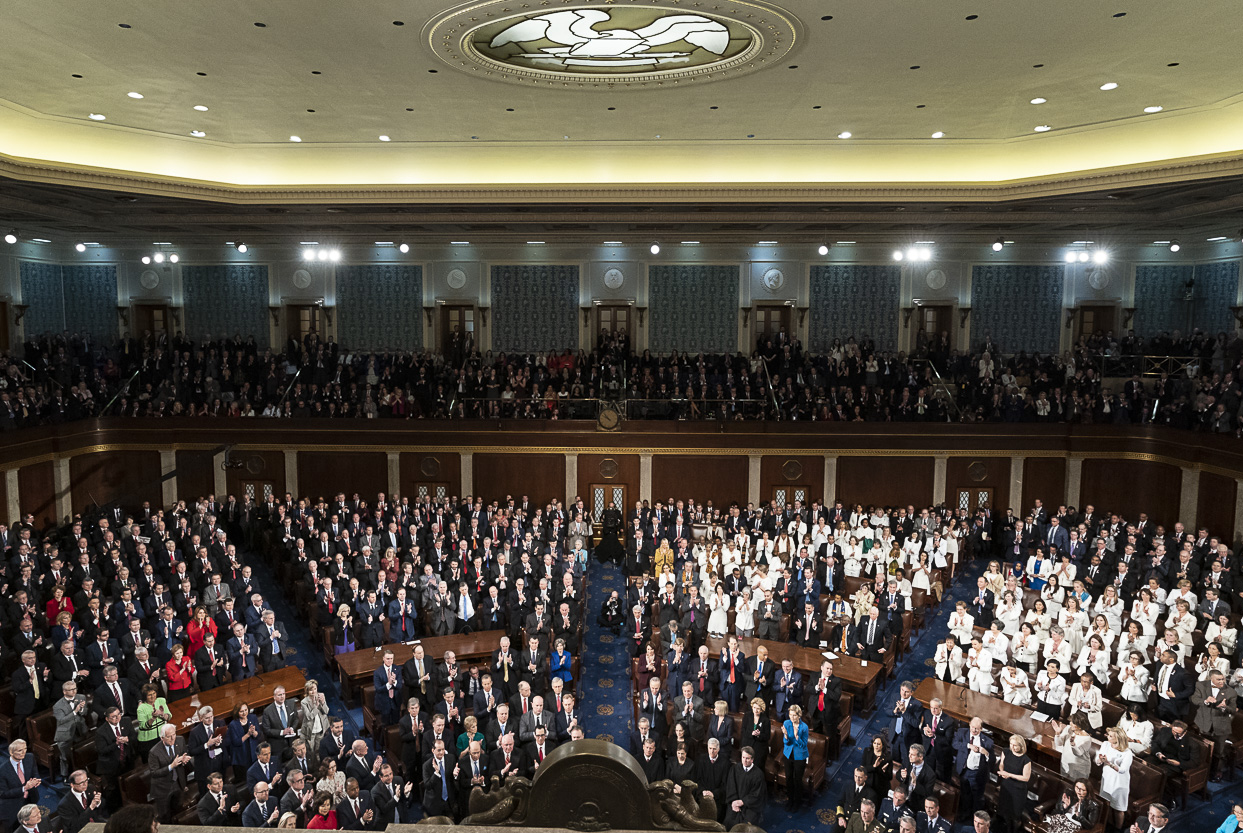
A group of female Democratic members of Congress wore white to highlight women's rights.

A group of female Democratic members of Congress and their guests wore white (the color of the women's suffrage movement) to bring notice to women's rights. Steny Hoyer also handed out white ribbons to males.

Each member of Congress is allowed to bring one guest and several Democratic members of Congress brought various guests to send a message. Representative Alexandria Ocasio-Cortez brought a sexual assault survivor, Pramila Jayapal brought a climate change scientist, and Ilhan Omar brought an undocumented immigrant threatened with deportation.

Several Democratic members of congress boycotted Trump's speech in protest, including Earl Blumenauer, Steve Cohen, John Lewis, and Hank Johnson.

== Notable invitations ==
- Timothy Matson – Police officer with the Pittsburgh Police Department and a member of the SWAT team that responded to the October 2018 Pittsburgh synagogue shooting incident. One of several officers wounded during the attack, Matson was struck 7 times by gunfire during the exchange with Robert Gregory Bowers, the alleged perpetrator of the attack.
- Judah Samet – Survivor of the Holocaust and the Pittsburgh synagogue shooting that occurred at the Tree of Life synagogue where Samet has been a member for 54 years. During the address, Trump mentioned that "Today is Judah's 81st birthday" after which the chamber and attendees honored Mr. Samet by singing Happy Birthday.
- Buzz Aldrin – Retired USAF Colonel, Korean War veteran, astronaut on Gemini 12 and Apollo 11, second man to walk on the Moon.
- Alice Marie Johnson – Charged with a mandatory life sentence without parole in connection to a nonviolent drug crime. President Trump granted Johnson clemency after learning about her story from Kim Kardashian.
- Elvin Hernandez – A Special Agent with the Trafficking in Persons Unit of the Department of Homeland Security’s Homeland Security Investigations division. Hernandez has more than 18 years of federal law enforcement experience investigating narcotics, gangs, and human trafficking.
- Herman Zeitchik – At age 18, Herman Zeitchik was among the 4th Infantry Division soldiers who landed at Utah Beach early on the morning of June 6, 1944. Zeitchik helped liberate Paris, hold back the Nazis at the Battle of the Bulge, and free starving prisoners at the Dachau Concentration Camp.
- Joseph Reilly – The night before American soldiers stormed the beaches of Normandy, Reilly and the 101st Airborne Division parachuted behind enemy lines. He and his fellow soldiers helped secure Utah Beach and the first foothold in America's liberation of Western Europe. Reilly also fought in Operation Market Garden, Battle of the Bulge, and the battle of the Ruhr Pocket.
- Irving Locker – American veteran Irving Locker landed at Utah Beach on D-Day with the 116th AAA gun battalion. He fought through five major battles of World War II, including the Battle of the Bulge, and later helped liberate a Holocaust concentration camp.
- Joshua Kaufman – Kaufman endured the horrors of Auschwitz and survived the Dachau Concentration Camp, where he was saved by American soldiers which included Herman Zeitchik. By the end of the war, Joshua had lost most of his family. He left Europe for Israel in 1949 and joined the Israel Defense Forces, fighting in several wars.
- Matthew Charles – In 1996, he was sentenced to 35 years in prison for selling crack cocaine and other related offenses. While in prison, Charles renewed his faith in Christianity, completed more than 30 Bible studies, became a law clerk, taught GED classes, and mentored fellow inmates. On January 3, 2019, Charles was the first prisoner released as a result of the First Step Act.

== Responses ==
On January 29, 2019, Senate Minority Leader Chuck Schumer (D-NY) announced that Stacey Abrams would deliver the Democratic response to 2019 State of the Union Address. California Attorney General Xavier Becerra gave the Spanish-language response.

The response by the Libertarian Party was given by Jeff Hewitt. Independent Senator Bernie Sanders (VT) also gave a response to the address.

== Coverage ==
The State of the Union Address was televised on all the major U.S. broadcast and cable television networks. Facebook and Twitter streamed the address online.

=== Viewership ===
Total cable and network viewers

Network	Viewers
FNC	11,122,000
NBC	7,142,000
CBS	6,679,000
ABC	5,905,000
Fox	4,169,000
MSNBC	3,785,000
CNN	3,442,000

Broadcast news channels

Network news channels

== Reactions ==
Polls conducted by CBS gauged approval of speech, viewership, among other things. A poll by CBS found 76% of people approved of the speech. Another poll by CBS based on party identification found that 43% of Republicans, 24% of Democrats, and 30% of Independents watched the address. Another poll based on party identification found that 97% of Republicans, 30% of Democrats, and 82% of Independents approved the message of the speech.

Polls conducted by CNN gauged approval of speech, policy approval, among other things. 59% of viewers approved the President's address. 71% of viewers thought that the President's policies were moving the country in the right direction; 76% on economy, 70% on trade and national security, 68% on immigration, and 65% on taxes.

== Fundraising by Trump's 2020 campaign ==
A fundraising effort by Trump's 2020 campaign on the days leading to the address and on the day of the address raised $2.4 million from 76,000 donors. His campaign displayed names of donors on a live streaming broadcast of the event on Donald Trump's Facebook page. This is comparable to fundraising for Trump's 2020 campaign that occurred during the 2018 address that similarly included the display of names of donors on a streaming broadcast online.

== See also ==
- List of joint sessions of the United States Congress
- Timeline of the first Trump presidency (2019 Q1)

Preceded by 2018 State of the Union Address	State of the Union Addresses; 2019	Succeeded by 2020 State of the Union Address
