= Ji Seong-ho =

North Korean defector and South Korean politician (born 1982)

Ji Seong-ho MP
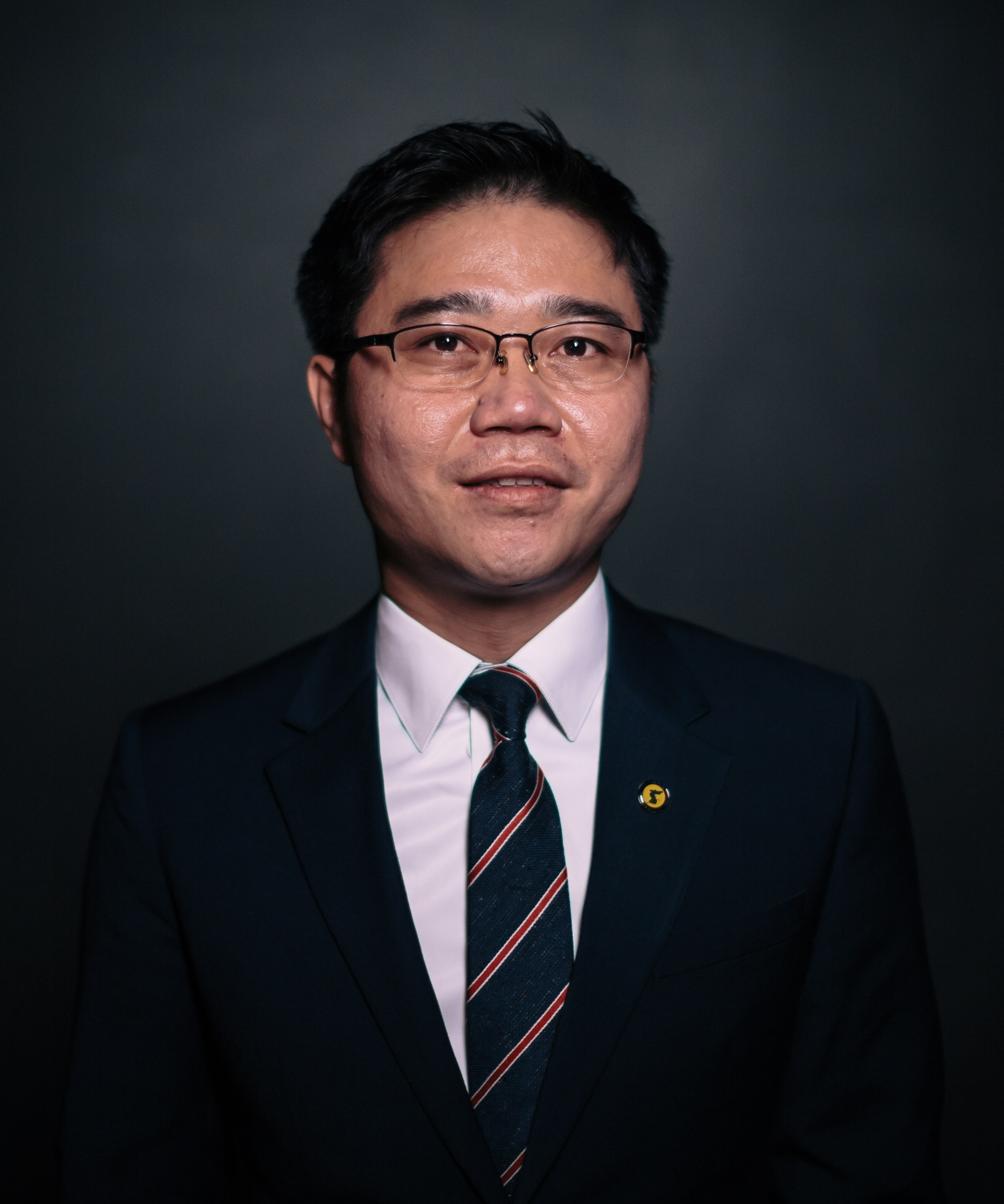
- Ji in 2018

Member of the National Assembly
- In office May 30, 2020 – May 29, 2024
- Constituency: Proportional

Personal details
- Born: April 3, 1982 (age 44) North Hamgyong Province, North Korea
- Party: People Power Party (2020–present)
- Other political affiliations: Future Korea Party (2020)
- Occupation: Human rights activist, speaker

Korean name
- Hangul: 지성호
- Hanja: 池成浩
- RR: Ji Seongho
- MR: Chi Sŏngho

Ji Seong-ho (Korean: 지성호; born April 3, 1982) is a South Korean politician who is a member of the National Assembly as a member of the People Power Party (PPP). Born in North Hamgyong, North Korea, in 1982, he defected to South Korea in 2006, where he worked to raise awareness about the situation in North Korea and to help fellow defectors. He was elected as a member of the National Assembly in the 2020 South Korean legislative election.

== Early life in North Korea ==
Ji was born on April 3, 1982, not far from the Hoeryong concentration camp, and grew up during the North Korean famine of the mid-1990s. In 1995, his grandmother died of starvation. "The family survived by eating the ground-up cores of corn husks and the roots of cabbages", according to one report. Ji later said, "There was no meat and never any oil ... Sometimes we could get seaweed and we would also eat mountain grasses ... At harvest time, rats in the field would stash seeds down their burrows, which we would dig up. Often the rats would attack us and we would club some of them to death and that would give us a real feast." Every few days, Ji would go out and steal coal from trains and try to exchange it in the markets for food.

On March 7, 1996, Ji, then in his early teens, was on a train stealing coal with his mother and sister when he lost consciousness from hunger while jumping from one train car to another and fell through a gap between the cars. He later recalled regaining consciousness and seeing the rear of the train receding down the track and then realizing it had run over his body. "A piece of very thin flesh was holding my leg to the rest of my body. Blood was gushing out", he recalled. "I needed to stop the bleeding. When I tried to work on my leg, I realized that three of my fingers on my left hand had been sheared off." He underwent a four-and-a-half hour operation without anesthetic. "The doctors were thinking whether they should let me die or if it was worth it to operate", he later explained. "My mom was pleading and crying, so they decided to operate ... On the operating table I could feel everything that was being done to my body. I was screaming at the top of my lungs ... I felt the saw cutting into the bone of my leg, and the scalpel through my flesh. Every time I passed out from the pain the surgeon would slap my face to keep me awake. The whole hospital heard my screams ... The simplest thing to do was cut off everything. They didn't try to save my remaining two fingers, they just cut off my hand."

His father had been a devoted member of the ruling North Korean Workers' Party, but the accident and its aftermath changed his views. "When my father came to see me after the accident happened", Ji later told The Guardian, "he finally realized that it was more important to save his family rather than the party." For ten months, "his father nursed him back to health primarily by feeding him a little bit more food than usual, which he got by lessening the rations allocated for the other family members." At times Ji blamed his father for his accident, because even though his father was a Party member, Ji had to scrounge coal in order to eat. After the accident, his father "felt guilty" and "often apologized" to him. Eventually Ji realized "that it wasn't my father's fault, but the fault of the North Korean regime for not taking care of people."

Ji's recovery lasted about 10 months without any proper rehabilitation. He reportedly had many infections while being treated at home. His father did extra labor to get medicine and antibiotics from a marketplace. He struggled during this time due to seclusion from society and stated his one wish was to walk again. During his recovery, his family bought penicillin on the black market. According to The Australian, the packages of medicine "still bore the UN labels that revealed they were from a misappropriated aid shipment."

At one point Ji crossed the border into China in search of food; on his return, he was arrested and tortured and his crutches were taken from him. "The police severely beat me for a week, maybe more than other escapees. They told me that because I am disabled I brought shame to North Korea and that someone with only one leg should stay home", he stated. This experience caused him to lose his trust in the North Korean government. This event, he related, was the main motivation for his desire to leave North Korea and relocate to another nation.

=== Escape ===
Ji's mother and sister defected from North Korea in 2004. In 2006, Ji and his brother escaped from the North, crossing the Tumen River into China. Ji nearly drowned in the river. After the crossing, Ji insisted that his brother leave him behind, lest his disability result in capture for both of them. With the aid of religious groups and others, Ji managed to make his way across China. He was ultimately reunited with his brother in South Korea. Ji's mother and sister disappeared after their defection and he has not heard from them since. He left the North "because [he] was in search of freedom. In more simple terms, [he] wanted to be treated as a human."

Ji's father tried to cross into China the same way, but was caught and murdered.

== South Korea ==
After settling in South Korea, Ji converted to Christianity and has initiated various projects to help North Koreans who are still in the North as well as those who have escaped to the South.

A December 2011 report described him as "well integrated" compared to most other defectors, and said that "his surviving relatives have joined him". Also, government help had allowed him to enroll in college to study law. He had founded a group called Now Action & Unity for NK Human Rights (NAUH), which "raises awareness of North Korean human-rights abuses and has paid for defectors to move from China to South Korea". The group's members "hold street campaigns during weekends in Seoul, unfurling banners and giving out leaflets, and organise lectures". The report stated that Ji was "grateful for his new life" every day.

He said that he had experienced a mixture of feelings at the news of Kim Jong Il's death on December 17, 2011. "When I first heard about Kim Jong-il's death I felt exultation, but there were many thoughts", he said. "I thought about my father's death. I regret that Kim Jong-il died too happily, too easily. But I thought, now North Korea's 23 million people can live a better life." He hoped that the regime change would make a positive difference for the North Korean people. "I'm living a better life in South Korea now, but I'm sorry for the other North Koreans still suffering under the dictatorship", he said. "It's the difference between heaven and hell. In North Korea you live the life of a machine." Saying that North Koreans "weren't brainwashed to worship Kim Jong-un", he said, "I expect the third generation of the dictatorship will not last long because of that fact." He also said that he believed the peninsula would be unified in his lifetime.

A May 2012 report described Ji as a law student and stated that he held a silent demonstration against North Korea every week.

On December 11, 2014, Ji addressed the British Parliament. At that time, he was reportedly researching for a book on North Korea's abuse of its disabled population.

In April 2015, he said that his favorite part of the recently released film The Interview, a comedy in which Kim Jong Un is murdered, was when Sook, a North Korean interpreter played by Diana Bang, turns against the regime. "It shows it's possible", Ji commented. Ji's activities, reported the Hollywood Reporter at the time, "are operated on a shoestring, out of an office far too small for all of the boxes of supplies it houses". Ji stated his motivations are to provide opportunities to North Korean youth under the same circumstances he had been under.

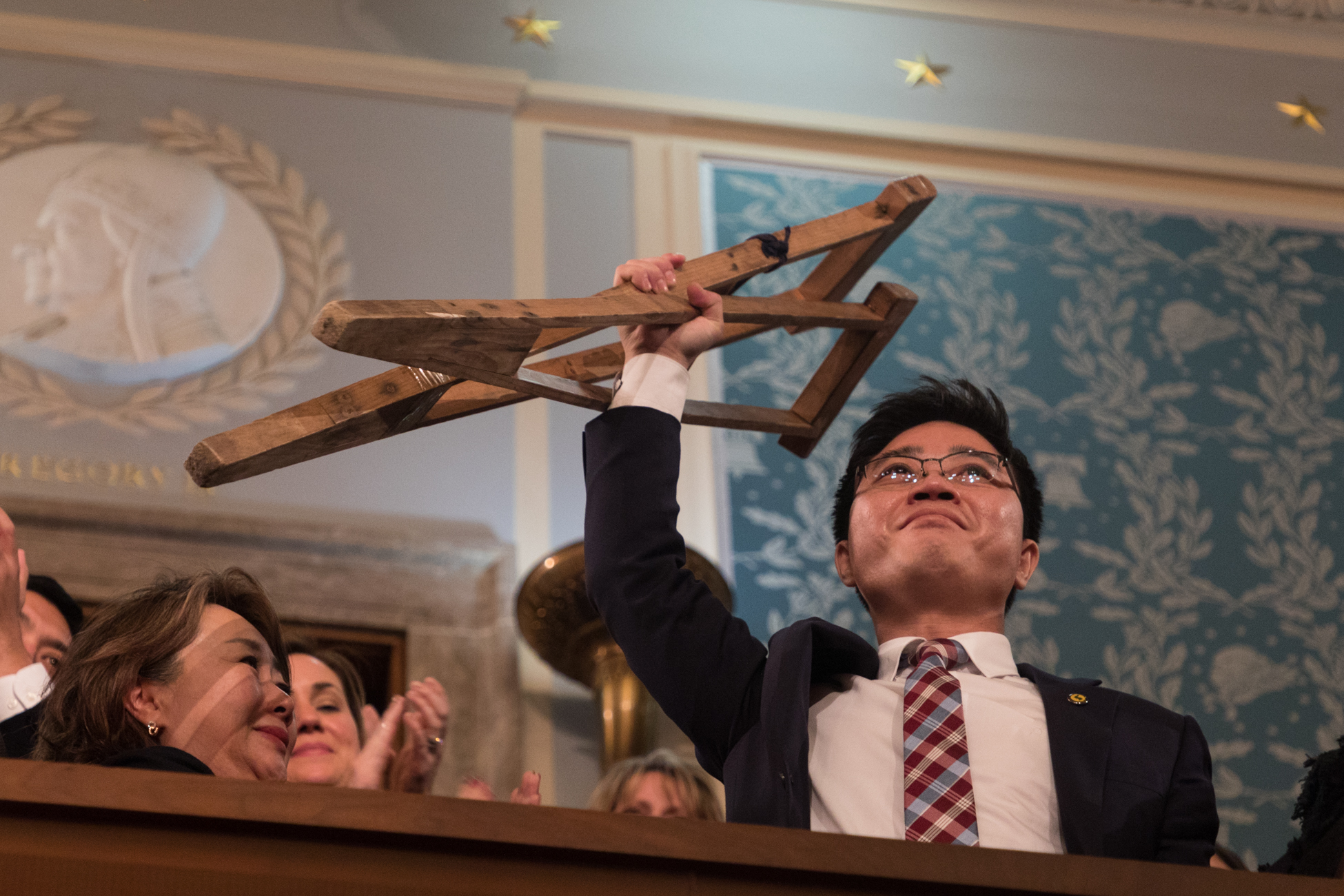
Ji holding up his old crutches at the 2018 State of the Union Address

On February 25, 2017, Ji presented a lecture in Dodds Auditorium as a part of the PNKHR Conference. He discussed the lack of support of disabled citizens by the North Korean government who did not provide disabled people with "adequate medical attention". Ji went on to describe that even after successfully escaping North Korea, many defectors face a "psychological longing for their family members". One of the many difficulties defectors faced on their journey was not being able to escape with their elderly family members. Since the nature of the journey was exhausting and wearisome, most elderly citizens were either dead or caught.

On January 30, 2018, Ji attended the 2018 State of the Union Address at the invitation of U.S. President Donald Trump, who told Ji's story of escape from North Korea, stating it as a "testament to the yearning of every human soul to live in freedom".

=== Member of the National Assembly ===
Ji ran as a member the Future Korea Party, the sister party of the United Future Party, in the 2020 South Korean legislative election, and was elected as a member of the National Assembly.

In May 2020, Ji apologised to voters for claiming he was 99% certain that Kim Jong Un had died during a three-week period when Kim was not portrayed in the media. The Democratic Party criticised Ji for carelessness, with some members urging that Ji should be excluded from the intelligence and defence committees.

=== Governor ===
In May 2024, Ji ceased to serve as a lawmaker with the ruling People Power Party. On August 14, 2024, Ji was appointed as the governor of North Hamgyong province, which was a vice-minister level position under the Ministry of the Interior and Safety. As the province is occupied by North Korea, it's a largely ceremonial role.

== Views ==
Ji has stated in an interview that "I think that freedom means being able to do what you want without harming others". "Freedom isn't something given by the government. I think it is a God-given right, and you are born with this right as a human being ... I only had a vague understanding of what freedom meant when I was back in North Korea ... When I thought about freedom or rights, I thought it was a concept that was given under the great leader. Everything was subordinate to the great leader of North Korea."

December 2014 articles in the British press cited Ji and other defectors to the effect that North Korea was "systematically purging its disabled population by making them disappear from public sight, subjecting them to chemical weapons tests and castrating them". Ji said that the regime felt "humiliated" by disabled people and that "babies with mental and physical disabilities are routinely snatched from hospitals and left to suffer 'indescribable things' until they die." Ji stated: "The regime proclaims: 'There are no people with disabilities under the Kims' rule' and 'everyone is equal and living well' ... And while that propaganda is going on, disabled children are being taken away, suffering indescribable things and dying." He said that two other defectors had "told him of a village in a remote mountain region that had been effectively turned into an asylum to house people with dwarfism". The male dwarfs, Ji stated, "were castrated so they would become extinct. There's no-one left there by now."

In October 2021, Ji stated that he felt the character Kang Sae-byeok from Squid Game was a realistic portrayal of North Korean defectors, stating that she reflected the truth of what it's like as a defector in South Korea. He made the argument that a majority of North Korean defectors are in vulnerable groups, stating that Sae-byeok's story is a realistic one.
