= 2020 State of the Union Address =

Speech by US President Donald Trump

- Full video of the speech as published by the White House
- Date: February 4, 2020
- Time: 9:00 p.m. EST
- Duration: 1 hour, 18 minutes
- Venue: House Chamber, United States Capitol
- Location: Washington, D.C.; 38°53′19.8″N 77°00′32.8″W
- Type: State of the Union Address
- Participants: Donald Trump; Mike Pence; Nancy Pelosi
- Footage: C-SPAN
- Previous: 2019 State of the Union Address
- Next: 2021 Joint session speech
- Website: Full text by Archives.gov

Donald Trump, the 45th president of the United States, delivered a State of the Union address on February 4, 2020, at 9:00 p.m. EST, in the chamber of the United States House of Representatives to the 116th United States Congress. It was Trump's third and final State of the Union Address and his fourth and final speech to a joint session of the United States Congress during his first term. Presiding over this joint session was the House speaker, Nancy Pelosi, accompanied by Mike Pence, the vice president, in his capacity as the president of the Senate.

The speech was the second State of the Union Address to be delivered by an impeached president, as the 1999 address by Bill Clinton was delivered during his impeachment trial. The address was aired on 12 television networks and was watched by 37.2 million viewers, not including views from online live streams. Overall viewership for the address was 20% lower than 2019. As Trump was concluding the state of the union address, Speaker Nancy Pelosi stood and ripped up her copy of the speech as a form of protest.

== Background ==
Article II, Section 3, Clause 1 of the United States Constitution states that the president "shall from time to time give to the Congress Information of the State of the Union, and recommend to their Consideration such measures as he shall judge necessary and expedient." Speaker of the House Nancy Pelosi sent an invitation to President Trump on December 20, 2019, two days after his impeachment by the House of Representatives.

CNN anchors were excluded from the annual pre-State of the Union lunch with the president. This was the first time in recent memory anchors from a specific network were forbidden from attending the lunch.

== Address ==
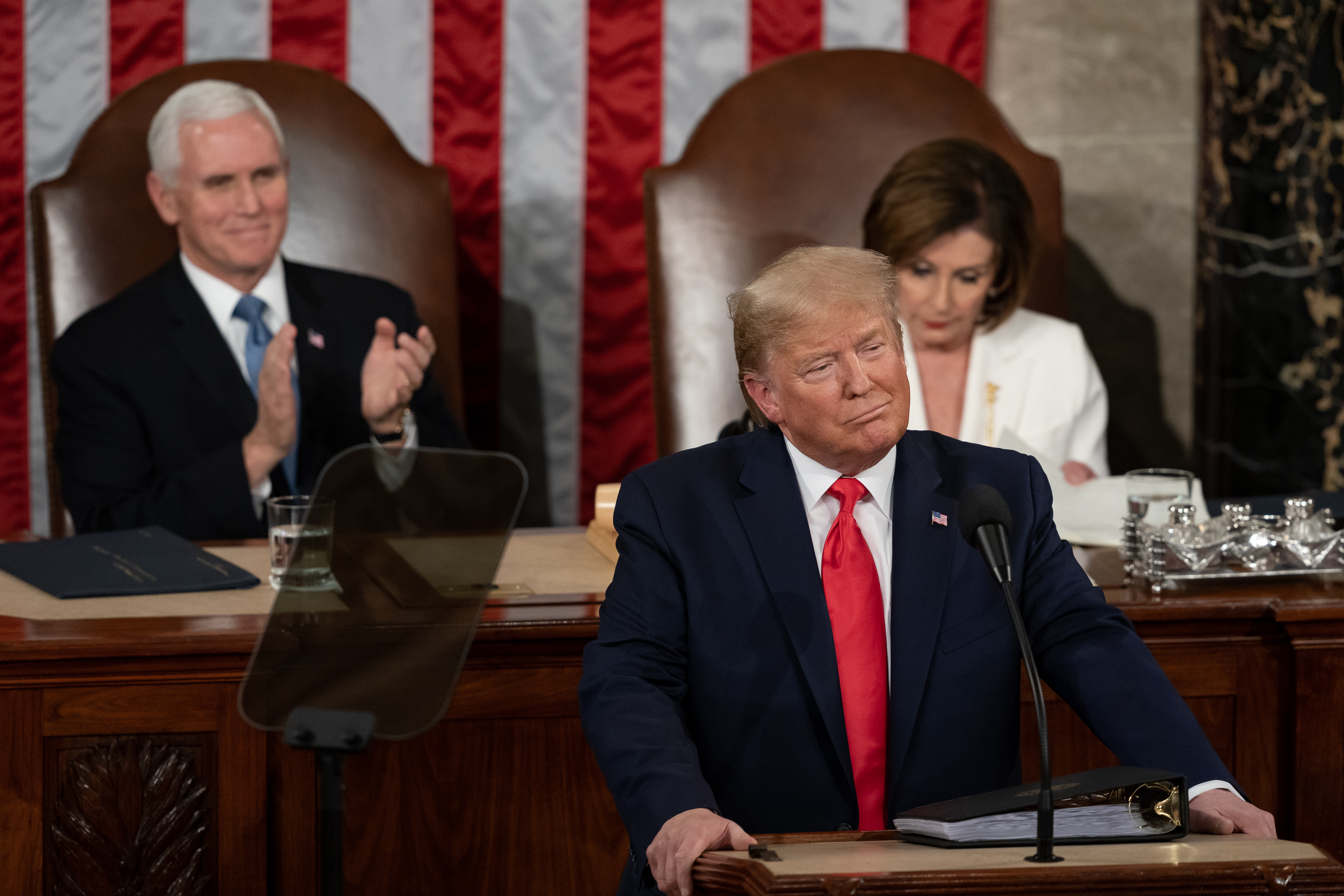
President Trump delivering the State of the Union address to the U.S. Congress

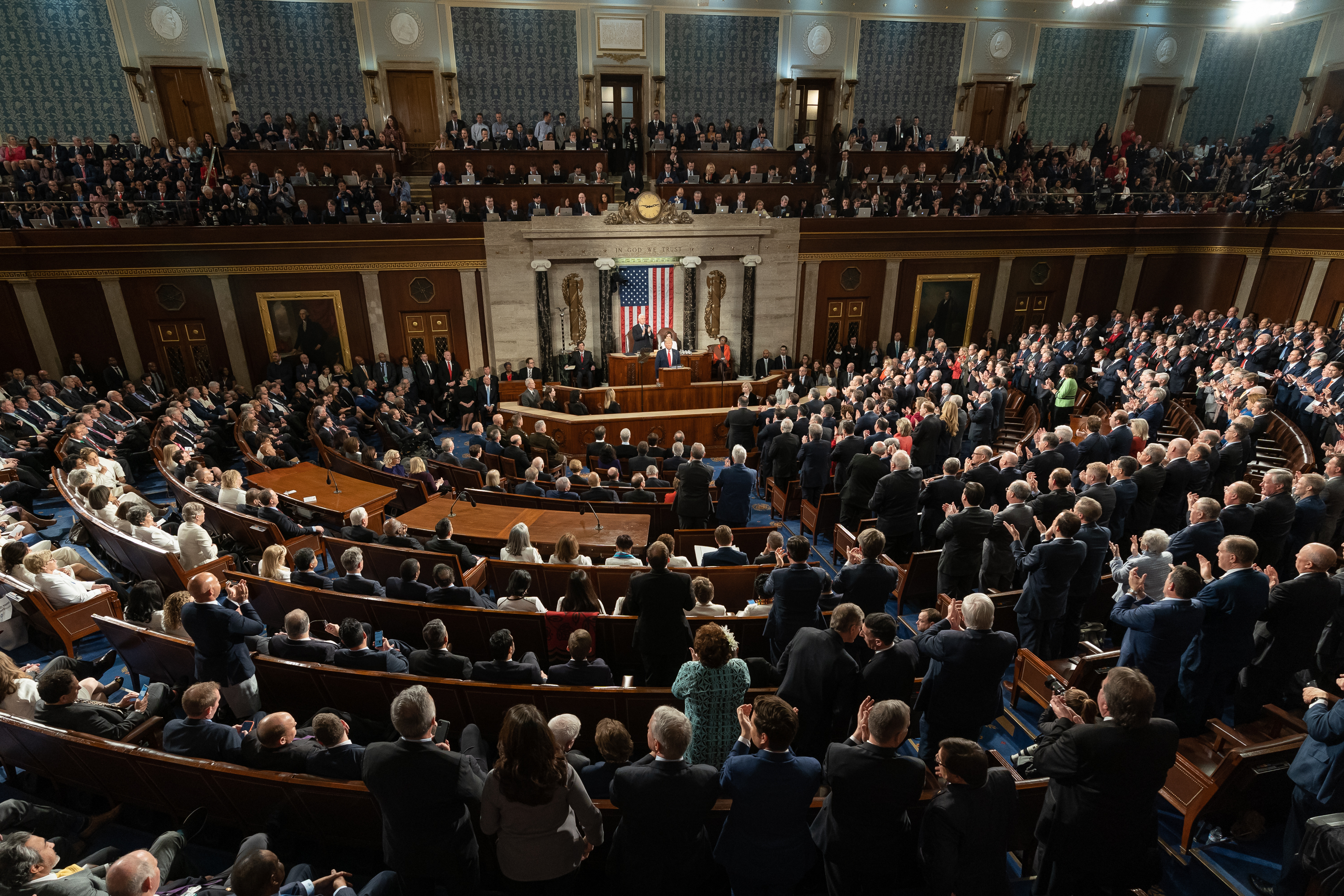
Republican members of Congress stand for applause during the address.

The State of the Union Address began at 9:00 p.m. EST and was televised and streamed by all major U.S. broadcast and cable television networks. The date for the address fell one day after the Iowa caucuses in the 2020 presidential election, and one day before the Senate vote on whether or not to convict Trump in his impeachment trial. As Trump entered the chamber, he appeared to snub Pelosi's offer of a handshake. Breaking with tradition again, Pelosi omitted the line "I have the high privilege and distinct honor of presenting to you" before introducing the president. Secretary of Interior David Bernhardt was named the designated survivor and was at an undisclosed location during the address so that, in case of a catastrophe, the continuity of government would be upheld.

The address lasted a total of 78 minutes; approximately 26 minutes of the address was consumed by audience applause, primarily from Republican lawmakers. Republican lawmakers in the audience shouted "four more years" before Trump began his address. The address, heralded by Trump as "the great American comeback", primarily focused on national security, the economy, health care, and foreign policy while avoiding topics such as environmental policy and climate change, the Mueller investigation, and his impeachment trial, which was expected to conclude the next day. Various media outlets reported that Trump made false or misleading claims during his address.

Among Trump's comments, he addressed the emerging COVID-19 pandemic: "We are coordinating with the Chinese government and working closely together on the coronavirus outbreak in China. My administration will take all necessary steps to safeguard our citizens from this threat."

=== Notable invitations ===
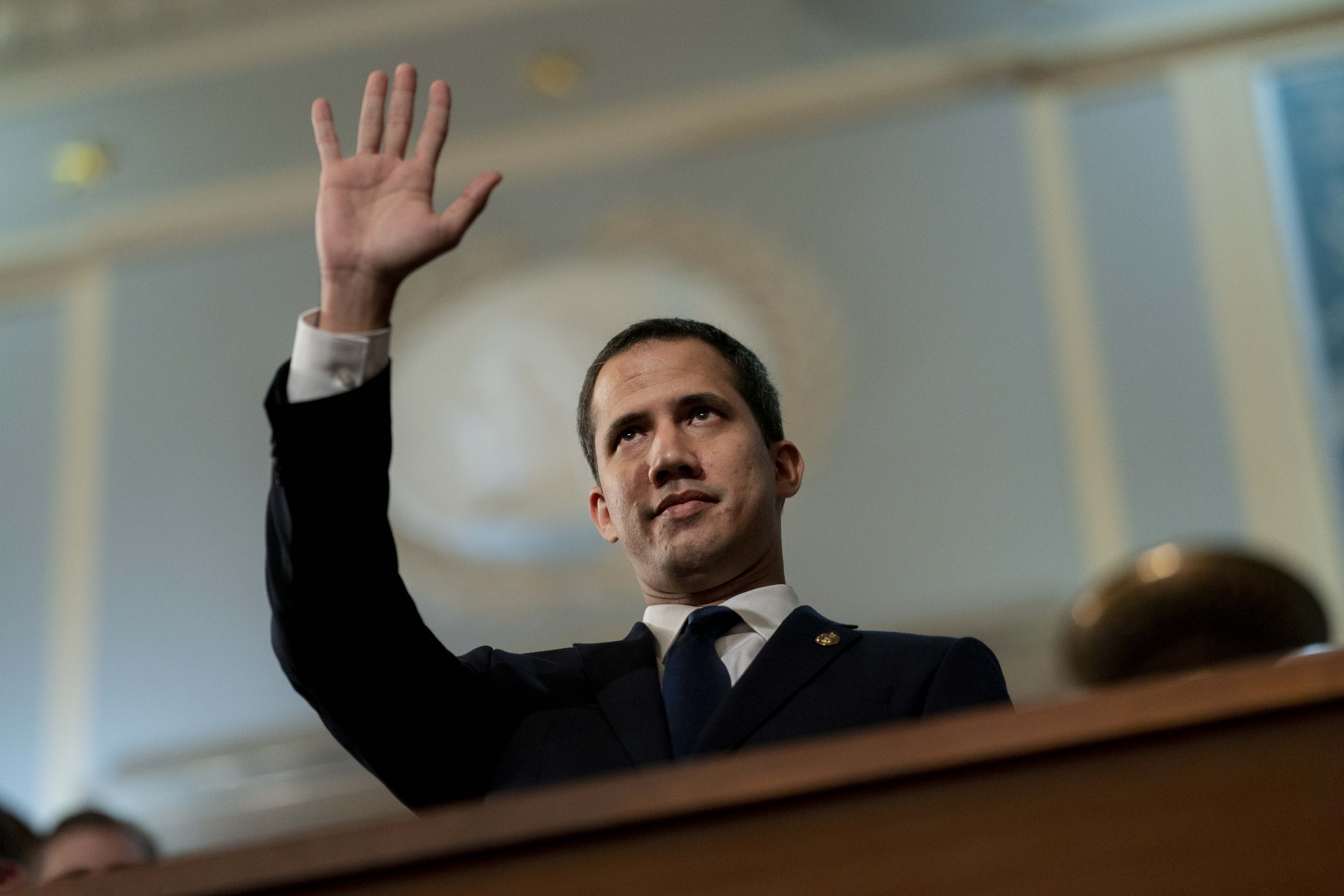
Juan Guaidó acknowledging Trump's support amidst the Venezuelan presidential crisis

Following a bipartisan tradition that dates back to the Reagan presidency, Trump invited and introduced guests during the speech.

- Stephanie Davis and her daughter Janiyah, a fourth-grade student from Philadelphia, Pennsylvania.
- Juan Guaidó from Caracas, Venezuela, the disputed interim president of Venezuela and leader of the Venezuelan National Assembly.
- Kelli Hake, and her son Gage Hake, from Stillwater, Oklahoma, whose husband and father, United States Army staff sergeant Christopher Hake, had been killed while serving his second tour of duty in Iraq.
- Jody Jones from Farmersville, California. In 2018, Jones' brother Rocky was shot and killed by an illegal immigrant in Tulare County, California.
- Iain Lanphier from Scottsdale, Arizona, the eighth-grade great-grandson of Tuskegee airman Charles McGee.
- Nathan Law, Hong Kong pro-democracy activist and promoter of the Hong Kong Human Rights and Democracy Act.
- Rush Limbaugh, radio talk show host from Palm Beach, Florida. During the address, Limbaugh was awarded the Presidential Medal of Freedom, presented by First Lady Melania Trump. Limbaugh had announced the day before that he had been diagnosed with advanced lung cancer; Limbaugh died the following year.
- Charles McGee from Bethesda, Maryland. A highly decorated combat veteran, McGee had earlier been promoted from colonel to brigadier general by the president, and the previous week had participated in the opening coin flip of Super Bowl LIV along with other World War II centenarian veterans.
- Paul Morrow from Montgomery, Alabama, a United States Army veteran who started a successful contracting business in Montgomery that helps support the U.S. Air Force's F-35 program.
- Carl and Marsha Mueller from Prescott, Arizona, whose daughter Kayla was a humanitarian aid worker kidnapped and killed by ISIS on her way back from a Doctors Without Borders hospital in Aleppo, Syria.
- Raul Ortiz from Del Rio, Texas, a Border Patrol deputy chief and U.S. Army veteran.
- Tony Rankins from Cincinnati, Ohio. A U.S. Army veteran, Rankins overcame post-traumatic stress disorder and became a successful skilled construction employee.
- Robin Schneider and her daughter Ellie from Kansas City, Missouri. Ellie, born at 21 weeks and six days, is one of the youngest babies to survive in the United States.
- Ivan Simonovis from Caracas, Venezuela, a former police chief who was imprisoned in 2004 for protecting protesters and was held in captivity for nearly 15 years and recently given political refugee status in the United States.
- Joshua Smith from Paducah, Kentucky, whose brother, Channing Smith, committed suicide after suffering from a social media cyber-assault by students from his high school.
- Amy Williams from Fort Bragg, North Carolina, a military spouse and a mother of two young children who was reunited with her husband Sergeant First Class Townsend Williams during the state of the union address.

=== Speaker Pelosi ripping up speech ===
Speaker of the House Nancy Pelosi tears up her copy of Trump's speech.

As the address concluded, Pelosi tore up her copy of the speech in four separate sections. "In case any confusion remained" regarding her actions, "Pelosi held up what remained of the address to her family in the gallery, in full view of reporters". Pelosi defended her actions, saying "He shredded the truth, so I shredded his speech. What we heard last night was a disgrace." Pelosi elaborated that "it was a courteous thing to do considering the alternatives. It was such a dirty speech." Subsequent to the address, a video showed Pelosi making small tears of the speech as it was being delivered. In a subsequent interview with CNN's Christiane Amanpour, Pelosi admitted to making small tears in her paper copy as the speech was being made, but denied that it was a part of a predetermined act to tear up the speech at its conclusion. Pelosi said that making small rips in the speech was simply a way of marking pages where she disagreed with the president. Some news outlets such as NBC assessed the act differently, "Before House Speaker Nancy Pelosi ripped President Donald Trump's printed State of the Union speech in half, it appears she made tiny tears on the sides to ensure that the moment would go smoothly."

After the address, the White House Twitter account posted "Speaker Pelosi just ripped up: One of our last surviving Tuskegee Airmen. The survival of a child born at 21 weeks. The mourning families of Rocky Jones and Kayla Mueller. A service member's reunion with his family. That's her legacy." Some conservative analysts claimed that Pelosi broke the law by tearing up the speech under 18 U.S.C. § 2071, claiming she had destroyed an official government document. However, numerous media and legal sources affirmed that no breach of the law had occurred as Pelosi's copy was not a copy that had been officially filed with a court or public office.

Reaction to Pelosi tearing up the speech followed party lines in the days following the SOTU. White House counselor Kellyanne Conway described it as a "temper tantrum" which she believed was typical for Pelosi. "America saw an incorrigible child ripping up the State of the Union," Conway told reporters the day after the speech. "I think it shows you how petty and peevish and partisan the Democratic Party has become." Representative Hakeem Jeffries of New York, the chairman of the House Democratic Caucus, praised Pelosi's actions saying, "As far as I'm concerned, a shredder wasn't available, and so she did what she needed to do." Representative Lois Frankel, Democrat of Florida, said "I think she did the only thing she could do within the realm of respectability. She basically said she had had it."

Then President Trump, along with future Speaker of the House Mike Johnson, falsely claimed that Pelosi broke Title 18 of the United States Code, Section 2071 by mutilating a record deposited with a member of public office. Experts such as William Eskridge, a professor at Yale Law, assert that she was not given an official copy and have confirmed this is a misrepresentation of the law in addition to being a violation of Pelosi's right to expression of free speech.

Pelosi later stated that she tore up Trump's State of the Union speech because "it was a manifesto of lies".

== Protests, boycotts and disruptions ==
Several members of Congress boycotted the State of the Union, including Democratic representatives Alexandria Ocasio-Cortez, Ayanna Pressley, Earl Blumenauer, Steve Cohen, Al Green, Hank Johnson, Maxine Waters, and Frederica Wilson. Carrying on a tradition started during the 2019 State of the Union Address, Democratic women who attended the speech dressed in white in reference to the women's suffrage movement and wore lapel pins with symbols for the Equal Rights Amendment and global warming (climate change).

During Trump's speech, after urging Congress to pursue legislation to lower prescription drug prices, several members of Congress began chanting "H.R. 3" in protest of the Senate's rejection of the Elijah Cummings Lower Drug Costs Now Act.

Democratic representative Tim Ryan walked out of the State of the Union and published a series of tweets, comparing the event to "watching professional wrestling". Gun control activist Fred Guttenberg, invited by Pelosi, was ejected after shouting in response to Trump's remarks about protecting the Second Amendment.

Democratic congressman Seth Moulton from Massachusetts, a Marine veteran, walked out in protest after Trump touted the support he has given to the military. Moulton clarified later that he walked out because "Trump—a draft dodger who has mocked Sen. John McCain, Gold Star families, and soldiers with traumatic brain injury—started talking about the good he has done for our military."

== Responses ==
Michigan governor Gretchen Whitmer gave the Democratic response. Texas representative Veronica Escobar gave a Spanish-language response. In addition, Senator and presidential candidate Bernie Sanders and Representative Ayanna Pressley gave their own personal responses.

== Coverage ==
The State of the Union Address was televised on all the major U.S. broadcast and cable television networks. Many news outlets streamed the address online.

=== Viewership ===
Of the 12 networks that covered the address, every network saw a drop in ratings compared to 2019, except for Fox News, which saw a 2% increase over 2019. Following the address, both CNN and MSNBC saw an increase in viewership during Gretchen Whitmer's official response to the address.

Total cable and network viewers

| Network | Viewers |
|---|---|
| FNC | 11.5 million |
| NBC | 4.8 million |
| CBS | 4.66 million |
| ABC | 4.12 million |
| Fox | 3.51 million |
| CNN | 2.78 million |
| MSNBC | 2.23 million |

Broadcast networks

Cable news networks

== See also ==
- List of joint sessions of the United States Congress
- Timeline of the first Trump presidency (2020 Q1)

| Preceded by 2019 State of the Union Address | State of the Union addresses 2020 | Succeeded by 2021 joint session speech |
