= Judah Samet =

Holocaust survivor (1938–2022)

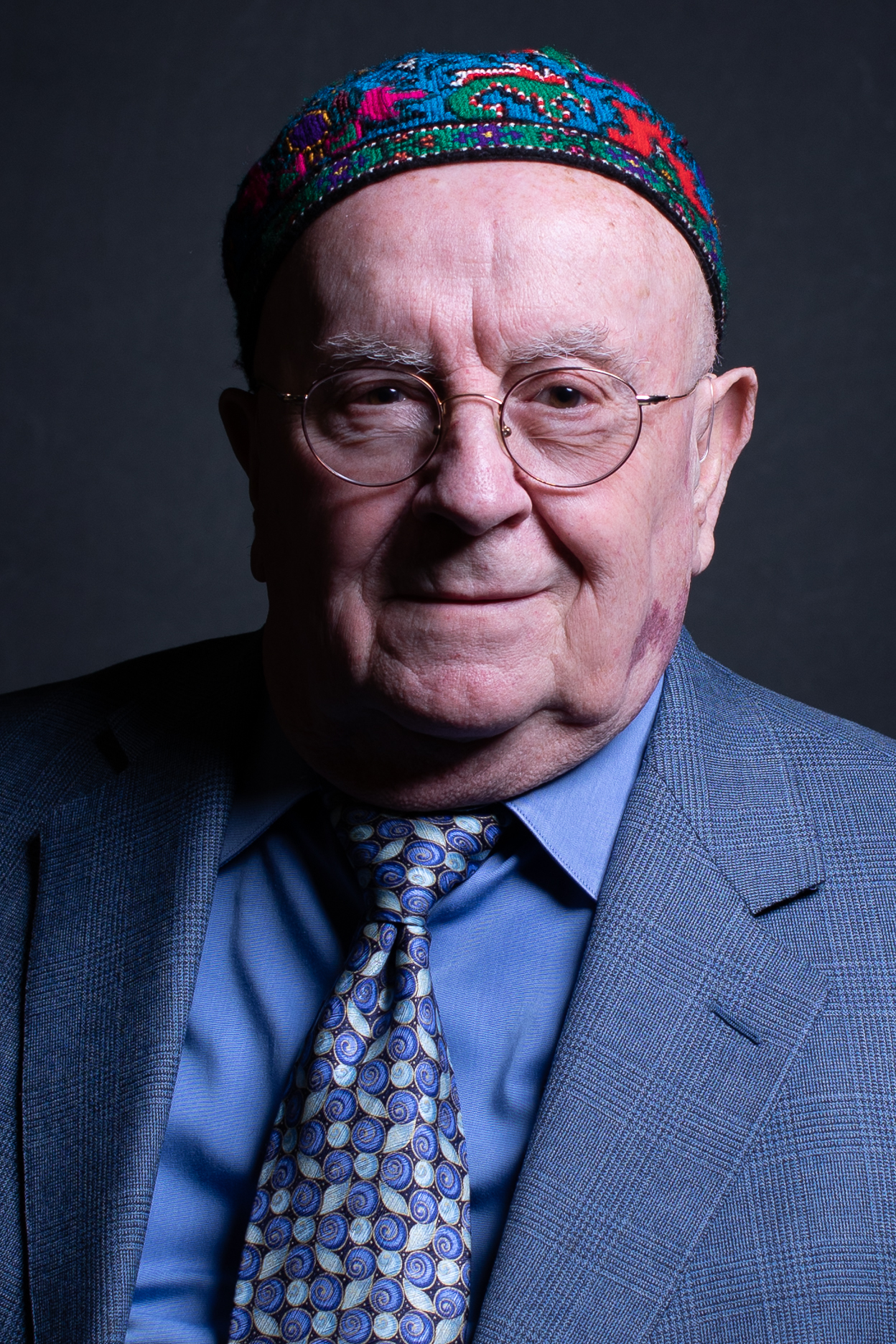
- Samet in 2019
- Born: February 5, 1938; Debrecen, Kingdom of Hungary
- Died: September 27, 2022 (aged 84); Pittsburgh, Pennsylvania, U.S.
- Occupations: Jeweler, speaker
- Known for: Holocaust survivor, survivor of Pittsburgh synagogue shooting

Judah Samet (Hebrew: יהודה סמט; February 5, 1938 – September 27, 2022) was a Hungarian-American businessman, speaker, and Holocaust survivor. At the age of six, he and his family were taken from Debrecen, Hungary, to the Bergen-Belsen concentration camp, where they spent eleven months. After the Second World War the family immigrated to Israel, where he subsequently served in the Israel Defense Forces and worked as a teacher. He later moved to Canada and then to the United States. In 2018, he was a witness to and survivor of the Pittsburgh synagogue shooting. He was a jeweler and speaker in Pittsburgh, Pennsylvania.

== Early life ==
Judah Samet was born in Debrecen, Hungary on February 5, 1938, to an Orthodox Jewish family. His parents owned and managed two knitting factories and had four children: two sons, Moshe and Yakove, both older than Judah, and the youngest, a daughter, Henyah. The family lived across the street from the synagogue.

=== Holocaust ===
In March 1944, Nazis entered Debrecen and forced thousands of Jews into railcars with limited space, food and water. Samet remembers them being ignored by other citizens. He was with his family in a train going to the Auschwitz concentration camp, but it was rerouted to the Bergen-Belsen concentration camp after Czechoslovak partisans reportedly destroyed train tracks. Samet's father had received tickets and passports to emigrate to the United States but the family was not able to leave in time. Before they were sent to Bergen-Belsen, Samet and his family were held at a lumberyard in Austria. They got to the camp around July 1944, where Samet could only eat flavored water ("soup") and "moldy, rock-hard bread" every day, and sometimes bit bones to try to ease the starvation. Samet and his siblings would receive some bread from their mother, which he described as the reason they stayed alive. Samet's mother told him to eat lice, which had infected the camp. A German soldier contemplated killing Samet's mother because she asked for more supplies, but his superior officer decided to keep her as an interpreter for the Gestapo. A fellow inmate of Samet's performed a surgery on Samet's abscess on the back of his head.

After eleven months in the camp Samet and his family were sent by train to an unknown location. It was speculated that they were going to the Theresienstadt Ghetto, or off a bridge. The train stopped in a forest close to Berlin, and an armored tank or infantry division showed up. Samet's father then pointed out that the tank's commander was American, and he was later revealed to be a Jew. Samet's father Yekutil died a week later from typhoid fever.

Through Paris and Marseille, Samet and his family moved to Israel in 1946, where they lived in an Orthodox orphanage. Samet graduated from a seminary high school.

== Career and activities ==
After graduation Samet served in the Israel Defense Forces' Paratroopers Brigade. His brother Jacob died in the Suez Crisis as a machine gunner for the IDF. He also worked as a teacher and managed two towns for the government of Israel.

Joining family members, Samet moved to Toronto in 1961 and subsequently to New York City. In New York City, he worked at his uncle's coat factory. He met a teacher from Pittsburgh, Barbara, whom he later married and with whom he had a daughter, Elizabeth. Samet moved to Pittsburgh in 1962. He attended Duquesne University but did not graduate. In the Downtown Pittsburgh Clark Building, Samet managed and ultimately owned Irving Schiffman Jewelers, founded in 1941 by his father-in-law. Samet also worked as a teacher. He served for 40 years as a Torah reader and cantor at the Conservative Tree of Life – Or L'Simcha Congregation, where he had been a member since 1964.

From 2011, Samet gave public speeches about his life at high schools, universities, and churches. He said that he was "energized" by the positive reception of his speeches.

=== Pittsburgh synagogue shooting ===
On October 27, 2018, eleven Jews were killed and seven injured in a mass shooting during Shabbat services at the Tree of Life building, marking the deadliest antisemitic attack in U.S. history. Samet was four or five minutes late to the service because he had been delayed by his housekeeper. When he pulled into a handicapped spot on the parking lot, he was approached by a man who told him to leave due to the active shooter. Before pulling out of the parking lot unharmed, Samet had a clear vision of the shooting exchange between the gunman and a police officer.

I was flushed with (memories of) the concentration camp. It kind of descended on me. And I was thinking to myself, "It never ends, it never ends for my family." Whoever thought when you come to America, you're gonna go through the same thing all over again?

— Judah Samet, in Pittsburgh Tribune-Review (2018)

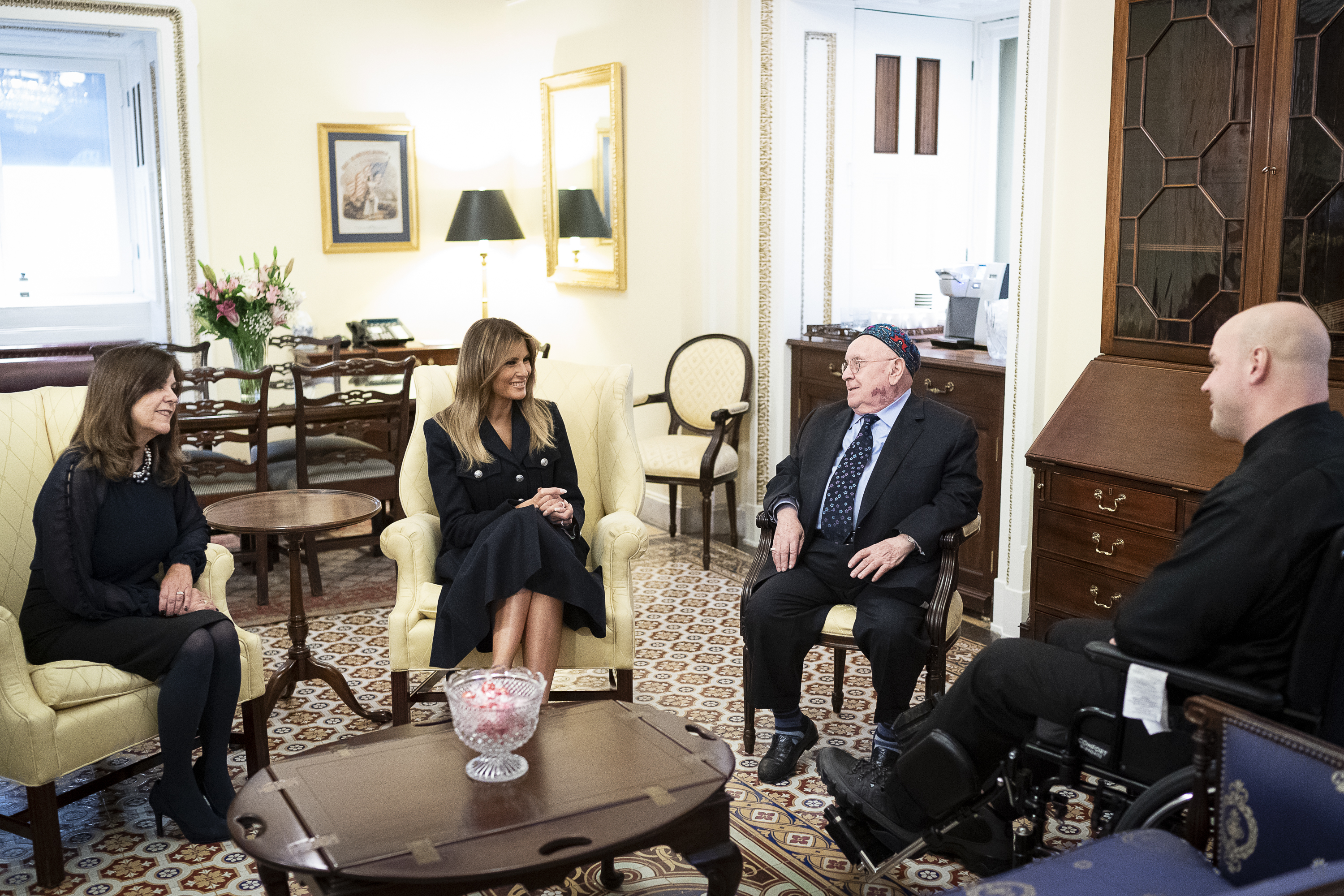
Left to right: Second Lady of the U.S. Karen Pence, First Lady of the U.S. Melania Trump, Samet, and Pittsburgh police Officer Timothy Matson, at a listening session prior to the 2019 State of the Union Address

U.S. President Donald Trump invited Samet to be one of his personal guests at the 2019 State of the Union Address, which Trump gave on February 5, 2019. Samet visited the White House and met President Trump, First Lady Melania Trump, First Daughter Ivanka Trump, and Senior Advisor to the President Jared Kushner. After Trump introduced Samet in the Address and noted that it was Samet's 81st birthday, the crowd applauded, gave him a standing ovation, and sang "Happy Birthday" to him. Samet smiled, blew a kiss, waved down to Trump, stood up, bowed his head, and shouted "thank you". Trump jokingly conducted with his hands and said, "They wouldn't do that for me". He was not wearing his kippah at the Address because a government employee had told him "nobody wears a hat here" upon entering the House Chamber. Samet later said that he admired Trump and called him a "working man". A Republican, Samet supported Trump, saying about him: "I like him very much. He is strongly pro-Israel. That a man would go outright for Israel and declare for Jerusalem to be the capital of Israel ... that was something new." He was, however, not politically active, as opposed to his Democratic family members.

== Personal life and death ==
Samet died from complications of stomach cancer in Pittsburgh, Pennsylvania, on September 27, 2022, at the age of 84.
