= 2016 State of the Union Address =

Speech by US President Barack Obama

- Full video of the speech as published by the White House
- Date: January 12, 2016
- Time: 9:00 p.m. EST
- Duration: 58 minutes
- Venue: House Chamber, United States Capitol
- Location: Washington, D.C.; 38°53′19.8″N 77°00′32.8″W
- Type: State of the Union Address
- Participants: Barack Obama; Joe Biden; Paul Ryan
- Footage: C-SPAN
- Previous: 2015 State of the Union Address
- Next: 2017 Joint session speech
- Website: Full text by Archives.gov

The 2016 State of the Union Address was given by the 44th president of the United States, Barack Obama, on January 12, 2016, at 9:00 p.m. EST, in the chamber of the United States House of Representatives to the 114th United States Congress. It was Obama's seventh and final State of the Union Address and his eighth and final speech to a joint session of the United States Congress. Presiding over this joint session was the House speaker, Paul Ryan, accompanied by Joe Biden, the vice president, in his capacity as the president of the Senate.

In an effort to expand on the presidential administration's use of the Internet to reach American citizens, the 2016 State of the Union Address broadcasts live on the White House website, as well as on the White House YouTube channel.

Senate President pro tempore Orrin Hatch and Secretary of Homeland Security Jeh Johnson were the designated survivors for the 2016 address.

The Address was watched by 31.3 million viewers.

== Address contents and delivery ==
The President opened the speech by welcoming the Speaker, Vice President, Members of Congress, and fellow Americans. He noted that this was his eighth speech, and promised it would be shorter than usual, joking that he knew "some of you are antsy to get back to Iowa." He recognized people's generally low expectations for meaningful legislation due to 2016 being an election year, and thanked the House Speaker Paul Ryan for his help passing the budget and making tax cuts permanent for working families. He expressed hope that progress could be made on "bipartisan priorities like criminal justice reform, and helping people who are battling prescription drug abuse."

He then listed proposals for the year ahead, per tradition. They included helping students learn to write computer code, personalizing medical treatments for patients, fixing the immigration system he called broken, protecting US children from gun violence, achieving equal pay for equal work in a nod towards gender equality, implementing paid leave, and raising the minimum wage.

He then took a longer term approach and said he wanted focus on "the next five years, ten years, and beyond." He recognized that the country was in a time of technological change that was having a big impact on people's lives and the planet. The benefits technology brings to medical science and improving education for remote students were contrasted with the strain disruptive technologies place on working families, and the benefits terrorists gain from access to communication technologies. He called on America to overcome these fears and face the future with optimism. He also highlighted America's diversity, strong work ethic, and commitment to rule of law as things necessary to ensure prosperity and security. He stressed that these traits are what got the country through the recent economic crisis, and what led to affordable health care, the resurgence of the US energy sector, greater benefits for troops and veterans and the legal acceptance of Gay marriage.

He then listed what he called four big questions the country has to answer:

- "First, how do we give everyone a fair shot at opportunity and security in this new economy?
- Second, how do we make technology work for us, and not against us — especially when it comes to solving urgent challenges like climate change?
- Third, how do we keep America safe and lead the world without becoming its policeman?
- And finally, how can we make our politics reflect what’s best in us, and not what’s worst?"

He praised the US economy as the strongest in the world, and noted the strong recent job growth, along with a reduction in deficits. He criticized those who claimed America's economy is in decline, as "peddling fiction". He noted that many jobs are vulnerable, giving workers less leverage, and the ability of jobs to relocate globally adds to the competitive challenge. He spoke of how this causes companies to be less loyal to communities, and leads to concentration of wealth at the top of the social system. He also pointed out that the composition of the modern workplace makes it harder for working-class people to succeed.

He then asked for support for programs to counteract this: "providing Pre-K for all, offering every student the hands-on computer science and math classes that make them job-ready on day one, and we should recruit and support more great teachers for our kids." He also asked for steps to make college more affordable, including a proposal to provide two years of community college at no cost for every student. He also pointed out the importance of savings and benefits for retirement. He called on strengthening social security and Medicare, and using the Affordable Care Act to cover people in the event of catastrophic health disasters. In addition to health protection, the President also suggested implementing training programs to help people who lose their jobs find new more modern jobs. Expanding tax cuts for low income families without children was also discussed.

He then spoke about the recent failure of the financial system, and pointed out that "Food Stamp recipients didn’t cause the financial crisis; recklessness on Wall Street did." He criticized businesses that avoided their tax bills by creating offshore accounts. He stressed how he wanted to empower small businesses and spread their best practices across the country.

He then addressed his second question, how to reignite the spirit of innovation in the country to meet challenges. He told the story of the Russians beating the US into space, and how that galvanized the US space program, leading to the first moonwalk. He mentioned the importance of an open Internet and taking steps to get more students and entrepreneurs online.

He then announced what he called "a new moonshot", for America to cure cancer. A national effort was announced, with Joe Biden in charge. The importance of medical research was reiterated, and the topic was shifted to developing clean energy sources. After criticizing opponents of climate change mitigation, he stressed that even for those who don't believe in global warming, they should embrace "the chance for American businesses to produce and sell the energy of the future." The success of earlier investments in clean energy such as wind power and solar energy, along with corresponding reductions in foreign oil imports, carbon pollution reductions and the current low price of gas were also highlighted. He asked for an increase in clean energy research, and a push for higher taxes for oil and gas production, to better reflect the cost to the environment of those fuels. The tax money would be earmarked for building 21st century transportation systems.

He then addressed the third question, how to ensure America's safety without either becoming isolationist or having to nation-build across the world. He highlighted the strength of the US military, and criticized those who claimed America was getting weaker as its enemies were getting stronger. He pointed out that failing states were the biggest threat to the US, not evil empires. He listed as his top priority "protecting the American people and going after terrorist networks." He discussed the threat of al Qaeda and ISIL, but pointed out that they did not threaten "our national existence," and dismissed claims otherwise as harmful propaganda. He then detailed the American and 60 country coalition efforts to defeat terrorism and to "cut off ISIL’s financing, disrupt their plots, stop the flow of terrorist fighters, and stamp out their vicious ideology. With nearly 10,000 air strikes, we are taking out their leadership, their oil, their training camps, and their weapons. We are training, arming, and supporting forces who are steadily reclaiming territory in Iraq and Syria."

He called on Congress to authorize military force if they were "serious about winning this war", but also stated that even without military action the terrorists will not succeed. He invoked several high-profile captures and killings, including the deaths of Osama bin Laden and the leader of al Qaeda in Yemen, and the imprisonment of the perpetrator of the Benghazi attacks. He also addressed the broader threat to world peace, including "many parts of the world — in the Middle East, in Afghanistan and Pakistan, in parts of Central America, Africa and Asia."

To address these challenges, he called for "a smarter approach, a patient and disciplined strategy that uses every element of our national power. It says America will always act, alone if necessary, to protect our people and our allies; but on issues of global concern, we will mobilize the world to work with us, and make sure other countries pull their own weight." He pointed out how that was US strategy in Syria and Iran. The success in stamping out the recent Ebola epidemic was mentioned. The President also asked for support ratifying the Trans-Pacific Partnership, as a way to "open markets, protect workers and the environment, and advance American leadership in Asia." He then highlighted the restoration of diplomatic efforts with Cuba, after fifty years of isolation. He called on Congress to lift the embargo.

He then listed a few areas of American leadership: fighting climate change, defending Ukraine, resolving the war in Colombia, feeding the poor in Africa, ending HIV/AIDS and trying to eliminate Malaria. He reiterated an earlier campaign goal to shut down the prison at Guantanamo, citing the expense and how it is used as a recruiting tool for America's enemies.

This led to a condemnation of the current climate of bigotry. He asked that people not be targeted for their race and religion, and instead asked that Americans respect its diversity. He quoted Pope Francis “to imitate the hatred and violence of tyrants and murderers is the best way to take their place.”

He then invoked the opening words of the constitution, “We the People”, to transition into his fourth and final question, how to fix domestic politics. He acknowledged that people would not agree on everything and this was due to the size and diversity of the country, and the distributed power structure. He then called for a willingness to compromise and listen to others, and pointed out that the average person needed to feel as empowered as so-called special interests.

Obama then stated that one of the few regrets of his presidency was " that the rancor and suspicion between the parties has gotten worse instead of better. There’s no doubt a president with the gifts of Lincoln or Roosevelt might have better bridged the divide, and I guarantee I’ll keep trying to be better so long as I hold this office." He pointed out that he felt many of his listeners felt the same way, and have told him privately that systemic change is needed. He then mentioned two solutions: ending congressional redistricting to prevent politicians from picking who can vote for them, and implementing campaign finance reform. He acknowledged that change had to come from the people, not elected officials, and implored people to not give up. He called on Americans to vote, be heard and remain active in public life.

He invoked ordinary citizens he sees doing extraordinary and inspirational things, and concluded with "Thank you, God bless you, and God bless the United States of America."

== Response ==
=== Republican Party ===
South Carolina Governor Nikki Haley gave the Republican response and Florida Congressman Mario Díaz-Balart gave the party's official Spanish language response.

=== Libertarian Party ===
Nicholas Sarwark, chairman of the Libertarian National Committee (2014–present) delivered the official Libertarian Party rebuttal to the State of the Union.

=== Socialist Alternative ===
Seattle City Council member Kshama Sawant gave the Socialist Alternative response.

=== Green Party of the United States ===
The Green Party of the United States response was given by Jill Stein, Craig Seeman, Andrea Mérida, Joe Manchik, Margaret Flowers, Arn Menconi, Joe DeMare, Shamako Noble, and Matt Funiciello.

== See also ==
- 2016 United States presidential election

| Preceded by 2015 State of the Union Address | State of the Union addresses 2016 | Succeeded by 2017 joint session speech |
