= Cancer Breakthroughs 2020 =

Coalition on immunotherapies against cancer

- Mission statement: To accelerate the potential of combination immunotherapies as the next generation standard of care in patients with cancer
- Products: Cancer treatments immunotherapy
- Founder: Dr. Patrick Soon-Shiong
- Key people: Dr. Patrick Soon-Shiong
- Established: January 2016
- Funding: Private & Public
- Status: Active
- Website: www.cancerbreakthroughs2020.org

Cancer Breakthroughs 2020, also known as Cancer Moonshot 2020, is a coalition with the goal of finding vaccine-based immunotherapies against cancer. By pooling the resources of multinational pharmaceutical, biotechnology companies, academic centers and oncologists, it intends to create access to over 60 novel and approved agents under exploration in the war against cancer and is expected to enable rapid testing of novel immunotherapy combination protocols. The initiative is being managed by a consortium of companies called The National Immunotherapy Coalition.

The difficulty of treating cancer has led researchers to develop more and more targeted drugs and immune therapies, with the future goal of hitting "cancers with several such treatments at once, much the way AIDS was tamed when researchers developed drugs to strike the virus at its vulnerable points." This new form of combination therapy is needed as cancer is heterogeneous and multiple methods are needed to target multiple types of cancer.

Some cancer specialists have expressed optimism that science has entered a "new era with the ability to rapidly determine the sequences of genes in tumor cells, searching for mutations that may be driving the cancer’s growth." Others call it "unrealistic".

== National Immunotherapy Coalition (NIC) ==
Cancer Breakthroughs 2020 is led by the National Immunotherapy Coalition (NIC), an initiative reportedly led by Los Angeles billionaire Patrick Soon-Shiong. Participating members include pharmaceutical companies Amgen and Celgene, biotech companies including NantWorks, NantKwest, Etubics, Altor BioScience, and Precision Biologics, a subsidiary of NantWorks, major academic cancer centers, community oncologists, health insurer Independence Blue Cross, and Bank of America, reportedly one of the largest self-insured companies in the U.S.

== Research scope ==
The scope of the project is to conduct dozens of small-scale clinical trials over the next few years in the field of immunotherapy, with as many as 20,000 patients. These trials are intended to be followed by larger trials. The project's goals will be considered met when long-lasting remission is achieved for cancer patients.

=== Themes pursued ===
Cancer Breakthroughs 2020 is pursuing immunotherapy and the following themes:

- Validation of Big Science: Complex science involving the human immune system and the validation of the safety and efficacy of combination therapy must be tested by reputable scientific enterprises in an unbiased manner without any prejudices other than the interest of the patient.
- Access to novel agents and approved drugs: One of the major challenges facing rapid progress in this field is that numerous pharmaceutical and biotech companies each have their own immunotherapeutic agents in the form of antibodies, immune cells, and vaccines in preclinical and clinical studies.
- FDA Regulation: Novel approaches for the adaptive combination of novel agents in this new paradigm where the combined multi-agents serve as a systems biological approach to the treatment of cancer.
- Care coordination and real-time monitoring of safety and outcomes with integration of complex molecular data, phenotypic data obtained from disparate electronic records.
- Ability to measure outcomes and cost in real time to enable payers to pay for value rather than procedures and establish an adaptive learning system for enhanced predictive modeling.
- Network Infrastructure: Highly secure bandwidth to transmit big data and interrogate complex molecular information in a large scale.

=== QUILT ===
Cancer Breakthroughs 2020 incorporates a concept called QUILT, which stands for QUantitative Integrative Lifelong Trial. QUILT is designed to leverage patients' immune systems, such as dendritic cell, T cell (lymphocyte) and natural killer cell (NK cell) therapies, and testing a variety of treatments including novel combinations of vaccines, cell-based immunotherapy, metronomic (regularly administered) chemotherapy, low dose radiotherapy and immunomodulators, as well as check point inhibitors, in patients who have undergone next generation whole genome, transcriptome and quantitative proteomic analysis.

== Related initiatives ==
=== Partnership for Accelerating Cancer Therapies ===
The Partnership for Accelerating Cancer Therapies (PACT) was announced in October 2017 as a collaboration between the National Institutes of Health and eleven pharmaceutical companies. This agreement provides $215 million in funding over the next five years. This initiative is mainly focused on immunotherapy.

The participating pharmaceutical companies, which have each agreed to contribute $1 million each year, include AbbVie, Amgen, Boehringer Ingelheim, Bristol-Myers Squibb, Celgene, Genentech, Gilead Sciences, GlaxoSmithKline, Janssen (Johnson & Johnson), Novartis, and Pfizer.

== Criticism ==
Critics said that the idea of curing cancer according to a Breakthroughs analogy was "entirely unrealistic", and cited President Richard Nixon's "failed" war on cancer. Cancer turned out to be not one disease, but hundreds, and the idea of curing cancer once and for all is "misleading and outdated".

The New York Times reported how Andrew von Eschenbach, director of the National Cancer Institute, announced in 2003 that his goal was to “eliminate suffering and death” caused by cancer by 2015. During an appropriations hearing, Senator Arlen Specter (R-PA) asked von Eschenbach what it would take to move the date up to 2010. Von Eschenbach said he could do it with a proposed budget of $600 million a year. Specter died of cancer in 2012.

Health oriented news website STAT News published an editorial criticizing Cancer Breakthroughs as a program that is designed to support Soon-Shiong's companies while making little progress to cure cancer. The article stated, "At its core, the initiative appears to be an elaborate marketing tool for Soon-Shiong — a way to promote his pricey new cancer diagnostic tool at a time when he badly needs a business success, as his publicly-traded companies are losing tens of millions per quarter."

The budget for Cancer Breakthroughs 2020 is undisclosed.
