= 2018 State of the Union Address =

Speech by US President Donald Trump

- Full video of the speech as published by the White House
- Date: January 30, 2018
- Time: 9:00 p.m. EST
- Duration: 1 hour, 20 minutes
- Venue: House Chamber, United States Capitol
- Location: Washington, D.C.; 38°53′19.8″N 77°00′32.8″W
- Type: State of the Union Address
- Participants: Donald Trump; Mike Pence; Paul Ryan
- Footage: C-SPAN
- Previous: 2017 Joint session speech
- Next: 2019 State of the Union Address
- Website: Full text by archives.gov

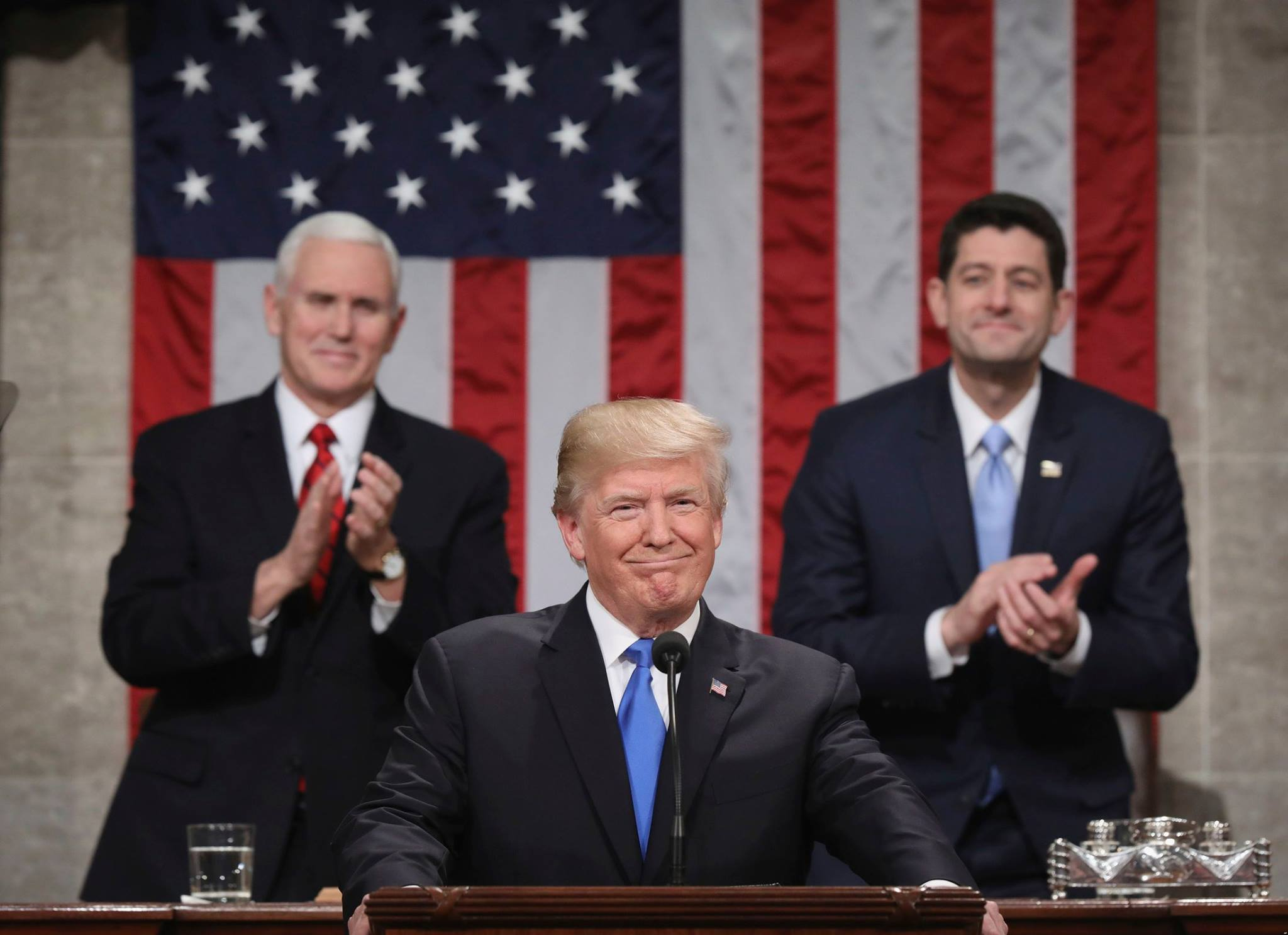
President Trump delivering the State of the Union address to the U.S. Congress

Donald Trump, the 45th president of the United States, delivered a State of the Union address on January 30, 2018, at 9:00 p.m. EST, in the chamber of the United States House of Representatives to the 115th United States Congress. It was Trump's first State of the Union Address and his second speech to a joint session of the United States Congress during his first term. Presiding over this joint session was the House speaker, Paul Ryan, accompanied by Mike Pence, the vice president, in his capacity as the president of the Senate.

The Address was watched by 45.6 million viewers. There were also 21 million interactions regarding the address on social media.

U.S. Representative Joe Kennedy III and Virginia Delegate Elizabeth Guzmán gave the Democratic Party's response in English and Spanish, respectively.

== Background ==
Article II, Section 3, Clause 1 of the United States Constitution states that the president "shall from time to time give to the Congress Information of the State of the Union, and recommend to their Consideration such measures as he shall judge necessary and expedient." On November 30, 2017, Speaker of the House Paul Ryan sent an invitation to the president to deliver a "State of the Union address before a joint session of Congress on January 30, 2018, in the House Chamber." The speech was Trump's first State of the Union address and his second speech to a joint session of Congress.

On January 26, 2018, a senior administration official told reporters that "the tone [of the address] will be one of bipartisanship and it will be very forward looking." The official said that the theme of Trump's speech would be "building a safe, strong, and proud America." Five major policy issues were discussed by the president: the economy, infrastructure, immigration, trade, and national security. More specifically, Trump touted the Tax Cuts and Jobs Act of 2017 and echoed his campaign call for "fair" and "reciprocal" trade deals.

Senior policy adviser Stephen Miller and staff secretary Rob Porter took the lead in writing the speech. The full draft of the speech was completed two weeks before the State of the Union Address, but it was still being edited with reviews and suggestions from Cabinet secretaries and senior White House aides. National Security Advisor H. R. McMaster, Secretary of State Rex Tillerson, and Secretary of Defense Jim Mattis offered feedback on the national security portion of the speech.

== Contents and delivery ==
=== Taxation ===
A significant portion of the scripted speech was dedicated to the tax package passed in December, which Trump labeled as the largest tax reform bill in U.S. history.

=== Economy and employment ===
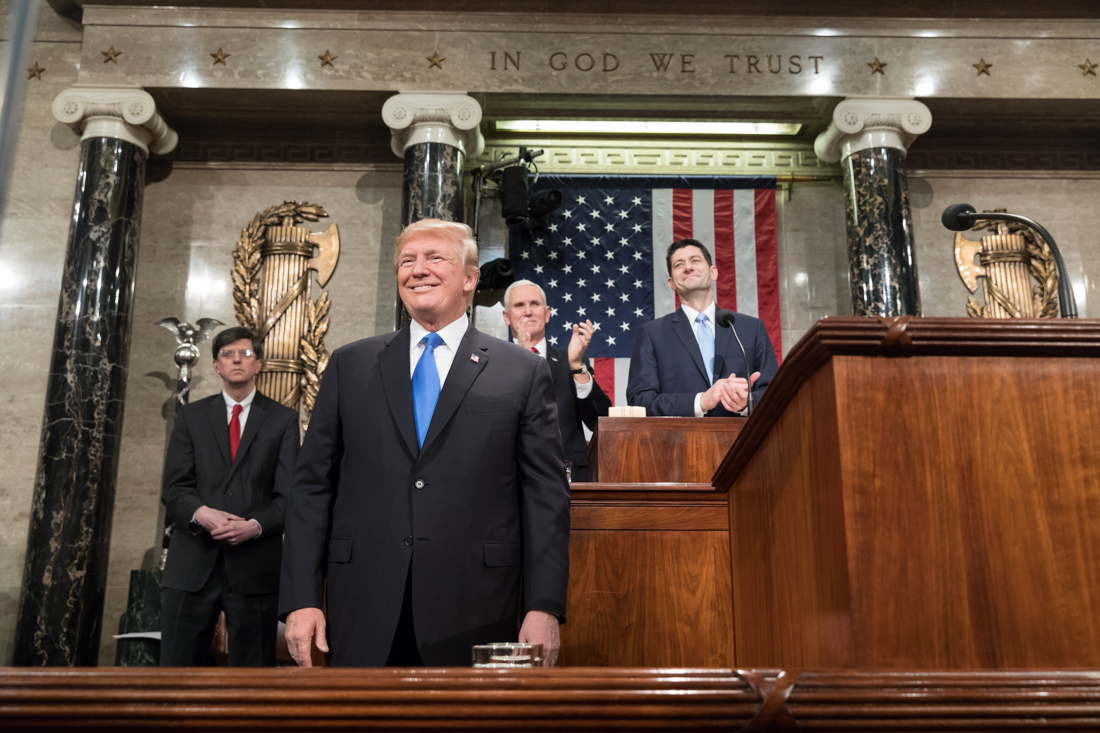
Trump next to the podium prior to delivering the speech

The speech also focused on the economic successes of the first year of the presidency. Trump highlighted the creation of new jobs, specifically 200,000 manufacturing jobs. To support this claim, Trump pointed to invited guests from Staub Manufacturing in Dayton, Ohio, a business that has seen their greatest earnings since starting their business 20 years ago. The president also reiterated a 45-year low in unemployment, with the lowest rate of African-American and Hispanic unemployment ever recorded.

=== Infrastructure ===
Trump called on Congress to support a plan to spend $1.5 trillion on rebuilding infrastructure across the country. His speech reflected on the building of the Empire State Building, claiming that it was built in one year while current regulations delay construction of some roads by 10 years. Trump concluded by declaring "we will rebuild infrastructure with American heart, American hands and American grit.”

=== Immigration ===
Much of the State of the Union came in the form of general policy goals. This was especially the case for the issue of immigration. Trump used personal accounts in order to support his pitch for an overhaul in the U.S. immigration system. Two Long Island families, both of whom had children who were killed by a member of the MS-13 gang, a group with ties to Central America, were used to highlight the need to close “glaring loopholes” in the immigration system. An Immigration and Customs Enforcement officer's fight with MS-13 was used as an example for greater border security. After listing the perceived dangers of the current immigration system, Trump gave “four pillars” of what he sees as the ideal path forward. He offered a broad framework that includes an eventual pathway to citizenship for “Dreamers” that will take 12 years and increased border security, two tenets of the current budget negotiations between Democrats and the White House. Trump repeated his desire to move away from the visa-lottery system, and towards a more merit-based system, which will likely prioritize foreigners with a higher-level of education and wealth. The fourth pillar was to end what has become known as chain migration, the practice of prioritizing the family members of immigrants who are already state-side.

=== Foreign policy ===
In a nod to foreign policy and recent provocations against North Korea's nuclear ambitions, the speech also said that “as part of our defense, we must modernize and rebuild our nuclear arsenal, hopefully never having to use it, but making it so strong and powerful that it will deter any acts of aggression.”

Much of the foreign policy portion of the speech criticized North Korea over human rights. Trump introduced both the parents of Otto Warmbier, the American university student who returned to the U.S. in a coma and eventually died following a long detention in North Korea, as well as Ji Seong-ho, an amputee who escaped North Korea as a child after being tortured by authorities.

=== Healthcare ===
In an aim to repeal and replace the Affordable Care Act, Trump highlighted the GOP's action in repealing the individual mandate as part of their tax overhaul. He also shared that the FDA had approved more drugs in 2017 than in any year prior. Additionally, his speech covered his administration's goal to give veterans choice for their healthcare, as well as allowing patients with terminal illnesses to get access to experimental treatments.

Trump emphasized that one of his top priorities in 2018 is to reduce the price of prescription drugs, citing that drugs in other countries cost far less than the same drugs in the United States.

== Address ==
The State of the Union Address was given at 9 pm EST on January 30, 2018. Distribution of the tickets for the event was delayed because the first printing of the tickets misspelled the event as the "State of the Uniom".

John Roberts, the Chief Justice of the United States, and Associate Justices Stephen Breyer, Elena Kagan, and Neil Gorsuch were the only justices of the Supreme Court of the United States in attendance for the speech. The other five justices were absent. Supreme Court Justice Ruth Bader Ginsburg did not attend the address to participate in a "fireside chat" at Roger Williams University School of Law with U.S. Circuit Judge Bruce M. Selya, which was scheduled in August 2017.

U.S. Secretary of Agriculture Sonny Perdue was named the designated survivor and was at an undisclosed location during the address so that, in case of a catastrophe, the continuity of government was upheld.

== Protests ==
A group of female Democratic members of Congress wore black outfits to the address in solidarity with movements protesting sexual harassment and assault in numerous industries. Members of the Congressional Black Caucus (CBC) wore red pins to honor Recy Taylor, a black woman who was gang raped by six white men in 1944.

=== Democratic boycotts ===
On January 5, 2018, U.S. Representative Earl Blumenauer announced that he would be in his district rather than attend the State of the Union Address. In light of reporting that Trump called Haiti, El Salvador, and several nations in Africa "shithole countries", Representative John Lewis announced on January 12 that he was not planning on attending the address. Joining Lewis in the boycott, Representative Maxine Waters said, "[Trump] does not deserve my attention." Representative Frederica Wilson became the fourth member of Congress to boycott the address on January 14, calling Trump a racist and liar. On January 15, Representative Pramila Jayapal announced she too was boycotting the address because of "racism and hatred" from Trump. On January 17, CBC chairman Cedric Richmond said that the group was pondering a potential boycott or demonstration of the address. The press secretary of Representative Barbara Lee said she would not attend the address, which was decided before Trump's disparaging remarks were reported.

On January 26, Representative Jan Schakowsky announced she was not going to attend the address, citing the travel ban, Trump's response to the violence at the Unite the Right rally, and his use of vulgar language to refer to African nations as reasons for her boycott. Representative Gregory Meeks announced on January 28 that he would be boycotting, saying, "I cannot give this man, who does not respect me, the respect to be in that audience." The spokesperson for Representative Albio Sires said, "The congressman is not attending the State of the Union because many of his constituents are offended by the president's rhetoric and behavior." On January 29, Representatives Bobby Rush and Danny Davis announced they were boycotting the address.

=== Counter-programming ===
==== People's State of the Union ====
Actor Mark Ruffalo, other stars, and members of "the resistance movement" hosted a "People's State of the Union" on January 29, saying, "In essence, it's a better reflection of our state of the union based on a more populist point of view, based on the people's point of view. I think it's important because we have a president who has a difficult time with the truth, who has a radical, divisive agenda, and spends an enormous amount of time focusing on the negative and hopelessness and despair." The event was held on January 29, 2018, at The Town Hall in New York City. Attendees included Bill de Blasio, John Leguizamo, Michael Moore, Cynthia Nixon, Rosie Perez, Mark Ruffalo, and Gloria Steinem, and performers included Andra Day, Common, and Rufus Wainwright. "We Stand United" was the lead organizer, and additional support was provided by MoveOn.org Political Action and Stand Up America.

==== State of the Dream ====
On January 25, actress Alyssa Milano announced that she would host counter-programming called "State of the Dream", which would solicit and present brief videos from Americans describing their dreams for the country that would be posted on Twitter and other social media simultaneously while Trump is giving his address.

== Notable invitations ==
=== White House ===
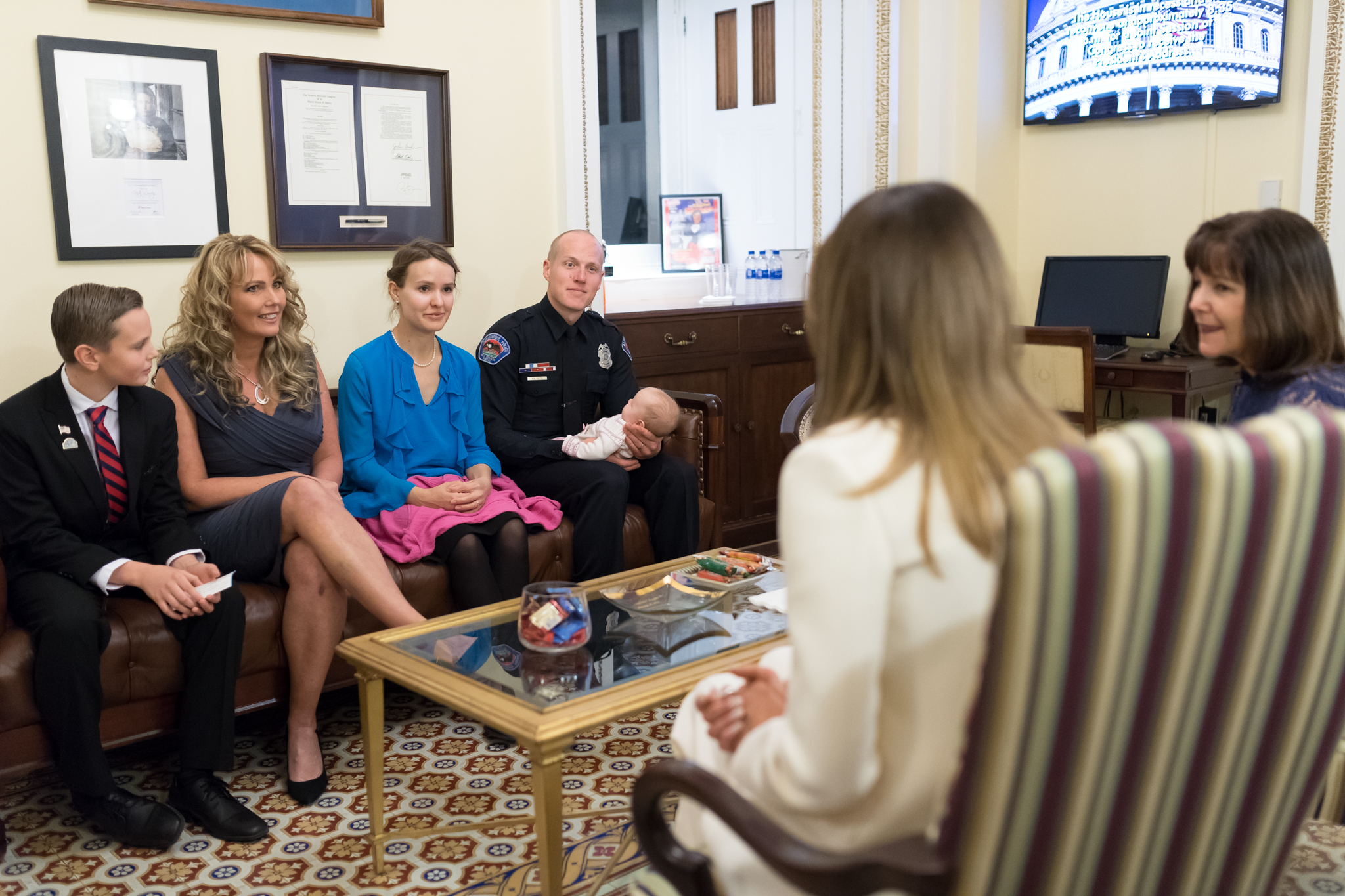
Melania Trump and Karen Pence with invited guests prior to the address

Along with First Lady Melania Trump, the White House invited certain people affected by the issues that the president will address in his speech. On January 28, 2018, the mother of Kayla Cuevas, who was murdered on Long Island in 2016 by MS-13 gang members, said the White House invited her to attend the State of the Union Address. White House Press Secretary Sarah Huckabee Sanders named several people on January 29 who would attend the address. Among those who were named was a police officer who adopted a baby born to a homeless woman addicted to heroin. Ji Seong-ho, a North Korean defector was invited to the address.

=== Republican ===
On January 17, U.S. Representative Sean Duffy invited U.S. Army veteran Ricky Taylor, better known by his Twitter username as "Deplorable Vet", to be his guest at the address after Taylor sought to take Maxine Waters' unused seats. Representative Jim Bridenstine, who was nominated by Trump to be NASA administrator, invited Bill Nye on January 18 to be his guest at the address. On January 24, U.S. Senator John Hoeven announced that Miss America Cara Mund was his guest at the address. Representative Kevin Cramer invited Tommy Fisher, a corporate executive whose company was given a contract to develop a prototype for construction of a wall along the U.S. border with Mexico, to attend the address. On January 26, Representative Carlos Curbelo announced he was inviting a recipient of the Deferred Action for Childhood Arrivals program. Representative Kevin Yoder announced on January 27 that he was inviting the widow of Srinivas Kuchibhotla, an Indian immigrant who was killed in the 2017 Olathe, Kansas shooting. Representative Rodney Davis invited Jayson Werth, a baseball player, who has owned and managed an organic farm in Davis' district since 2009 and has advocated in support of organic farmers.

=== Democratic ===
House Minority Leader Nancy Pelosi and several other Democratic members of Congress said they would be inviting DREAMers and other immigrants to the address. Representative Debbie Dingell announced on January 18 that she was inviting Cindy Garcia, whose husband was deported to Mexico after spending nearly three decades living and raising a family in Michigan, to the address. Several House Democrats invited members of the #MeToo and Time's Up movements to attend the address. Representatives Jackie Speier, Bonnie Watson Coleman, and Suzan DelBene respectively invited Fatima Goss Graves, the president and CEO of the National Women's Law Center; the niece of Recy Taylor; and Kristin Rowe-Finkbeiner to be their guests.

On January 25, Representative Mark Pocan invited U.S. House candidate Randy Bryce, who is challenging Paul Ryan in the 2018 midterm elections, to the address. Representative Robin Kelly invited Illinois Attorney General candidate Kwame Raoul to attend the address, saying, "As a first-generation Haitian American, his presence and voice at the State of the Union is greatly needed, especially in light of the president's recent racist and derogatory comments about Haiti and other nations." On January 26, Senator Richard Blumenthal invited a survivor of child sex trafficking to the address. On January 27, Representative Val Demings invited a first responder to the Orlando nightclub shooting to the address. Senator Jeanne Shaheen invited to the address a woman whose son died of drug overdose.

Senator Kirsten Gillibrand invited San Juan mayor Carmen Yulín Cruz on January 29 to attend the address. On Twitter, Gillibrand wrote, "Throughout the crisis in Puerto Rico, Mayor Cruz has shown extraordinary leadership and fearless advocacy for her city. I hope Mayor Cruz's presence at #SOTU will remind the president and my colleagues in Congress of our urgent responsibility to help Puerto Rico fully recover and rebuild. Our fellow citizens must not be forgotten or left behind."

== Responses ==
=== Democratic Party ===
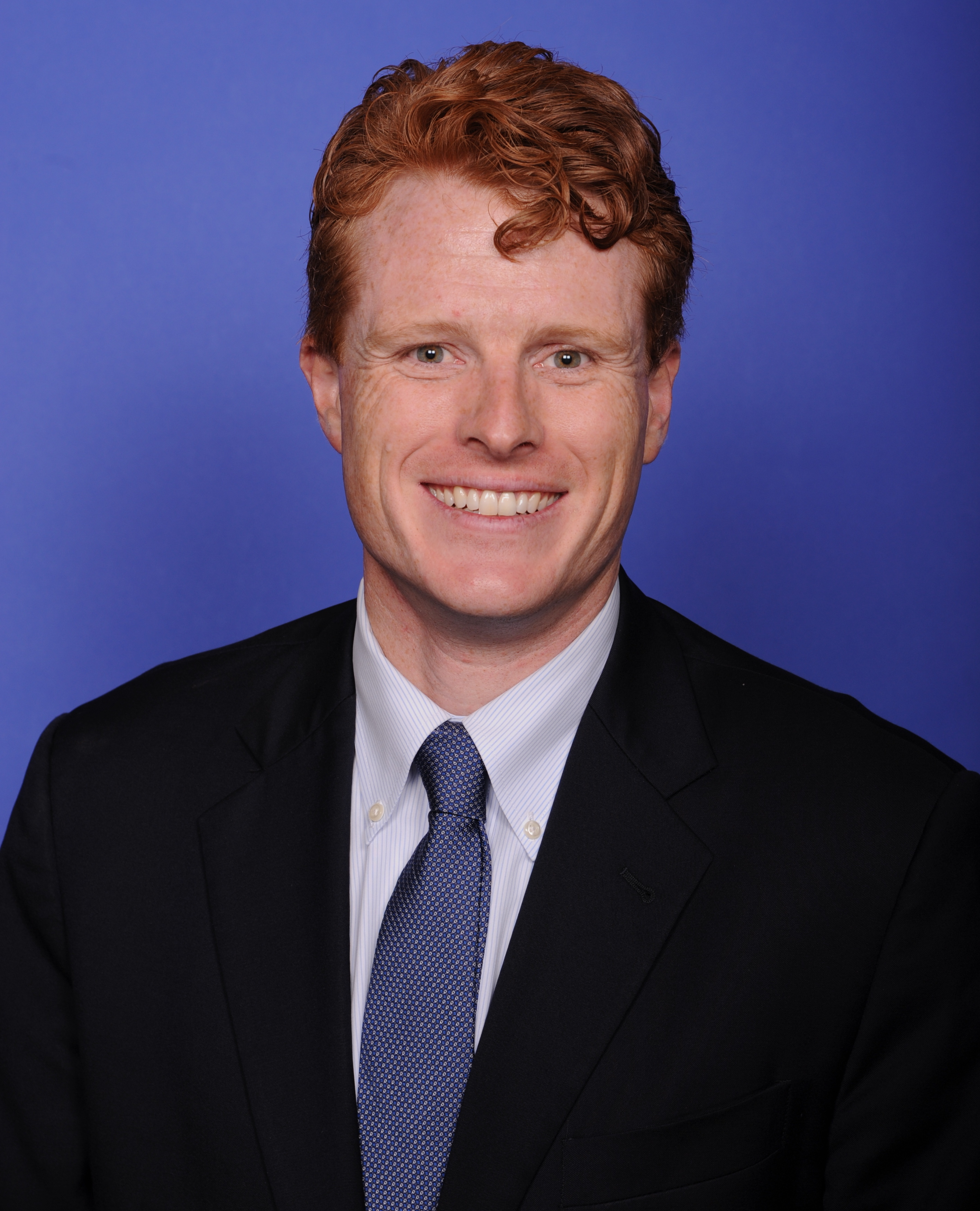
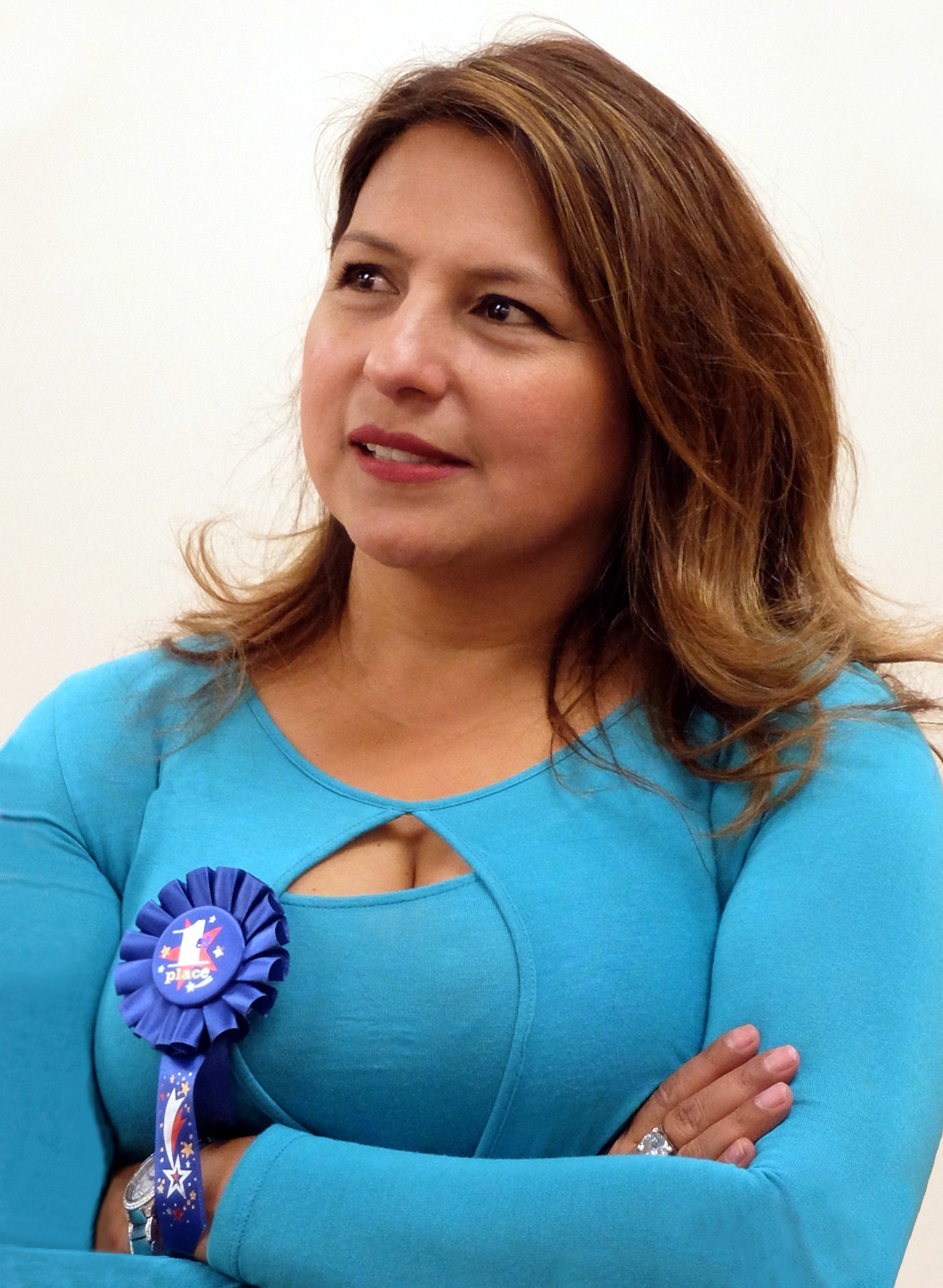
U.S. Representative Joe Kennedy III and Virginia Delegate Elizabeth Guzmán gave Democratic response speeches.

On January 25, 2018, it was announced that U.S. Representative Joe Kennedy III would give the Democratic response to the State of the Union Address and the Spanish language response would be given by Virginia Delegate Elizabeth Guzmán, who became the first Hispanic female immigrant elected to the Virginia House of Delegates. Nancy Pelosi said, "Congressman Kennedy profoundly understands the challenges facing hardworking men and women across the country." Senate Minority Leader Chuck Schumer said, "In their responses to the President's address, Congressman Kennedy and Virginia Delegate Guzmán will both do an excellent job in making clear that Democrats are laser-focused on enacting policies to benefit middle class Americans, not special interests or the wealthiest."

Kennedy said he was honored to be chosen to give the Democratic response, saying, "From health care to economic justice, to civil rights, the Democratic agenda stands in powerful contrast to President Trump's broken promises to American families." In a statement, Guzmán also said she was honored and added, "Through his rhetoric and policies, the president has marginalized members of my community who are simply trying to work hard and support their families. I look forward to standing up for all working people on Tuesday."

The selection of Kennedy to give the Democratic response came after criticism that the Democratic Party relied too heavily on its oldest leaders since the 2016 presidential election. In choosing Kennedy, the party is trying to bridge the gap with a new face attached to one of the most famous names in American politics. Joe Kennedy III is the second member of his family to give the Democratic response after his great uncle Ted Kennedy gave one to the 1982 State of the Union Address.

It was announced on January 29 that Kennedy would be giving the Democratic response from Diman Regional Vocational Technical High School in Fall River, Massachusetts.

=== Libertarian Party ===
Nicholas Sarwark, the chairman of the Libertarian National Committee, gave the Libertarian Party response to the State of the Union Address. Additionally, Libertarian 2020 presidential candidate Adam Kokesh gave a response to the State of the Union address.

=== Green Party ===
On January 25, 2018, the Green Party issued a press release stating that it would stream an online response to the State of the Union Address, featuring Jill Stein and Ajamu Baraka, the 2016 presidential and vice presidential nominees respectively.

=== Other ===
It was announced on January 26, 2018, that Maxine Waters would be on the BET program, Angela Rye's State of the Union, after the State of the Union Address to address the country. On January 29, the office of Senator Bernie Sanders, an independent, announced that he would be giving his own response to the address.

== Coverage ==
The State of the Union Address was televised on all the major U.S. broadcast and cable television networks. Facebook and Twitter streamed the address online. Nine media outlets (ABC News, CBS News, NBC News, Bloomberg News, The New York Times, The Washington Post, Telemundo, Univision, and C-SPAN) and the White House would provide ten separate livestreams of the address on YouTube.

On January 24, NBC News announced that it would begin its coverage of the address at 9 pm EST, with NBC Nightly News anchor Lester Holt leading it. Holt was joined by Today co-anchor Savannah Guthrie, Meet the Press moderator Chuck Todd, Megyn Kelly Today anchor Megyn Kelly, special correspondent Tom Brokaw, and chief foreign affairs correspondent Andrea Mitchell. Starting at 8 pm EST, NBC News will also be livestreaming the event on YouTube and NBCNews.com with national political correspondent Steve Kornacki and correspondent Katy Tur. On January 26, CBS News announced it was beginning its coverage at 9 pm EST, but CBSN would start streaming its coverage of the event at 5 pm EST. CNN stated that it would start its coverage at 7 pm EST and stream on CNNgo. Fox News announced on January 28 that it would begin coverage at 9 pm EST with Bret Baier and Martha MacCallum.

=== Viewership ===
Across twelve broadcast and cable television networks, 45.8 million viewers watched the speech. The address was the most-tweeted of its kind with a record total of 4.5 million tweets, surpassing the former record of 3 million tweets, set during Trump's 2017 joint session address—which was broken less than an hour into the 2018 address.

Total cable and network viewers

| Network | Viewers |
|---|---|
| FNC | 11,705,000 |
| NBC | 7,055,000 |
| CBS | 6,990,000 |
| ABC | 5,400,000 |
| Fox | 3,600,000 |
| CNN | 3,111,000 |
| MSNBC | 2,674,000 |

Broadcast news channels

Network news channels

== Reactions ==
=== Fact checkers ===
FactCheck.org stated, "The president exaggerates his accomplishments in his address to Congress." PolitiFact assessed one true, three mostly true, two half true, four mostly false, and two false statements.

On February 1, Trump said that viewership of his address was "the highest number in history", but there were five addresses given by his three predecessors Bill Clinton, George W. Bush, and Barack Obama that had higher viewership.

=== Late-night talk shows ===
Comedy Central's The Daily Show with Trevor Noah and The Opposition with Jordan Klepper were aired live to offer instant analysis and commentary on the State of the Union Address. Both shows planned to simulcast the first segment of their live episodes via Facebook Live. CBS also aired a live edition of The Late Show with Stephen Colbert.

=== Politicians ===
Alex Seitz-Wald of NBC News described that during the address, "many Democrats showed how little stock they put in Trump's calls for cooperation by staying seated during rhetoric that would have prompted bipartisan applause if it came from almost any other president." Representative Seth Moulton asked on Twitter if people believed that Trump would follow through on infrastructure. Senator and former 2016 vice presidential nominee Tim Kaine offered advice on what would have convinced Democrats that Trump was serious about cooperation. In a statement, Representative Adam Schiff said, "Tonight, the president showered law enforcement with praise, even as he and his congressional allies launch an all out attack on the FBI, the pre-eminent federal law enforcement agency." Senators Doug Jones and Joe Manchin were the only Democrats showing consistent support for Trump.

=== Public opinion ===
In a CBS News poll, 42 percent of respondents who watched the State of the Union Address identified themselves as Republicans, 33 percent as Independents, and 25 percent as Democrats. 75 percent of those who were polled approved of the speech. A CNN poll of viewers determined that 48 percent of viewers had a very positive impression of the speech and 22 percent had a somewhat positive impression, which was the lowest net positive rating since CNN first began asking the question in 1998.

== See also ==
- List of joint sessions of the United States Congress
- Timeline of the first Trump presidency (2018 Q1)

| Preceded by 2017 joint session speech | State of the Union addresses 2018 | Succeeded by 2019 State of the Union Address |
