= 2017 Donald Trump speech to a joint session of Congress =

Speech by US President Donald Trump

- Full video of the speech as published by the White House
- Date: February 28, 2017
- Time: 9:00 p.m. EST
- Duration: 1 hour
- Venue: House Chamber, United States Capitol
- Location: Washington, D.C.; 38°53′19.8″N 77°00′32.8″W
- Type: Unofficial State of the Union Address
- Participants: Donald Trump; Mike Pence; Paul Ryan
- Footage: C-SPAN
- Previous: 2016 State of the Union Address
- Next: 2018 State of the Union Address
- Website: Full text by archives.gov

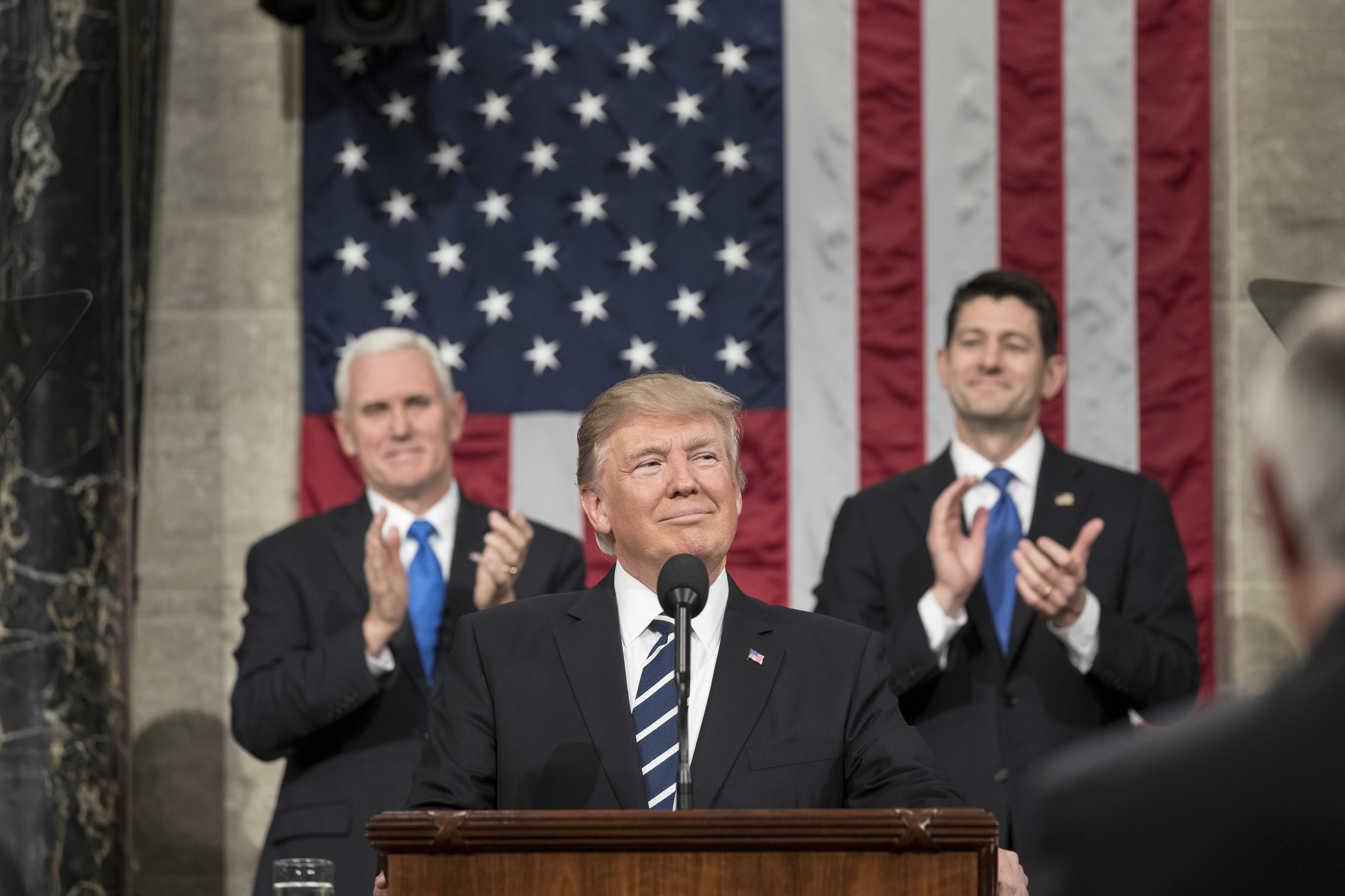
President Donald Trump addressing the Congress, with Vice President Mike Pence and House Speaker Paul Ryan

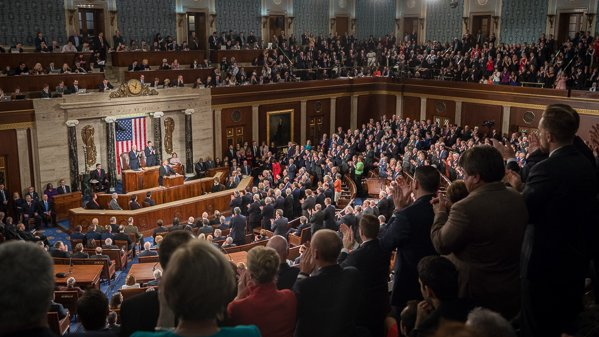
View from the Executive Gallery of the House Chamber

Donald Trump, the 45th president of the United States, addressed a joint session of the United States Congress on February 28, 2017. It was his first public address before a joint session during his first term. Like a State of the Union Address, it was delivered before the 115th United States Congress in the Chamber of the House of Representatives in the United States Capitol. Presiding over this joint session was the House speaker, Paul Ryan, accompanied by Mike Pence, the vice president in his capacity as the president of the Senate.

== Reception ==
Fact-checkers noted that although Trump's speech to Congress had "fewer untrue statements than many of his remarks", the address nevertheless included numerous false and misleading statements on a variety of issues, including the federal budget, immigration and crime, immigration and the economy, welfare, and the job impact of the Keystone XL and Dakota Access Pipelines.

The speech was considered more optimistic, conciliatory and politically conventional and "presidential" than Trump's typically populist manner of speaking, at a time in which he was receiving historically low approval ratings. President Trump’s approval rating was 53% on February 24, 2017, according to Rasmussen Reports - Presidential Daily Poll.

== Speech ==
President Trump announced the creation of the Office of Victims of Immigration Crime Engagement (VOICE) in the United States Department of Homeland Security.

Veterans Affairs Secretary David Shulkin was the designated survivor and did not attend the address in order to maintain a continuity of government. He was sequestered at a secret secure location for the duration of the event.

== Democratic responses ==
For the Democratic Party, former Kentucky Governor Steve Beshear provided the response; activist Astrid Silva of Nevada offered another response for the party in Spanish. Beshear spoke at a diner in Lexington, Kentucky.

Senator Bernie Sanders of Vermont (an independent who caucuses with the Democrats in the Senate) responded to the speech in a 14-minute video posted to Facebook, in which he criticized Trump for failing to make any mention of income inequality, criminal justice reform, or climate change. Sanders also stated: "President Trump once again made it clear he plans on working with Republicans in Congress who want to repeal the Affordable Care Act, throw 20 million Americans off of health insurance, privatize Medicare, make massive cuts in Medicaid, raise the cost of prescription drugs to seniors, eliminate funding for Planned Parenthood, while at the same time, he wants to give another massive tax break to the wealthiest Americans."

According to the Democratic think-tank Center for American Progress, Trump made 51 false or manipulative statements during his speech.

== TV Viewership ==
Trump's speech was aired live on 11 broadcast and cable news networks, and viewed on TV by an estimated 47.7 million people in the United States with millions more streaming online through various sources including social media.

Total cable and network viewers

Network	Viewers
FNC	10,765,000
NBC	9,144,000
CBS	7,156,000
ABC	6,065,000
CNN	3,944,000
Fox	3,076,000
MSNBC	2,683,000

Broadcast networks Cable news networks

== See also ==
- First 100 days of the first Trump presidency – Period from January to April 2017
- List of joint sessions of the United States Congress
- Timeline of the first Trump presidency (2017 Q1)

Preceded by 2016 State of the Union Address	State of the Union addresses 2017 joint session speech	Succeeded by 2018 State of the Union Address
