= Timeline of the Ronald Reagan presidency (1981) =

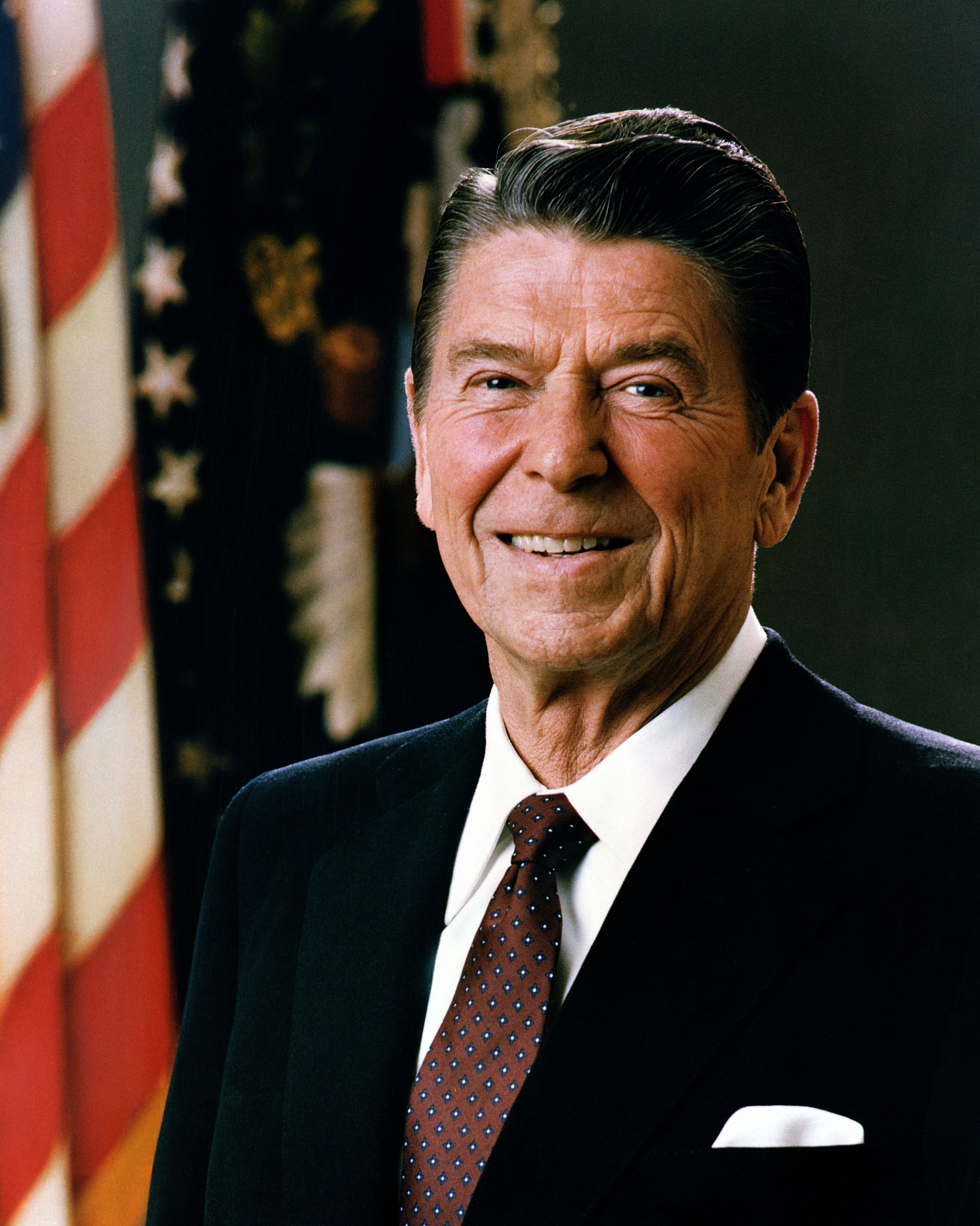
Reagan in 1961

The following is a timeline of Ronald Reagan's presidency from his inauguration as the 40th president of the United States on January 20, 1981, to December 31, 1981.

== January ==
- January 20 – Ronald Reagan's presidency begins with his inauguration at the United States Capitol in Washington, D.C.; the oath of office is administered by Chief Justice Warren E. Burger. The Iran hostage crisis ends minutes after the swearing-in with the release of the 52 Americans held hostage for the past 444 days. Reagan is notified of the release in his first presidential national security briefing and announces the release during a luncheon following his inauguration on Capitol Hill. Reagan, in his first official act as President and less than an hour after being sworn-in, imposes a hiring freeze. President Reagan says that the freeze will inevitably lead to the reduction of a notable quantity in the federal work force, and that he will permit rare exemptions when vital to maintaining services.
- January 21 – The cabinet of the Reagan administration meets for the first time officially. During the meeting, President Reagan declares that his priorities will be the reduction of the government's size, and controlling the federal budget. President Reagan attends the swearing-in of 39 senior White House aides; President Reagan tells the aides to make decisions with the intent of what is good for Americans instead of what may land another position for them. President Reagan speaks with former President Jimmy Carter, ahead of the latter arriving in West Germany. Reagan administration officials state there will be several days' worth of examinations made on the negotiations of the Iran hostage crisis.
- January 22 – President Reagan releases a memo to federal government and agency heads ordering a travel reduction by 15%, an outside professional services cut by 5%, and a furniture and other equipment purchase moratorium. Alexander Haig is sworn in as the 59th United States Secretary of State.
- January 23 – James Edwards is sworn in as the third United States Secretary of Energy.
- January 25 – President Reagan spends an hour meeting with families of hostages in the Iran hostage crisis, not permitting television or radio coverage. Reagan addresses the families and denies he will be attending the reunion of the hostages and their family members: "You don't need any outsiders. This is a moment for you and them."
- January 28 – Secretary of Energy Edwards tells reporters that he doubts the prices of gas will be increased much by the immediate deconstruction, though concedes prices could increase by 3 to 5 cents per gallon.
- January 29 – President Reagan holds his first presidential press conference, during which he critiques the Soviet Union as having leaders that "reserve the right to commit any crime, to lie, to cheat" in a sought revolution.
- January 30 – The White House announces that President Reagan has placed the entirety of his assets barring his two homes into a blind trust for the purpose of avoiding financial compensation for his choices during his tenure in office. Though State Department official William J. Dyess does not confirm the existence of a letter by Secretary of State Haig warning the Soviet Union intervention in Poland could strain its relations with the US, another official validates.

== February ==
- February 1 – White House Chief of Staff James Baker says the Reagan administration inherited the worst economy in 50 years, that it will be the number one "priority of the administration" and that President Reagan will explain the economy in a televised speech in four days during an appearance on Face the Nation. The Soviet press accuse President Reagan of a "lies and hypocrisy" campaign regarding terrorist support from Kremlin.
- February 2 – President Reagan is interviewed by five publications in the Oval Office, asserting the Carter administration was wrong for negotiating with Iran during the hostage crisis. Sources report President Reagan is considering 1982's fiscal year having a budget cut of between 30 and 40 million.
- February 3 – Raymond Donovan is confirmed as United States Secretary of Labor. Secretary of Defense Weinberger holds the first news conference at the Pentagon since taking office, stating his consideration of the deployment of the nuclear warhead.
- February 4 – President Reagan announces the nomination of Seeley Lodwick to be Under Secretary of Agriculture for International Affairs and Commodity Program and the appointments of Stephen M. Studdert as Special Assistant to the President and Director of the Advance Office and Robert B. Carleson as Special Assistant to the President for Policy Development.
- February 5 – President Reagan has a televised address, saying in part that the US is in risk of "economic calamity" that can only be prevented with Congress adopting the administration's tax and spending cuts as well as regulatory reform.
- February 6 – The Senate approves a bill by President Reagan giving federal borrowing a raise by US$985 billion.
- February 7 – President Reagan issues a memorandum on the budget for the 1982 fiscal year.
- February 9 – Secretary of Transportation Lewis chooses to seek a one-year postponing of the passenger restraint rule.
- February 10 – Department of Justice officials detail policies that will be implemented with the passing of a legislative proposal including a tighter bail law, forming new ways to help crime victims, and federal jurisdictions being developed over crimes that are traditionally handled by authorities of the state.
- February 11 – Chief State Department spokesman William Dyess reports that the Reagan administration is "deeply concerned" with news that Israel wanting to make new settlements by closing off land on the West Bank. White House officials say the Reagan administration is composing a proposal shifting states to being responsible for the majority of funding for welfare, housing, healthcare, and food programs instead of the federal government.
- February 18 – President Reagan delivers an address before a joint session of the members of Congress outlining his administration goals.
- February 23 – President Reagan nominates Emanuel S. Savas for Assistant Secretary of Housing and Urban Development.
- February 24 – President Reagan reports the response to the economic program of the administration has been "enormously endearing" and answers questions during a White House briefing. President Reagan sends a message to Congress calling for their adherence to the Fishery Conservation and Management Act of 1976 and the agreement between the US and Norway on international fishery.
- February 26 – President Reagan sends a letter to Administrator of Veteran Affairs Max Cleland in acceptance of the latter's resignation.
- February 27 – President Reagan announces his appointment of Wendy H. Borcherdt for Associate Director of Presidential Personnel.
- February 28 – President Reagan nominates Gerald P. Carmen for Administrator of General Services.

== March ==
- March 3 – President Reagan announces he does not believe there will be a need to send American troops into El Salvador and vows the continued pursuit of diplomacy to ensure the US does not stop involvement and allow "this hemisphere to be invaded by outside forces."
- March 5 – President Reagan says the federal government will contribute US$1 million to Atlanta in response to the 21 black children that either disappeared or were murdered. The House Budget Committee charges President Reagan with having overlooked misused dollars numbering in the billions that need to be eliminated ahead of Congress doing so to programs that are of worth.
- March 6 – President Reagan announces his intent for a federal payroll reduction of 63,000 employees by the end of 1983.
- March 9 – President Reagan signs a budget cut package in the Rose Garden of the White House. The package includes 300 federal programs to reduce government spending by US$6.4 billion and the fiscal year 1982's spending by US$48.6 billion.
- March 14 – President Reagan gives an address in New York City in the early afternoon. Reagan gives a public statement on the Westway Highway Project.
- March 16 – President Reagan gives a public statement on St. Patrick's Day. President Reagan gives an address to Associated General Contractors of America members during a reception appearance.
- March 17 – President Reagan speaks at the National Association of State Departments of Agriculture Dinner.
- March 18 – Secretary of State Haig says Central America is in the process of being aimed for takeover by the world communist movement.
- March 19 – Reagan administration sources report will send a "mild signal" requesting Japan voluntarily do away with their automobile exports.
- March 20 – President Reagan gives a speech at the Conservative Political Action Conference Dinner in the Grand Ballroom at the Mayflower Hotel in the evening hours.
- March 21 – President Reagan speaks briefly at the East Room Reception for Performers in and Sponsors of the Ford's Theatre Benefit Gala in the afternoon.
- March 23 – President Reagan sends a message to Congress in regards to the impact of new military facilities in communities.
- March 24 – Press Secretary James Brady reports that President Reagan has chosen to have Vice President George H. W. Bush chair the crisis management team of the administration.
- March 26 – In the later hours of the day, the Reagan administration states the possible intervention of the Soviet Union in the upcoming labor strike in Poland.
- March 27 – Secretary of State Haig says there is a "very dangerous" situation in Poland, predicting the weekend may be important, and that the US is considering giving further aid to Poland during a breakfast with reporters.
- March 28 – President Reagan announces the nominations of Antonio Monroig for Assistant Secretary of Housing and Urban Development, William A. Niskanen, Jr. for membership on the Council of Economic Advisers, James G. Watt for Chairman of the Water Resources Council, and Alex Kozinski for Special Counsel of the Merit Systems Protection Board.
- March 29 – Secretary of State Haig says that he is optimistic that Poland will avoid a major crisis due to moderate influence but notes "the situation is still very, very tense."
- March 30 – President Reagan is wounded, alongside three others, in an assassination attempt.
- March 31 – President Reagan resumes his official duties. He meets with Vice President Bush and three top aides from the White House. During breakfast, Reagan signs a bill supporting dairy-price. Vice President Bush says to reporters that he has briefly met with President Reagan and reports the latter's condition as "very well."

== April ==
- April 1 – In response to the assassination attempt, the Illinois State Senate approves a bill outlawing handguns being sold or possessed, with offenders of the law being eligible to six years of prison if convicted.
- April 2 – Secretary of Defense Weinberger says steps being taken by the US are the direct result of the Soviet Union taking steps to increase the chances of its Poland invasion.
- April 3 – President Reagan has his temperature increase to 102 degrees before dropping to an almost normal degree. Benjamin Aaron describes it as a setback though a regular continuation of his injuries from the assassination attempt.
- April 4 – Egyptian and Western sources say Secretary of State Haig has told his Egyptian hosts that he could have prematurely ceased his Mideast trip due to Poland having increased in tension.
- April 5 – President Reagan meets with Vernon Jordan. President Reagan is reported to have run an intermittent temperature during the day and in his injured lung, doctors are said to have found particle traces.
- April 7 – The House Budget Committee rejects the Reagan administration's budget proposal in favor of an alternative by Democrats with less spending on defense and more on social programs. Vice President Bush says the administration is prepared to "have some battles on the House side".
- April 8 – Secretary of State Haig says Kremlin will gain "troubled waters in which to fish" should there be no peace agreement between Arabs and Israelis. Dr. Dennis O'Leary says that President Reagan will likely return to the White House in two days and will have fully recovered "within four months."
- April 9 – President Reagan releases a statement on the death of Omar Bradley.
- April 10 – Dr. O'Leary says that President Reagan will be released from Washington University Hospital during the weekend. Press Secretary Brady is reported to possibly suffer no permanent disabilities and eventually return to work amid problems on the left side of his body.
- April 11 – President Reagan is released from Washington University Hospital.
- April 13 – Secretary of State Haig awards the Valor Award of the State Department to 54 former American Iran hostages.
- April 14 – Deputy White House press secretary Larry Speakes says members of the Reagan administration hope to have conversations with Senators William Armstrong, Steven Symms, and Charles Grassley, the three Republican senators that voted against the budget blueprint by President Reagan.
- April 15 – President Reagan issues his first presidential pardons toward W. Mark Felt and Edward S. Miller.
- April 16 – President Reagan promises to protect whistleblowers of the ongoing instances of fraud and waste in the federal bureaucracy.
- April 23 – President Reagan orders US$25 billion be collected from individuals who owe the government and have yet to pay via an executive order issuing the involvement of each department in constructing a plan to obtains the funds and holding a person accountable for the program.

== May ==
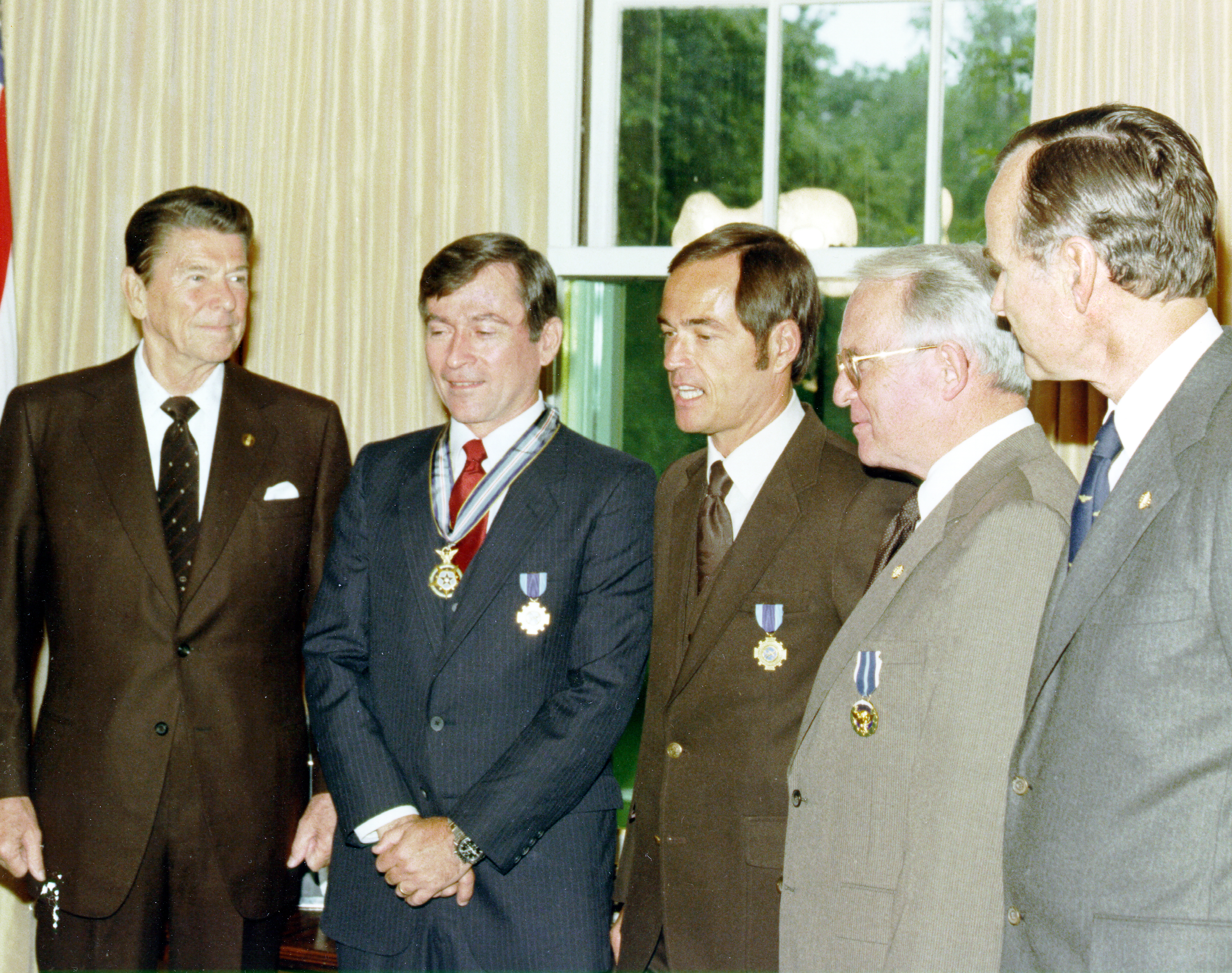
President Ronald Reagan presents astronaut John Young with the Congressional Space Medal of Honor as well as NASA's Distinguished Service Medal. Astronaut Robert C. Crippen also received the Distinguished Service Medal and Dr. Alan Lovelace was presented with the President's Citizens Medal, May 1, 1981

- May 1 – President Reagan has an informal visit with Charles, Prince of Wales at the White House. The federal government announces its decision to cease requirement of disclosure of beer, wine, and liquor ingredients and cites President Reagan's call for an end to regulations that were unnecessary.
- May 2 – Robert Byrd, the leader of the Democrats in the Senate, confirms he will vote for President Reagan's budget proposal during his weekly meeting with reporters.
- May 3 – The State Department says the Reagan administration has decided it must take the lead and supply a large portion of troops in creating an international peace-keeping force within Sinai Peninsula between Israel and Egypt.
- May 4 – Secretary of State Haig says it is the plan of the US to begin negotiating with the Soviet Union for the limiting nuclear weapons in Europe by the end of the year and that President Reagan sent a letter to Soviet Union leader Leonid Brezhnev in response to a letter Brezhnev had sent him two months prior in March. Vice President Bush calls opponents of the Reagan administration's economic program "obstructionists" for thwarting the will of the people while delivering a speech to the American Newspapers Publishers Association. Press Secretary Brady undergoes surgery for a third time after small blood clots were discovered on his right lung during the night hours. Dr. O'Leary says they are not life-threatening. President Reagan requests Israel allow American diplomats more time to work on the Lebanon crisis.
- May 5 – NATO endorses the Reagan administration's plan to start talks with Soviets by the end of the year. The Senate confirms 7 of President Reagan's 40 foreign policy nominees and a Senate committee approves 7 others for confirmation.
- May 6 – Secretary of the Treasury Regan says the administration is examining Social Security system changes during a breakfast session with reporters. The Senate Agriculture Committee agrees to a reduction of the maximum income level to receive food stamp rolls. The Reagan administration orders Libyan envoys out of Washington. Dean Fischer, spokesman of the State Department, says the choice was made due to the Libyan "people's bureau" displaying misconduct.
- May 7 – The Senate Agriculture Committee agrees to making able bodied persons work public service jobs in exchange for food stamps. The House votes 253 to 176 in an approval of President Reagan's fiscal 1982 budget. 63 Democrats joined the 190 Republicans in support of the president.
- May 8 – The Senate approves a US$7.9 billion reduction in cost-of-living increases for the following year toward the 44 million Americans receiving government retirement benefits.
- May 9 – Secretary of State Haig says the Soviet Union is showing signs of "spiritual exhaustion" amid "an extremely gloomy future" which could potentially make it a stronger adversary to the US while addressing the Syracuse University graduating class.
- May 11 – President Reagan proposes phasing out the current limitations on earning of the retired by three years during a meeting with his Cabinet Council on Human Resources. The Senate votes against proposals to double President Reagan's spending cuts and do away with the 1982 deficit of US$48.8 billion. The Senate Foreign Relations Committee approves cutting off military aid and withdrawing advisors unless President Reagan says in writing that the Salvadorian government is controlling its armed forces, observing human rights, and progressing on making political reform in a vote of 11 to 1.
- May 12 – The Reagan administration releases a proposal to slash benefits of those retiring at age 62 and stall the growth in benefits for future retirees as part of a plan to prevent the bankruptcy of the Social Security system. The Senate approves President Reagan's US$700.8 billion budget proposal for the 1982 fiscal year in a vote of 78 to 20. Senators Lowell Weicker and Gordon Humphrey are the only Republicans to oppose by vote.
- May 13 – Secretary of Defense Weinberger says he is content with NATO's European members admitting they may have to facilitate US deployments outside of Europe. Press Secretary Brady is reported as being in good condition following a recovery from a slight fever. President Reagan says he will pray for Pope John Paul II after learning of the latter's assassination attempt.
- May 14 – House and Senate budget writers approve a US$695.4 billion spending plan compromise. The plan makes way for President Reagan's cuts in taxes and spending.
- May 18 – Secretary of Defense Weinberger says the US is not balanced with the Soviet Union in terms of nuclear weapons, elaborating that such a difference is "inviting war", and the SALT II treaty is deceased to the US while speaking to a British Broadcaster Corp. interviewer.
- May 19 – President Reagan meets with Neil Armstrong, John Glenn, Alan Shepard, Gordon Cooper, Wally Schirra, Scott Carpenter, and 35 other astronauts in an Oval Office ceremony, Reagan saying that John Young and Bob Crippen "have made us very proud." Young and Crippen are both bestowed Distinguished Service Metals, and President Reagan gives Young a Congressional Space Medal of Honor. Secretary of Labor Donovan proposes new penalties, including fines of up to US$10,000 for failure to keep records of payroll and failing to pay minimum wage, for sweatshop employers. The House Ways and Means Committee approves a US$9.1 billion spending cut in benefit programs, including Social Security, Medicare, and unemployment.
- May 20 – The Senate votes unanimously to assure "Congress shall not precipitously and unfairly penalize early retires" in a vote of 96 to 0. It is a setback to President Reagan as it goes against his week-old plan to cut Social Security benefits in an attempt to prevent bankruptcy. The House approves the US$695.4 billion compromise 1982 budget plan in a vote of 244 to 155.
- May 21 – The Senate approves the outline of the 1982 budget guideline totaling US$695.4 billion in a vote of 76 to 20.
- May 23 – President Reagan announces his nominations of Lennie-Marie P. Tolliver as Commissioner on Aging in the Health and Human Resources Department, Rex E. Lee for United States Solicitor General in the Justice Department, and Anthony Muray, Jr. for Superintendent of the Mint of the United States at Philadelphia at the Treasury Department.
- May 25 – On Memorial Day, President Reagan declares the day one of "prayer for permanent peace, and I designate the hour beginning in each locality at 11 o'clock in the morning of that day as a time to unite in prayer." Reagan also urges all forms of information media, the entirety of American governors and government officials, and Puerto Rico Commonwealth to take part in his request.
- May 26 – President Reagan announces his nomination of Jose Manuel Casanova for Inter-American Development Bank Executive Director.
- May 27 – Deputy Press Secretary Larry Speakes releases a statement saying President Reagan wants Ambassador Habib to return to Washington so the pair can discuss the Middle East. President Reagan is said by Speakes to view the current time as an "appropriate moment to receive firsthand Ambassador Habib's views and to discuss with him the future of his continuing mission in the context of efforts peacefully to resolve the crisis involving events in Lebanon."
- May 29 – President Reagan announces his nomination of Allen B. Clark, Jr. for the position of Deputy Administrator of Veteran Affairs.
- May 30 – President Reagan sends a message to Congress requesting a Veterans Education Assistance Program extension.
- May 31 – President Reagan sends a message to Abdus Sattar on the assassination of Ziaur Rahman the previous day.

== June ==
- June 1 – President Reagan announces his nominations of Richard Mulberry for Inspector General at the Department of the Interior, and Robert Sherwood Dillon for Ambassador to Lebanon. President Reagan issues an executive order to the Military Rules of Evidence of the Manual for Courts-Martial.
- June 2 – President Reagan sends a message to Congress on the subjects of Romania trade, Hungary, and the People's Republic of China. President Reagan announces his nominations of June Gibbs Brown for Inspector General of NASA, and Robert Boone Hawkins, Jr. for private citizen member, Advisory Commission on Intergovernmental Relations in a two-year term.
- June 3 – President Reagan announces his nomination of Alton Gold Keel, Jr. for the Assistant Secretary of the Air Force position, and H. Monroe Brown as United States Ambassador to New Zealand while concurrently serving as United States Ambassador to Western Samoa.
- June 4 – During a talk with reporters, President Reagan says his meeting with Mother Teresa was wonderful, adding, "You can't be in the presence of someone like that without feeling better about the world." President Reagan also says he cannot currently disclose details of his tax plan. President Reagan announces his nominations of Dean E. Fischer for Assistant Secretary of State, and Vernon A. Walters for Ambassador at Large.
- June 5 – President Reagan meets with Ethel Kennedy, her children, and Senator Ted Kennedy in the Oval Office. President Reagan awards Ethel the Robert F. Kennedy Medal and says her late husband RFK gave "distinguished and dedicated service" to both the federal government and Americans during a ceremony in the Rose Garden.
- June 7 – Baruch Korff says President Reagan regularly confers with former President Nixon by sending top secret documents to the former president at his residence in New York City during a telephone interview.
- June 8 – In the morning hours, President Reagan speaks at the South Portico alongside President of Mexico Jose Lopez Portillo. Reagan and Portillo meet in the Yellow Oval Room after the ceremony and later traveled together to Camp David. President Reagan sends a message to Congress detailing the rescissions of the budget.
- June 9 – President Reagan announces his nominations of Alvin W. Trivelpiece for Director for Office of Energy Research in the Department of Energy, Dallas Lynn Peck for Director of the Geological Survey in the Interior Department, and William M. Otter to be Administrator of the Wage and Hour Division for the Labor Department. President Reagan says his communications with President of Mexico Portillo were "frank, they were valuable, and they lead to a closer relationship between our two countries" while speaking to reporters at the North Portico in the afternoon hours.
- June 10 – President Reagan announces appointments of the White House Fellows for the 1981-82 year.
- June 11 – Deputy Press Secretary Speakes reports that President Reagan in upcoming meetings with Ambassadors wants them "to be aware of his commitment and the commitment of the United States to the furtherance of the peace process in that critical region of the world. He wishes the Ambassadors to convey this to their respective governments."
- June 12 – President Reagan signs a resolution and proclamation declaring July 17, 1981 National P.O.W.-M.I.A. Recognition Day during a Rose Garden ceremony in the afternoon hours.
- June 13 – President Reagan releases a statement on federal regulations being reduced, saying that when federal regulations are excessive they "limit job opportunities, raise prices, and reduce the incomes of all Americans."

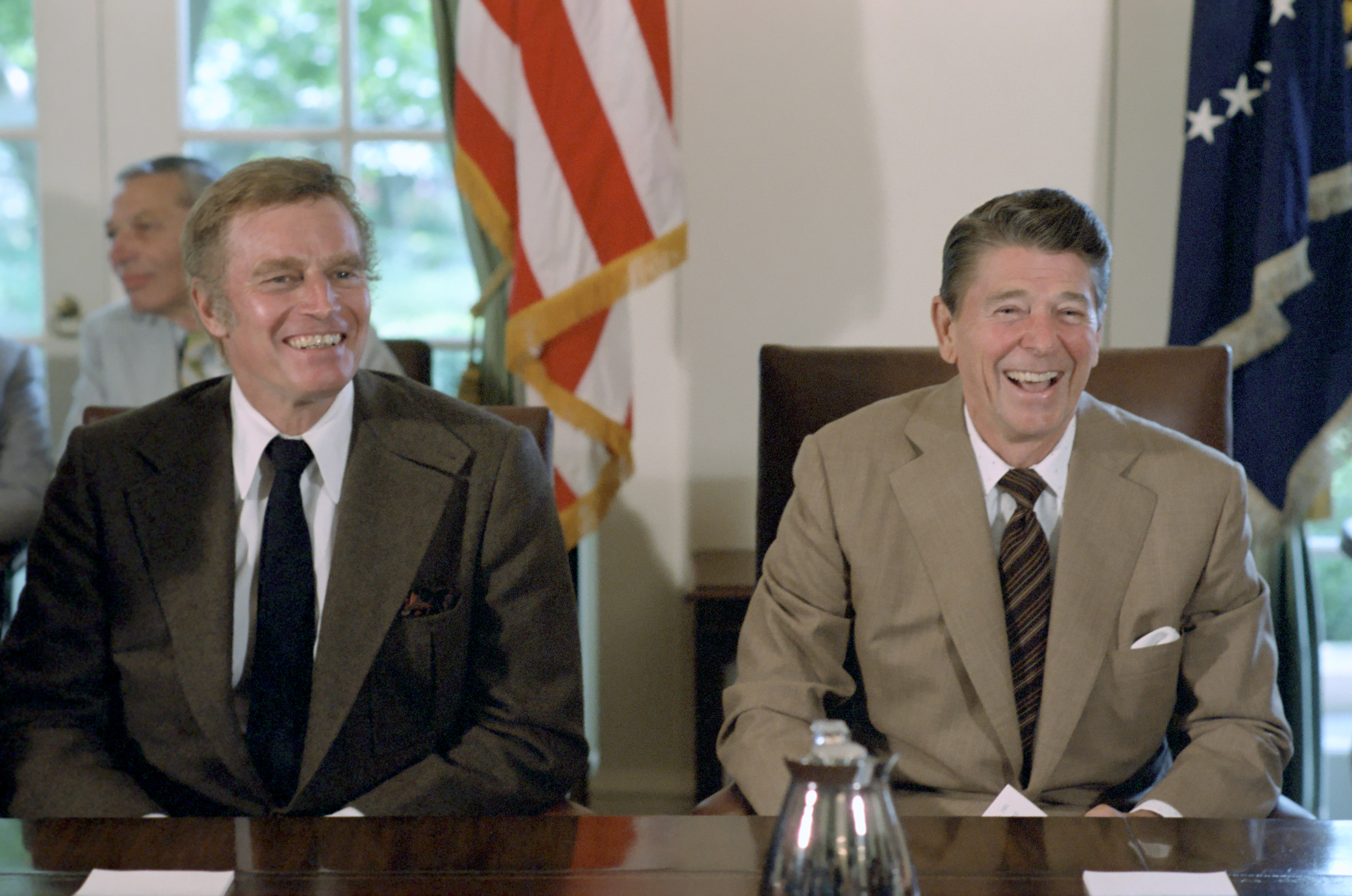
President Reagan with Charlton Heston at a meeting with the Presidential Task Force on the Arts and Humanities in the White House Cabinet Room, June 15, 1981.

- June 15 – In a letter to Attorney General Civiletti, noting the Voting Rights Act of 1965 has provisions set to expire within the following year and hoping to complete an assessment to allow Congress's enacting of a bill prior to the expiration, President Reagan says the Voting Rights Act has "made a massive contribution to the achievement of full constitutional and political equality for black Americans."
- June 16 – President Reagan announces his nomination of Joan M. Clark for Director General of the Foreign Service in the State Department.
- June 17 – President Reagan signs a Veterans Medicare Bill. Reagan says during the signing that the "legislation is aimed at maintaining the quality of medical care for our veterans."
- June 18 – President Reagan sends a letter to Associate Justice of the Supreme Court of the United States Potter Stewart in which he states he accepts his retirement.
- June 19 – President Reagan announces his nominations of J. Raymond Bell for membership in the Foreign Claims Settlement Commission of the United States in the Justice Department, Frank H. Conway for membership of the Foreign Claims Settlement Commission of the United States in Department of Justice, L. Ebersole Gaines for Executive Vice President of the Overseas Private Investment Corporation in United States International Development Cooperation Agency, Bevis Longstreth for membership of the Securities and Exchange Commission, Parker W. Borg for United States Ambassador to the Republic of Mali, and Robert Strausz-Hupe for United States Ambassador to the Republic of Turkey.
- June 22 – In the afternoon, President Reagan speaks at the White House Opening of the "Champions of American Sport" Exhibition in the East Room.
- June 23 – President Reagan speaks of the Conable-Hance tax program "as an appetizer" ahead of breakfast with Democratic congressmen.

== July ==
- July 3 – 80 protestors are arrested following a sit down at the White House in response to budget cuts of the Reagan administration as well as its policy toward El Salvador. China warns the US against possibly straining relations between the two by not repealing the Taiwan Relations Act. President Reagan issues a statement on the following day's observance of the Fourth of July.
- July 6 – President Reagan issues a message to Congress regarding an agreement on nuclear energy between the United States and Egypt.
- July 7 – President Reagan nominates Sandra Day O'Connor, the first woman to the U.S. Supreme Court.

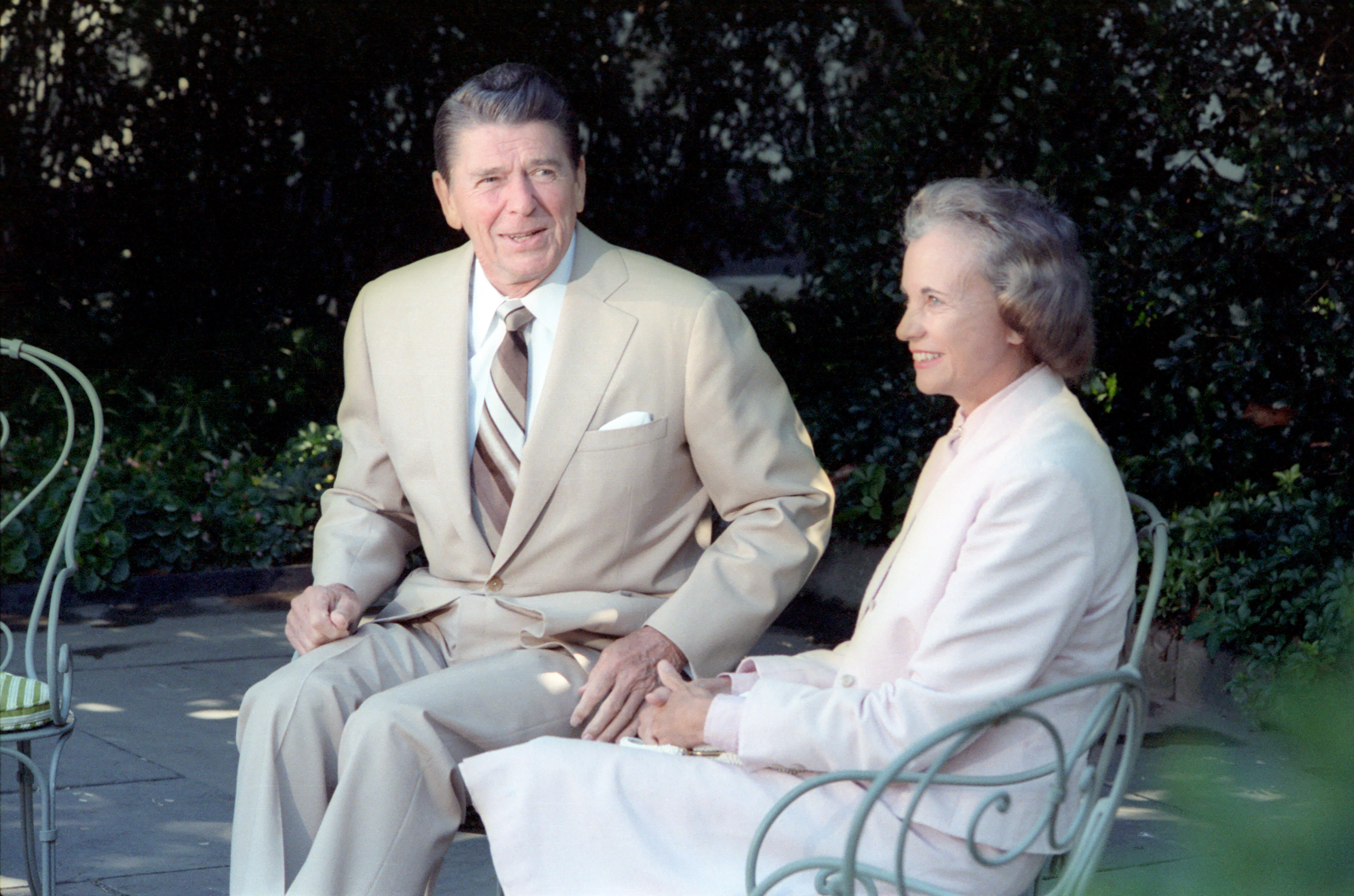
President Ronald Reagan and his Supreme Court Justice nominee Sandra Day O'Connor at the White House, July 15, 1981.

- July 14 – Max Hugel, the Deputy Director for Clandestine Operations of the CIA, resigns following reports of illegal stock trading while denying wrongdoing.
- July 15 – President Reagan obtains a promise from Speaker of the House Tip O'Neill for Congress to remain in session until August 7 for further attempts to complete the bills for budget and tax.
- July 16 – The Justice Department begins collecting records on FBI Director William Casey.
- July 20 – President Reagan suspends 10 F-16 fighter bomber jets delivery to Israel.
- July 22 – Secretary of Defense Weinberger says Philip Habib's efforts to bring peace have been setback by Began launching Lebanon military raids.
- July 23 – President Reagan accepts a plan adjusting automatic tax cuts for inflation each year as part of changes to his tax bill.
- July 28 – President Reagan releases a message to the Senate regarding a United States-Sweden Supplementary Convention on extradition.
- July 29 – In a 238 to 195 vote, the House of Representatives approves President Reagan's tax cut bill.
- July 30 – President Reagan releases a statement on the immigration and refugee policy toward the United States, saying in part, "We shall seek new ways to integrate refugees into our society without nurturing their dependence on welfare."
- July 31 – President Reagan announces the appointments of Stanton D. Anderson for membership on the Advisory Committee for Trade Negotiations and Henry G. Cisneros for membership on the Presidential Advisory Committee on Federalism, and the nominations of William Courtney Sherman for Deputy Representative of the United States of America in the Security Council of the United Nations with the Ambassador rank and Ronald I. Spiers for United States Ambassador to Pakistan.

== August ==
- August 3 – President Reagan holds a session of questions and answers with reporters on the subject of the Air Traffic Controllers Strike in the Rose Garden during the morning hours.
- August 4 – President Reagan speaks at the presentation of his receiving unspent fiscal year funds for 1981 from the Agency for International Development in the Rose Garden during the afternoon.
- August 5 – President Reagan fires 11,345 striking air traffic controllers who ignored an order to return to work under the terms of the Labor Management Relations Act of 1947.
- August 6 – According to administration officials, President Reagan approves the proceeding of production of neutron weapons during a White House meeting.
- August 7 – Transportation Secretary Drew Lewis notes receiving reports from air traffic workers who claimed to be harassed and were afraid to return to work, saying they can come back to work if the administration is able to confirm the legitimacy of their claims.
- August 12 – President Reagan announces his nomination of Raymond C. Ewing for the position of United States Ambassador to the Republic of Cyprus.
- August 13 – President Reagan signs the Economic Recovery Tax Act of 1981.
- August 14 – President Reagan announces his nomination of Lenora Cole-Alexander for Director of the Women's Bureau in the Department of Labor.
- August 17 – President Reagan announces his nomination of Michael H. Newlin for United States Ambassador to the Democratic Popular Republic of Algeria.
- August 18 – President Reagan says he has begun preliminary works for both the 1983 and 1984 budgets after ending a meeting with top advisors on budget and security. President Reagan announces his nominations of Arthur Adair Hartman for United States Ambassador to the Union of Soviet Socialist Republics, and Harry G. Barnes, Jr. for United States Ambassador to India.
- August 20 – President Reagan delivers a speech aboard the U.S.S. Constellation.
- August 28 – President Reagan announces his nominations of Malcolm R. Lovell, Jr. for United States Under Secretary of Labor, Frank V. Ortiz, Jr. for United States Ambassador to Peru, and David B. Funderburk for United States Ambassador to the Socialist Republic of Romania.
- August 29 – President Reagan wishes Press Secretary Brady "a happy 41st birthday" in a public statement and telephones him in private.
- August 31 – President Reagan sends a message to Congress on federal civilian pay increases.

== September ==
- September 1 – Reagan administration officials disclose that there will soon be an announcement by the administration on federal employment cuts of 100,000 over a two-year span.
- September 2 – President Reagan says the Soviet Union will agree to legitimate arms reduction that is verifiable or position themselves to have an arms race "which they can't win" during a Palmer House reception.
- September 3 – President Reagan delivers an address to the Annual Convention of the United Brotherhood of Carpenters and Joiners at the McCormick Place in Chicago, Illinois, noting its centennial in his remarks.
- September 4 – President Reagan is announced to have asked for Vice President Bush's leadership of the delegation from America in bilateral economic talks between the latter country and Nigeria. President Reagan announces the appointing of Rodney N. Searle to Chairman of the Upper Mississippi River Basin Commission, and the nominations of Jeffrey S. Bragg for Federal Insurance Administrator, Susan Meredith Phillips for Commissioner of the Commodity Futures Trading Commission, Charles Timothy Hagel for Deputy Administrator of Veterans Affairs, Donald James Quigg for Deputy Commissioner of Patents and Trademarks, Faith Ryan Whittlesey for Ambassador to Switzerland, Joseph Verner Reed, Jr. for United States Ambassador to the Kingdom of Morocco, and Thomas Aranda, Jr. for United States Ambassador to Uruguay.
- September 16 – President Reagan announces his nominating of C. Everett Koop for Surgeon General of the Public Health Service, and F. Callahan for membership on the National Credit Union Administration.
- September 17 – President Reagan announces his nominations of Thomas R. Pickering for Ambassador to the Federal Republic of Nigeria, and Rickey Dale James for membership on the Mississippi River Commission.
- September 18 – President Reagan visits and tours the Gerald R. Ford Presidential Library and Museum along with his wife, Mexico President Portillo, Canada Prime Minister Trudeau, former France President Giscard d'Estaing, and former President and First Lady Ford, and later delivers remarks at the dedication ceremony. President Reagan speaks at the Biennial Convention of the National Federation of Republican Women at the Denver Convention Complex in Denver, Colorado in the afternoon.
- September 21 – President Reagan meets with 17 private sector organizations at the White House and delivers an address before them briefly touching on his administration's economic plan in the morning.
- September 21 – The Senate confirms Sandra Day O'Connor as an Associate Justice of the Supreme Court in a vote of 99–0.

== October ==
- October 1 – President Reagan announces Saudi Arabia will not be allowed by the US to be taken over similarly to Iran during a televised press conference.
- October 5 – President Reagan delivers a speech at the Annual Meeting of the National Alliance of Business at the Sheraton Washington Hotel. President Reagan announces his designating of the upcoming October 11 as "General Pulaski Memorial Day" in honor of Casimir Pulaski.
- October 6 – President Reagan issues a public statement on the death of President of Egypt Anwar Sadat, calling the latter "a courageous man whose vision and wisdom brought nations and people together."
- October 7 – President Reagan announces his nomination of Geoffrey Swaebe for United States Representative to the European Office of the United Nations.
- October 8 – President Reagan meets with former Presidents Jimmy Carter, Richard Nixon, and Gerald Ford in a small ceremony ahead of their attending the funeral of Anwar Sadat as representatives for the United States. It marks the first time in U.S. history that four presidents were together.
- October 14 – President Reagan announces his nominations of Evan Griffith Galbraith for United States Ambassador to France, and Francis S. M. Hodsoll for Chairman of the National Endowment of the Arts.
- October 30 – President Reagan nominates Francis Terry McNamara for Ambassador to the Gabonese Republic and to the Democratic Republic of São Tomé and Príncipe, Benjamin F. Baer for Commissioner of the United States Parole Commission, Warner M. Depuy for Alternate Federal member of the Susquehanna River Basin Commission, Charles L. Hardwick for membership on the Presidential Advisory Committee on Federalism, ten individuals for the Federal Council on Aging, individuals for positions of chairmanship on the 10 Federal Regional Councils, and Elliot Abrams as Assistant Secretary of State.
- October 31 – President Reagan nominates Milan D. Bish for the position of Ambassador to Barbados, Commonwealth of Dominica, Saint Lucia, and Saint Vincent and the Grenadines, Antigua and Barbuda, and Janet McCoy for High Commissioner of the Trust Territory of the Pacific Islands.

== November ==
- November 1 – Officials say the US has been urged by Israel to be aware of a peace plan by the Middle East that Israel turned down.
- November 2 – President Reagan formally welcomes Hussein of Jordan on the South Lawn of the White House in the morning hours. President Reagan and Hussein meet with Vice President Bush, Secretary of State Haig, Assistant to the President Allen, and United States Ambassador to Jordan Viets in the Oval Office. President Reagan attends a State Dining Room dinner in honor of Hussien, exchanging public comments with the latter during the night hours. President Reagan also announces his nomination of John McKean for the position of Governor of the United States Postal Service.
- November 3 – Secretary of State Haig accuses National Security Advisor Allen of having run a guerilla campaign against him since the second month of the administration. Senator Joe Biden says the Reagan administration notified Congress of its intent to sell satellite components the day ahead of the sale to ARABSAT.
- November 9 – Secretary of Treasury Regan announces the Reagan administration has halted plans to ask Congress for tax increases of US$3 billion.
- November 10 – President Reagan calls on Americans to "stiffen its spine and not throw in the towel" on the subject of further federal spending cuts during a televised news conference.

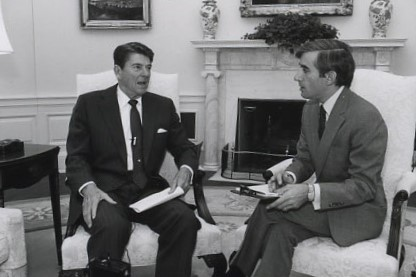
Donald Lambro interviews Ronald Reagan in 1981 in Oval Office, November 16, 1981

- November 16 – President Reagan removes Arthur S. Flemming as Civil Rights Commission chairman and names Clarence Pendleton as his successor.
- November 18 – Reagan administration officials say they will present their proposal for Europe-based medium range nuclear missiles to be eliminated to the Soviets based in Geneva.
- November 19 – The White House discloses Edwin Meese meet with the FBI for determining whether there should be any charges applied to Richard Allen for the latter taking a cash agreement of US$1,000 two weeks ago.
- November 20 – President Reagan attends the dedication of the Library of Congress James Madison Memorial Building in the morning. President Reagan announces his nominations of Franklin S. Forsberg for United States Ambassabor to Sweden and Herbert R. Lippold, Jr. for membership of the Mississippi River Commission.
- November 24 – Reagan administration officials says the president's conflict with Congress on the issue of government spending is a mere preview of an upcoming conflict for President Reagan to gain reductions in the 1983 budget he will seek in two months.
- November 27 – President Reagan announces several nominations, including Clarence E. Hodges for Chief of the Children's Bureau in the Department of Health and Human Services, James N. Broder for membership on the Federal Council on the Aging, and several employees for the National Commission for Employment Policy.
- November 29 – President Reagan speaks by telephone to the Miami, Florida Plenary Session of the Caribbean and Central America Action Conference while at his California ranch.
- November 30 – President Reagan states his intent to not abstain "one inch" from his economic plan while speaking at a Republican fundraising cocktail and reception dinner in Cincinnati, Ohio. Vice President Bush meets with President of AFL-CIO Lane Kirkland in the former's White House office as part of an attempt at reconciling with union leaders opposed to the air traffic controllers firing by President Reagan as well as the administration's economic policies.

== December ==
- December 1 – During a White House Conference on Aging attended by 2,300 delegates, President Reagan says his administration will not "betray those entitled to Social Security benefits". Spokesman David Gergen tells reporters that President Reagan is not presently considering putting air controllers in towers.
- December 2 – President Reagan announces the appointment of forty-four members of the President's Task Force on Private Sector Initiatives, and thirteen members on the President's Council on Physical Fitness and Sports. President Reagan also delivers an address to members of the President's Task Force on Private Sector Initiatives during a luncheon meeting.
- December 3 – Production of the B-1 bomber is approved by the Senate.
- December 4 – President Reagan announces the appointments of Kenneth M. Duberstein to be Assistant to the President for Legislative Affairs, Richard W. Heldridge for membership on the Board of Directors of the Export-Import Bank of the United States, Bernard J. Lasker and Clyde H. Slease the Board of Visitors of the United States Military Academy, Edward R. Borcherdt, Jr. and Bernard E. Smith, Jr. for membership on the Board of Visitors for the United States Naval Academy, Terrence O'Donnell and Henry B. Sayler for membership of the Board of Visitors for the United States Air Force Academy, Walter Cutler for United States Ambassador to Tunisia, Maurice H. Stans for membership of the Board of Directors of the Overseas Private Investment Corporation, and Walter Gellhorn and Otis M. Smith for membership of the Council of the Administrative Conference of the United States. President Reagan signs the Energy and Water Development Appropriation Act of 1982. President Reagan announces his issuing of two executive orders, one "to govern the activities of our intelligence agencies" and another "to reestablish the Intelligence Oversight Board".
- December 6 – Moammar Khadafy calls President Reagan alongside denials of plotting to assassinate him during an interview with David Brinkley on This Week With David Brinkley. The State Department replies that the US has evidence in regards to his possible plotting of the assassinations of American officials. A spokesman says President Reagan told aides he is awaiting the outcome of Richard V. Allen's inquiry to decide on the latter's return as National Security Advisor.
- December 7 – President Reagan says he won't "believe a word" from Moammar Khadafy and that the US has evidence and Khadafy is privy to that information during a short meeting with reporters.
- December 8 – An unnamed government official discloses that the Justice Department has included Richard Allen in an investigation into national security as a result of Allen not listing the names of clients of his consulting firm in a financial disclosure firm.
- December 10 – President Reagan requests American firms to withdraw 1,500 Libya-based American citizens.
- December 11 – The Reagan administration gives an estimation that 25% of all Americans receiving social security benefits should lose their payments, given a state of not meeting qualifications given their good health.
- December 12 – President Reagan announces that the President's Volunteer Action Awards has been established.
- December 15 – President Reagan says intervention by the Soviet Union in Poland would "be taken most seriously by all of the Free World" while speaking to newsmen amid an Oval Office picture taking session.
- December 17 – President Reagan holds his six presidential press conference, during which condemning Poland for "coercion and violation of human rights" and saying the US cannot give economic aid to Poland unless martial law is lifted.
- December 18 – President Reagan orders the suspension of the U.S.-Israel security agreement as well as the US$200 million purchase from the Pentagon of Israeli defense-related goods and services.
- December 21 – White House spokesman Larry Speakes says President Reagan will be urged during the week to increase taxes as a way of quelling a growing deficit in the budget.
- December 24 – Secretary of State Haig says there will be an immediate collapse of the Poland economy and thereby guarantee further refusal to the regime of martial law there.
- December 27 – It is announced that Health and Human Services Secretary Schwelker orders that doctors and other health professionals receive a crackdown in the event they have defaulted from student loans.
- December 28 – Senior administration officials say President Reagan spoke with advisors over the phone while he was in California for the purpose of imposing sanctions against the Soviet Union in response to its purposed connection to Poland's imposition of martial law.
- December 29 – President Reagan announces his nomination of James Sanderson for Assistant Administrator of the Environmental Protection Agency and appointing of eleven members to the American Battle Monuments Commission.
- December 30 – President Reagan announces his choice of four new members to the Board of Directors of the National Railroad Passenger Corporation.
