= John W. Nields Jr. =

American lawyer

John W. Nields Jr. (born September 24, 1942) is a lawyer who was chief counsel for the House Committee investigating the Iran–Contra affair.

== Early life and education ==
Nields was born in New York City in 1942. His father John Sr. was a lawyer for Cahill Gordon & Reindel; his mother was named Lila. Nields graduated from Yale University in 1964. He received a law degree from University of Pennsylvania Law School in 1967.

== Career and politics ==
In 1969, he was admitted to the New York Bar; he is also a member of the District of Columbia bar. He was an Assistant US Attorney for the Southern District of New York (1969–1974), senior law clerk for Supreme Court justice Byron R. White (1974–1977). He was the chief prosecutor in the trial of W. Mark Felt and Edward S. Miller in 1980. In 1987, he was chief counsel for the House Select Committee to Investigate Covert Arms Transactions with Iran. It investigated the Iran–Contra affair, and he interrogated witnesses such as Oliver North. In 1999, he represented Webster Hubbell, who pled guilty to charges of fraud and income tax evasion.

He was co-chair of white-collar defense practice at the Howrey firm. In 2012, he was of counsel at Covington and Burling in Washington, D.C.

He is married to Gail Tenney Nields. Their daughter, Nerissa Franklin Nields, also a Yale alumna, married in 1990.

== See also ==
- List of law clerks for the sixth seat of the Supreme Court of the United States
