= 1981 State of the Union Address =

Speech by US President Jimmy Carter

- Date: January 16, 1981
- Location: Washington, D.C.
- Type: State of the Union Address
- Participants: Jimmy Carter; Walter Mondale; Tip O'Neill
- Format: Written
- Previous: 1980 State of the Union Address
- Next: 1981 Joint session speech

The 1981 State of the Union address was delivered by President Jimmy Carter, the 39th president of the United States, to the 97th United States Congress in written format on January 16, 1981. In this address, Carter discussed economic issues as well as the Iranian hostage crisis. Carter began his speech with:

The State of the Union is sound. Our economy is recovering from a recession. A national energy plan is in place and our dependence on foreign oil is decreasing. We have been at peace for four uninterrupted years. But, our Nation has serious problems. Inflation and unemployment are unacceptably high. The world oil market is increasingly tight. There are trouble spots throughout the world, and 53 American hostages are being held in Iran against international law and against every precept of human affairs.

This state of the union address holds the record of being the longest state of the union address at 33,667 words.

To date, this State of the Union address was the last one given by a president in January of the same year in which he left office. To date, this is also the last State of the Union address that has been delivered only in written format.

== See also ==
- 1980 United States presidential election

Preceded by 1980 State of the Union Address	State of the Union addresses 1981	Succeeded by 1981 joint session speech
