= 1983 State of the Union Address =

Speech by US President Ronald Reagan

- Full video of the speech as published by the Ronald Reagan Presidential Library
- Date: January 25, 1983
- Time: 9:00 p.m. EST
- Duration: 46 minutes
- Venue: House Chamber, United States Capitol
- Location: Washington, D.C.; 38°53′23″N 77°00′32″W
- Type: State of the Union Address
- Participants: Ronald Reagan; George H. W. Bush; Tip O'Neill
- Previous: 1982 State of the Union Address
- Next: 1984 State of the Union Address

The 1983 State of the Union Address was given by the 40th president of the United States, Ronald Reagan, on January 25, 1983, at 9:00 p.m. EST, in the chamber of the United States House of Representatives to the 98th United States Congress. It was Reagan's second State of the Union Address and his third speech to a joint session of the United States Congress. Presiding over this joint session was the House speaker, Tip O'Neill, accompanied by George H. W. Bush, the vice president in his capacity as the president of the Senate.

The speech lasted approximately 46 minutes and contained 5554 words. The address was broadcast live on radio and television.

The Democratic Party response was delivered by Senator Robert Byrd (WV), Senator Paul Tsongas (MA), Senator Bill Bradley (NJ), Senator Joe Biden (DE), Rep. Tom Daschle (SD), Rep. Barbara Kennelly (CT), House Speaker Thomas P. O'Neill III (MA), Rep. George Miller (CA), Rep. Les AuCoin (OR), Rep. Paul Simon (IL), Rep. Timothy Wirth (CO), and Rep. Bill Hefner (NC).

== See also ==
- Speeches and debates of Ronald Reagan

| Preceded by 1982 State of the Union Address | State of the Union addresses 1983 | Succeeded by 1984 State of the Union Address |
