= 1982 State of the Union Address =

Speech by US President Ronald Reagan

- Full video of the speech as published by the Ronald Reagan Presidential Library
- Date: January 26, 1982
- Time: 9:00 p.m. EST
- Duration: 40 minutes
- Venue: House Chamber, United States Capitol
- Location: Washington, D.C.; 38°53′23″N 77°00′32″W
- Type: State of the Union Address
- Participants: Ronald Reagan; George H. W. Bush; Tip O'Neill
- Previous: 1981 Joint session speech
- Next: 1983 State of the Union Address

The 1982 State of the Union Address was given by the 40th president of the United States, Ronald Reagan, on January 26, 1982, at 9:00 p.m. EST, in the chamber of the United States House of Representatives to the 97th United States Congress. It was Reagan's first State of the Union Address and his second speech to a joint session of the United States Congress. Presiding over this joint session was the House speaker, Tip O'Neill, accompanied by George H. W. Bush, the vice president in his capacity as the president of the Senate.

The speech lasted 40 minutes and 14 seconds and contained 5154 words. The address was broadcast live on radio and television.

The speech was the first to acknowledge a special guest, Lenny Skutnik, who was an ordinary hero of Air Florida Flight 90 took place two weeks earlier. Taking the place of Supreme Court Justice Byron White was retired Justice Potter Stewart.

The Democratic Party response was delivered by Senator Donald Riegle (MI), Senator James Sasser (TN), Rep. Albert Gore Jr. (TN), Senator Robert Byrd (WV), Senator Edward Kennedy (MA), House Speaker Tip O'Neill (MA), Senator Gary Hart (CO), Senator Paul Sarbanes (MD), Senator J. Bennett Johnston (LA), and Senator Alan Cranston (CA).

== See also ==
- Speeches and debates of Ronald Reagan
- 1982 United States House of Representatives elections

| Preceded by 1981 joint session speech | State of the Union addresses 1982 | Succeeded by 1983 State of the Union Address |
