= First inauguration of Ronald Reagan =

49th United States presidential inauguration

First presidential inauguration of Ronald Reagan
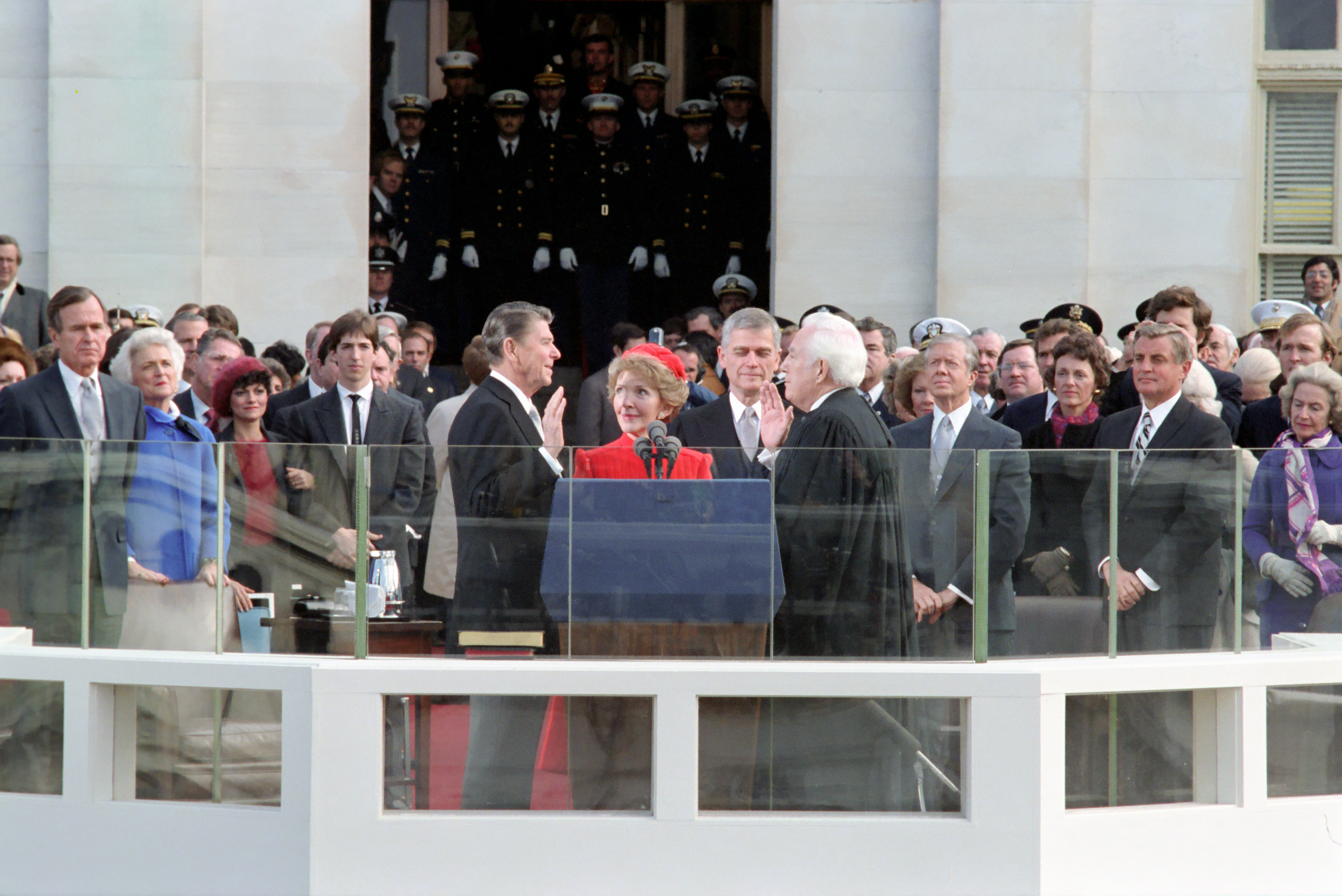
- Ronald Reagan takes the oath of office as the 40th president of the United States
- Date: January 20, 1981; 45 years ago
- Location: United States Capitol, Washington, D.C.
- Organized by: Joint Congressional Committee on Inaugural Ceremonies
- Participants: Ronald Reagan; 40th president of the United States — Assuming office Warren E. Burger; Chief Justice of the United States — Administering oath George H. W. Bush; 43rd vice president of the United States — Assuming office Potter Stewart; Associate Justice of the Supreme Court of the United States — Administering oath

The first inauguration of Ronald Reagan as the 40th president of the United States was held on Tuesday, January 20, 1981, at the West Front of the United States Capitol in Washington, D.C. This was the first inauguration to be held on the building's west side. This was the 49th inauguration and marked the commencement of Ronald Reagan's and George H. W. Bush's first term as president and vice president, respectively. Chief Justice Warren E. Burger administered the presidential oath of office to Reagan, who placed his hand upon a family Bible given to him by his mother, open to 2 Chronicles 7:14. Associate Justice Potter Stewart administered the vice presidential oath to Bush.

At 69 years, 349 days of age on Inauguration Day, Reagan was the oldest person to assume the presidency until Donald Trump's first inauguration in 2017, at the age of 70 years, 220 days. While the inauguration was taking place, the 52 Americans being held hostage in Iran were released.

== Inaugural committee ==
The 1981 Joint Congressional Committee on Inaugural Ceremonies, the group responsible for the planning and execution of the inauguration, was composed of:

- Senator Mark Hatfield (R-OR), Chairman
- Senator Howard Baker (R-TN)
- Senator Robert Byrd (D-WV)
- Senator Claiborne Pell (D-RI)
- Representative John Jacob Rhodes (R-AZ)
- Representative Robert H. Michel (R-IL)
- Representative Thomas P. O’Neill Jr. (D-MA)
- Representative Jim Wright (D-TX)

It was this committee that made the decision to move the inauguration to the West Front of the Capitol from the East Portico, where it had been held, with few exceptions, since 1837. Decided upon in June 1980, the move was made in part to save money, since the West Front terraces could be used as an inaugural platform, eliminating the need to build one from scratch. Additionally, using the side of the building facing the National Mall would provide more space for spectators.

Ronald Reagan wore a stroller for daytime, and white tie for the inaugural ball.

== Oath of office ==
Reagan recited the following, as prescribed by the Constitution:

I, Ronald Reagan, do solemnly swear that I will faithfully execute the Office of President of the United States, and will to the best of my ability, preserve, protect and defend the Constitution of the United States. [So help me God.]

== Inaugural address and release of hostages ==
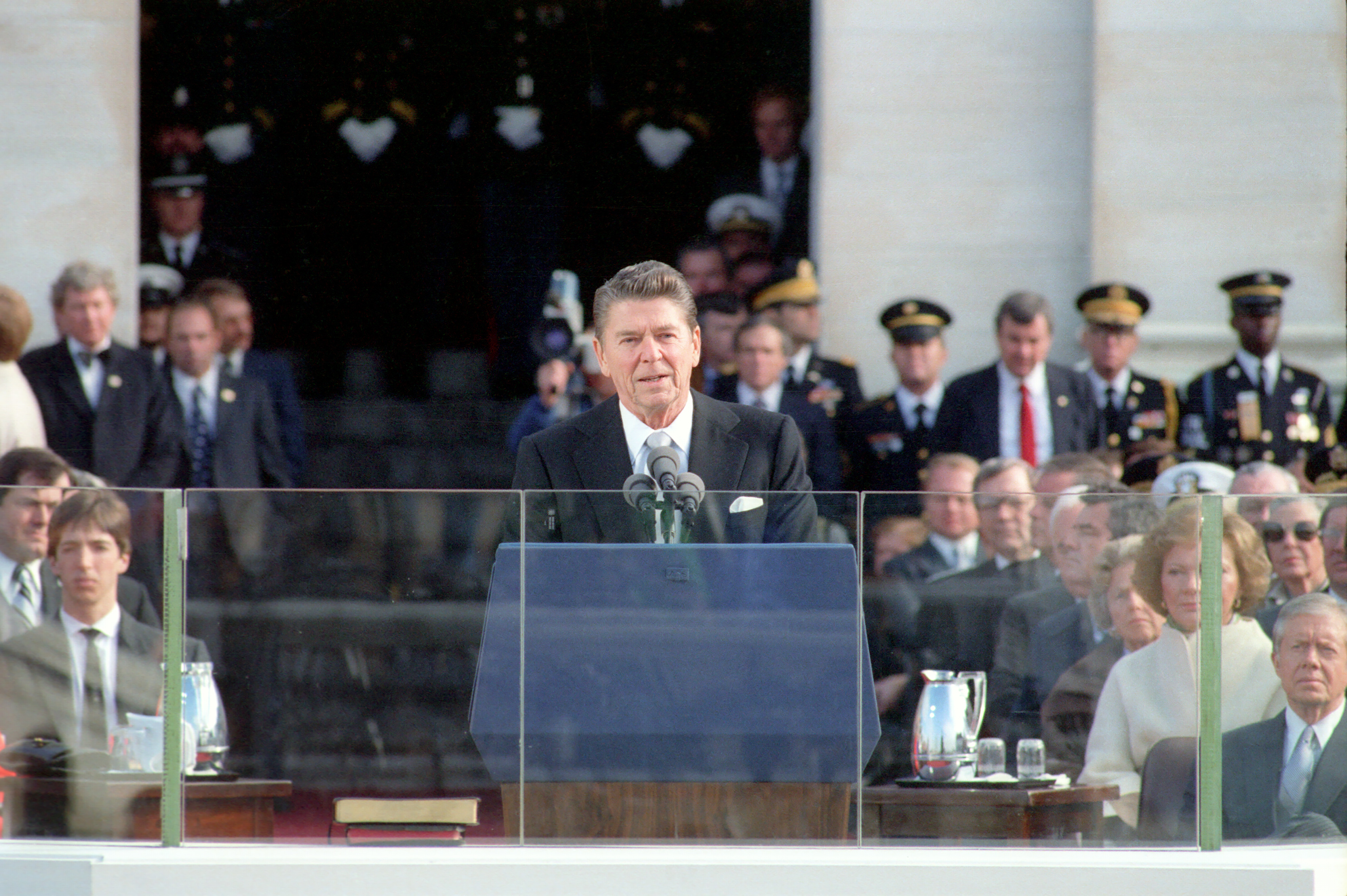
Reagan delivering his inaugural address from the United States Capitol

Reagan's inaugural address was 2,452 words long. It utilized the vista offered by the West Front, invoking the symbolism of the presidential memorials and Arlington National Cemetery in the distance. As Reagan was giving his address, the 52 Americans held hostage in Iran for 444 days were released.

The Reverend Donn Moomaw, pastor of the Bel Air Presbyterian Church in Los Angeles, where Reagan and his wife, Nancy, worshipped, gave the invocation and benediction at the ceremony, and said: "We thank you, O God, for the release of our hostages." However, his prayer came before the hostages left Tehran.

President Reagan was about to have lunch with congressional leaders in Statuary Hall in the Capitol after the inauguration ceremony when he was informed that the plane carrying the hostages had left Iranian airspace. During the luncheon, he broke the news saying: "With thanks to Almighty God, I have been given a tag line, the get-off line, that everyone wants for the end of a toast or a speech, or anything else. Some 30 minutes ago, the planes bearing our prisoners left Iranian air space, and they're now free of Iran." It is quite possible that the hostages left Tehran right before the ceremony started. The press held off on the announcement because it was next to impossible to discuss this development and the unfolding ceremony at the same time.

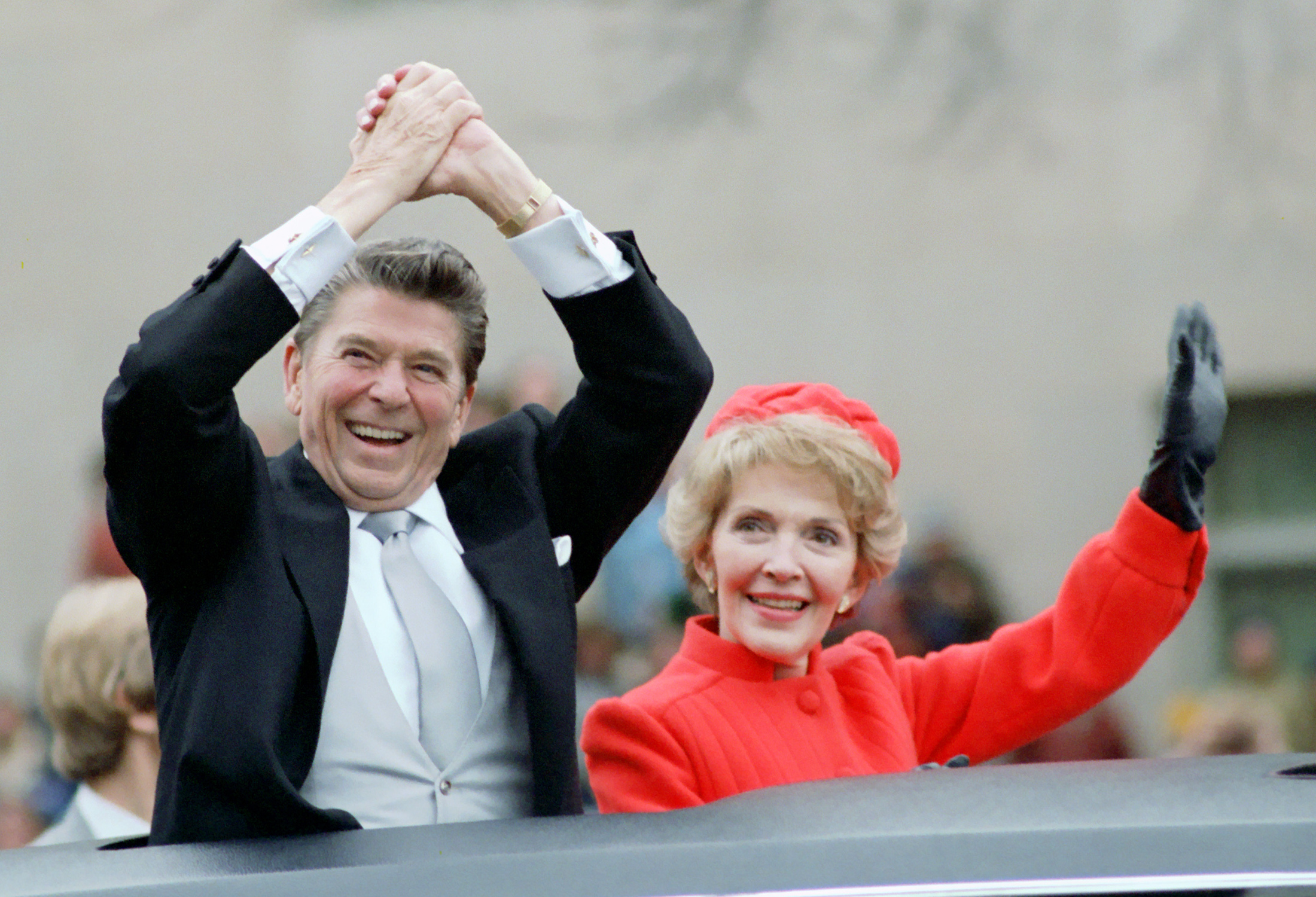
The Reagans in the inaugural parade

Throughout Washington and throughout the country, there were celebrations to mark the inauguration and the release of the hostages. For the only time, the National Christmas Tree on the ellipse near the White House was lighted on an Inauguration Day, and it was done to mark the release of the hostages. There were signs saying "444 DAYS!" as part of the celebrations. People wrapped the country in yellow ribbons, plastered freedom messages on billboards, and started preparations for welcoming the freed hostages home. The yellow-ribbon became a symbol of the solidarity of Americans with the hostages. The Statue of Liberty in New York Harbor was bathed in light, the Empire State Building lit in red, white, and blue, and the Boston Fire Department sounded gongs to hail deliverance of the hostages.

== Weather ==
The noontime temperature on the day of the inauguration was 55 °F (13 °C), unseasonably warm for Washington, D.C., in January.

== Inaugural gala ==
On the eve of the inauguration, ABC hosted an All-Star Inaugural Gala on January 19, 1981. The ceremony was hosted by Johnny Carson and included performances from Bob Hope, James Stewart, Ben Vereen, Ethel Merman, Charlton Heston, Rich Little, and Frank Sinatra.

== See also ==
- Presidential transition of Ronald Reagan
- Second inauguration of Ronald Reagan
- Timeline of the Ronald Reagan presidency (1981)
- 1980 United States presidential election
- Ronald Reagan 1980 presidential campaign

== Sources ==
- Moody, Sidney C. (1981). 444 days: the American hostage story. New York: Rutledge Press.
- Salinger, Pierre (1981). America held hostage: the secret negotiations. Garden City, N.Y.: Doubleday.
