= 1981 Ronald Reagan speech to a joint session of Congress =

Speech by US President Ronald Reagan

- Full video of the speech as published by the Ronald Reagan Presidential Library
- Date: February 18, 1981
- Time: 9:00 p.m. EST
- Duration: 33 minutes
- Venue: House Chamber, United States Capitol
- Location: Washington, D.C.; 38°53′23″N 77°00′32″W
- Type: Unofficial State of the Union Address
- Participants: Ronald Reagan; George H. W. Bush; Tip O'Neill
- Previous: 1981 State of the Union Address
- Next: 1982 State of the Union Address

Ronald Reagan, the 40th president of the United States, addressed a joint session of the United States Congress on Wednesday, February 18, 1981. It was his first public address before a joint session. Like a State of the Union Address, it was delivered before the 97th United States Congress in the Chamber of the United States House of Representatives in the United States Capitol. Presiding over this joint session was the House speaker, Tip O'Neill, accompanied by George H. W. Bush, the vice president in his capacity as the president of the Senate.

The speech was referred to as the "Speech on the Program for Economic Recovery." During his speech, President Reagan outlined his plan for economic recovery, calling for large cuts to taxes and federal spending. Some observers described it at the time as the most comprehensive economic proposal since President Franklin D. Roosevelt announced his New Deal program in March 1933. When President Reagan handed House Speaker Tip O’Neill the printed copy, O’Neill reportedly said, "Mr. President, good luck."

Secretary of Education Terrel Bell was the designated survivor and did not attend the address in order to maintain a continuity of government.

No response to this address was given by the Democratic Party.

== See also ==
- First 100 days of the Reagan presidency
- List of joint sessions of the United States Congress
- Speeches and debates of Ronald Reagan

Preceded by 1981 State of the Union Address	State of the Union addresses 1981 joint session speech	Succeeded by 1982 State of the Union Address
