= Max Hugel =

American businessman and political figure

Max C. Hugel
- Hugel in 1988
- Born: May 23, 1925; The Bronx, New York
- Died: February 19, 2007 (aged 81); Ocala, Florida
- Education: University of Michigan
- Occupations: Communications executive, government administrator

Max C. Hugel (May 23, 1925 – February 19, 2007) was an American businessman and political figure. He worked on Ronald Reagan's 1980 presidential campaign, and briefly served as Deputy Director for Operations of the Central Intelligence Agency before resigning amidst allegations of improper stock trading. He later became a co-owner of the historic Rockingham Park in Salem, New Hampshire, and at the time of his death was chairman of Carmen Group, a Washington D.C. lobbying firm. He died of cancer at his home in Ocala, Florida, at the age of 81.

Hugel was born in the Bronx, New York, and was drafted into the U.S. Army at 18, serving from 1943 to 1947. He attended the Military Intelligence School at the University of Michigan, where he became fluent in Japanese, and became a first lieutenant in Military Intelligence. He graduated from the University of Michigan in 1953, and became president and CEO of Brother International Corporation from 1954 to 1975, and executive vice president and chief operating officer of Centronics Computer Corporation from 1975 to 1980. He was recruited by Ronald Reagan to assist in his New Hampshire primary campaign and later chaired the national voters group of the Reagan campaign. After Reagan's election, Hugel led the Small Business Administration during the presidential transition.

Hugel was a close friend of William J. Casey, the director of the CIA. Hugel joined the CIA in January 1981 as Casey's special assistant, and Casey later appointed him as Deputy Director for Operations, the head of the CIA's Clandestine Service. After reporters from the Washington Post published allegations by two former business associates of improper or illegal stock trading during Hugel's time with Brother International, Hugel resigned while denying the allegations. He later sued the two associates for libel, and won.

In 1983 Hugel joined with three business partners to purchase the Rockingham Park racetrack in New Hampshire and rebuild it following a fire. He was also a breeder and owner of racehorses.

Hugel was married and had four children.
