= Edward S. Miller =

FBI agent

- Born: Edward Samuel Miller; November 11, 1923; McKeesport, Pennsylvania, U.S.
- Died: July 1, 2013 (aged 89); Fairfax, Virginia, U.S.
- Occupation: FBI special agent
- Years active: 1950–1974
- Known for: 1980 trial of Conspiracy of injuring and oppressing the citizens of the United States and his investigation of the Weather Underground group
- Spouse: Patricia Clark (m. 1950)
- Children: 3

Edward Samuel Miller (November 11, 1923 – July 1, 2013) was the deputy assistant director of the Inspections Division under Mark Felt with the United States Federal Bureau of Investigation. He was known for the 1980 trial for conspiracy of injuring and oppressing the citizens of the United States and his investigation of the Weather Underground group.

== Military and FBI career ==
He served with the United States Army from November 1942 until February 1946 as platoon sergeant in the Battle of Okinawa during the Pacific Theater. He joined the FBI in February 1950 and served until October 1974.

== 1980 conviction and pardon ==
In November 1980, Miller, then head of the FBI's Domestic Intelligence Division, and Mark Felt were convicted after a seven-week federal jury trial of having "conspired to injure and oppress the citizens of the United States" and Miller was fined $3,500. While the convictions were being appealed in April 1981, President Ronald Reagan pardoned both men. At the time of trial, Felt and Miller were the highest-ranking bureau employees to have been tried for a criminal offense.

== Personal ==
He had been married to Patricia Clark since September 2, 1950. He left three children and numerous grandchildren and great-grandchildren. He died peacefully on July 1, 2013, in Fairfax, Virginia. He had been living in Fairfax since March 1962, when he moved from San Francisco to work with the FBI in Washington, D.C.

== See also ==
- John W. Nields Jr.
- List of people pardoned or granted clemency by the president of the United States
