= Quantitative analysis of behavior =

Quantitative analysis of behavior is the application of mathematical models to the experimental analysis of behavior. Its aim is to describe and/or predict relations between varying levels of independent environmental variables and dependent behavioral variables. The field was founded by Richard Herrnstein in 1961 when he introduced the matching law to quantify the behavior of organisms working on concurrent schedules of reinforcement.

The field has integrated models from economics, zoology, philosophy, political science (including voter behavior) and psychology, especially mathematical psychology of which it is a branch. The field is represented by the Society for Quantitative Analysis of Behavior. Quantitative analysis of behavior addresses the following topics among others: behavioral economics, behavioral momentum, connectionist systems or neural networks, integration, hyperbolic discounting including the delay reduction hypothesis, foraging, hunting, errorless learning, creativity, learning, and the Rescorla-Wagner model, matching law, melioration, scalar expectancy, signal detection, neural hysteresis, and reinforcement control.

== Concepts and models ==
- Matching law
- Rate of response
- Rate of reinforcement
- Mathematical principles of reinforcement
- Behavioral momentum
- Quantitative psychology

== Influential people in quantitative analysis of behavior ==
- John Anderson
- Michael Commons
- Robyn Dawes
- William Estes
- John Gibbon
- Richard Herrnstein
- Peter Richard Killeen
- R. Duncan Luce
- John Anthony Nevin
- Allen Newell
- Howard Rachlin
- Herbert A. Simon
- J. E. R. Staddon
