= Society for Quantitative Analysis of Behavior =

Behaviorist professional organization

The Society for the Quantitative Analyses of Behavior was founded in 1978 by Michael Lamport Commons and John Anthony Nevin. The first president was Richard J. Herrnstein. In the beginning it was called the Harvard Symposium on Quantitative Analysis of Behavior (HSQAB).

== Activities ==
This society meets once a year to discuss various topic in quantitative analysis of behavior including: behavioral economics, behavioral momentum, Connectionist systems or neural networks, hyperbolic discounting, foraging, errorless learning, learning and the Rescorla-Wagner model, matching law, Melioration, scalar expectancy, signal detection and stimulus control, connectionism or Neural Networks. Mathematical models and data are presented and discussed. The field is a branch of mathematical psychology. Some papers resulting from the symposium are published as a special issue of the journal Behavioural Processes.
