= John Gibbons (disambiguation) =

John Gibbons (born 1962) is an American baseball coach and former player

John Gibbons may also refer to:

== Politics and law ==
- Sir John Gibbons, 2nd Baronet (c. 1717–1776), British Member of Parliament for Stockbridge (1754–1761) and Wallingford (1761–1768)
- John Lloyd Gibbons (1837–1919), British Member of Parliament for Wolverhampton South (1898–1900)
- John H. Gibbons (mayor) (1869–1949), American Socialist politician
- John Joseph Gibbons (1924–2018), American judge
- John C. Gibbons (died 2021), Palauan politician

== Sports ==
- Sir John Gibbons, 4th Baronet (1774–1844), English MCC cricketer
- Tex Gibbons (John Haskell Gibbons, 1907–1984), American Olympic basketball player
- John Gibbons (pitcher) (1922–2008), American Negro league baseball player
- John Gibbons (footballer) (1925–2021), English footballer
- John Gibbons (rower) (born 1943), New Zealand representative rower

== Others ==
- John Gibbons (Jesuit) (1544–1589), English Jesuit theologian and controversialist
- John Gibbons (c. 1690), porter of Whitehall Palace and 'pursuer of coiners', see William Chaloner
- John H. Gibbons (naval officer) (1859–1944), captain in the United States Navy
- John H. Gibbons (scientist) (1929–2015), American scientist
- John Gibbons (activist), Irish environmentalist
- John Gibbons (DJ), Irish record producer
- John Gibbons (ironmaster), English ironmaster and art patron
- John Gibbons, conductor of Worthing Symphony Orchestra

== See also ==
- Jackie Gibbons (1914–1984), English football manager
- Jack Gibbons, musician
- John Gibbon (disambiguation)
