= John Gibbon (disambiguation) =

John Gibbon (1827–1896) was United States Army officer who fought in the American Civil War.

John Gibbon may also refer to:

- John Gibbon (judge) (1528–1595), judge and MP for Hindon (UK Parliament constituency), 1558
- John Gibbon (officer of arms) (1629–1718), English Bluemantle Pursuivant and writer on heraldry
- John Gibbon (British Army officer) (1917–1997)
- John Gibbon (psychologist) (1934–2001), Professor of psychology, son of John Heysham Gibbon
- John Heysham Gibbon (1903–1973), inventor of the heart-lung machine
- John Murray Gibbon (1875–1952), Scottish-Canadian writer
- John Gibbon (MP for Derby), represented Derby (UK Parliament constituency)
- John Gibbon (cricketer) (1847–1883), English cricketer and clergyman
- John Gibbon (footballer), see List of Bury F.C. players (1–24 appearances)

== See also ==
- John Gibbons (disambiguation)
