= David Passig =

Israeli futurist

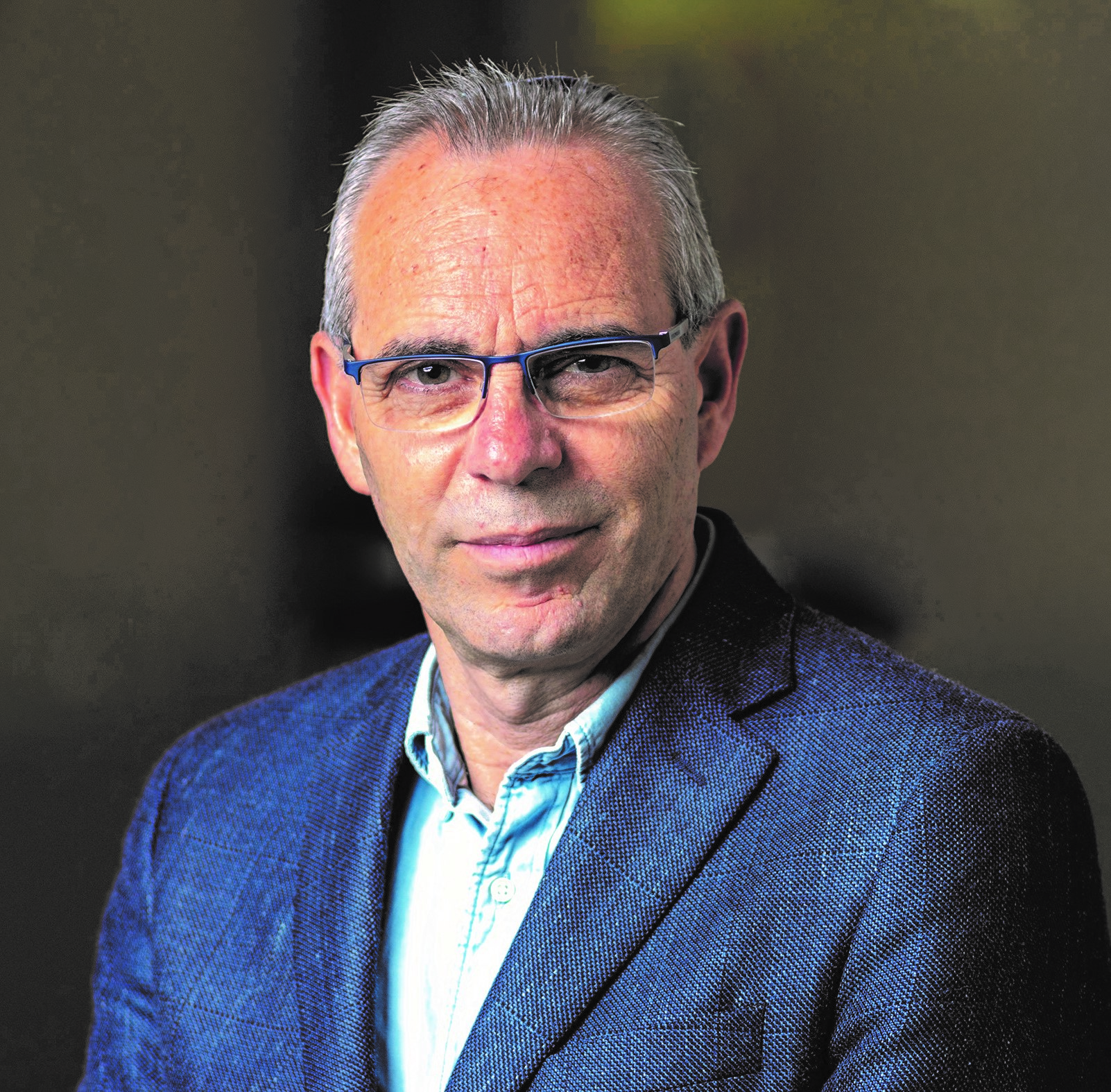
- Born: July 7, 1957 (age 68); Sefrou, Morocco
- Occupation: Futurist
- Known for: Predicting September 11 attacks

David Passig (born July 7, 1957) is an Israeli futurist. He specializes in technological, social, and educational futures. He is a full professor at the Bar-Ilan University in Israel. He heads the Graduate Program in Information and Communication Technology and the Virtual Reality Laboratory at the Faculty of Education.

== Biography ==
Passig was born as David Ben-Harosh in Meknes, Morocco, to a Jewish family. As a young child, his family immigrated to France, where he spent his early childhood. When Passig was 11, the family moved to Israel. Passig holds both Portuguese and Israeli nationalities.

In 1982, at age 25, Passig fought in the 1982 Lebanon War, during which many soldiers in his unit died after it was caught in a Syrian ambush and then accidentally attacked by Israeli warplanes. A number of his friends were among the casualties. According to Passig, this caused him to begin thinking heavily about the future, as he wondered whether Israel was fated to constantly fight. When he returned from the army, Passig took a vacation in Europe at the urging of his father. While in Brussels, he visited an exhibit on homes of the future and was intrigued by how the predictions were made. Although he was studying psychology at the time, he decided to enroll in an Anticipatory Anthropology course at the University of Minnesota. He received a PhD in Anticipatory Anthropology (Futures Studies) in 1993.

Passig, an Orthodox Jew, is divorced with four children and lives in Tel Aviv. He works as a Full Professor at the Faculty of Education at Bar-Ilan University, where he heads the university's MA program in information communication technologies in education and its virtual reality laboratory. He also works as a consultant and has advised Fortune 500 companies, science fiction film producers, and some Israeli government institutions, including the Ministry of Education, Bank Hapoalim, and the Israeli Air Force. He served as an adviser to the commissioner for future generations at the Knesset and is a member of the Israeli National Committee for Research and Development. He is a co-founder of Thinkz Ltd, a startup company developing Social IoT platforms and applications.

== Predictions ==
Passig's accurate predictions include the September 11 attacks. In the 1990s, he predicted that a terrorist attack would take place on a major symbol of world order in the early 21st century. Passig also predicted the 2008 financial crisis in 1998, when he said that there would be a global economic crisis that would start in either 2007 or 2008. He wrote about the coming financial crisis in his book The Future Code, which was written in 2006 and published a few months before the crisis started. Passig also accurately forecast major developments in wireless technology, Russia invasion to Ukraine and the Arab Spring.

Among his future predictions include Moore's law ending by 2017, a brain-powered personal computer by 2020, a commercial quantum computer by 2027, laboratory-grown human organs on demand by 2028, a space elevator by 2029, an artificially intelligent computer similar to the fictional HAL 9000 by 2047, an undersea city by 2068, cryonics reanimation by 2085, nanorgasm by 2089, and warp drive by 2095. He has contradicted widespread predictions of human colonization of space in the late 21st and 22nd century, and believes that humanity will not begin to seriously colonize space until the 23rd or 24th century.

== A Future Taxonomy of Cognitive skills ==
Passig has developed a taxonomy of future cognitive and learning skills. This taxonomy attempts to refresh Bloom's taxonomy of cognitive skills to reflect future needs and introduces a new thinking skill called melioration, the ability to solve a problem within one's own area of expertise using a concept from a widely divergent domain. This taxonomy is being taught worldwide at teachers' colleges and MBA programs. Passig and colleague Lizi Cohen developed the Innovative Combinations' Test, which attempts to measure melioration, as well as a training program called Thinking-Different.

== Imen Delphi ==
Passig has also developed a future research methodology named "Imen-Delphi" (ID). This methodology aims at structuring a procedure through which a group of experts could invent preferable futures, as opposed to the classical "Delphi" forecasting technique, in which a group of experts is engaged in figuring out the most probable future. He is conducting various case studies to enhance its reliability and validity in helping various groups shaping their future imageries. The following papers represent the ID methodology in the published literature:

- Passig, David & Sharbat, Aviva (2000) Electronic-Imen-Delphi (EID): An Online Conferencing Procedure. Education Media International (EMI). The official Journal of the International Council for Educational Media (ICEM) 37(1), 58–67. Routledge.
- Passig, David (1998). An applied Social Systems Procedure for Generating Purposive Sound Futures. Systems Research and Behavioral Science. The Official Journal of the International Federation for Systems Research. Winter 15(1), 315–325. Wiley & Sons. England.

== Enhancing Cognitive Skills with Virtual Reality ==
Passig established the Virtual Reality Laboratory at the School of Education at Bar-Ilan University, and is conducting studies on various aspects of the human user learning interface of virtual reality.

He is also studying the impact of ICT interfaces on various aspects of human cognition and social behavior as well as learning processes. Passig suggests that ICT interfaces have an unexpected impact on the user's awareness of a variety of cognitive phenomena, and that VR can enhance some cognitive skills. The following papers represent this ongoing endeavor:

- Eden, S. and Passig, D. (2007) Three-Dimensionality as an effective mode of Representation for Expressing Sequential Time Perception. Journal of Educational Computing Research. 36(1), 51–63.
- Passig, David, Klein, Pnina & Neuman, Talia (2001) Awareness to Toddlers’ Initial Cognitive Experiences with Virtual Reality. Journal of Computer Assisted Learning. 17(4), 332–344.
- Passig, David and Levin, Haya (2000). Gender Preferences for Multimedia Interfaces. Journal of Computer Assisted Learning. 16(1), 64–71. Blackwell Science.
- Passig, David & Eden, Sigal (2000) Enhancing the Induction Skill of Deaf and Hard-of-Hearing Children with Virtual Reality Technology. Journal of Deaf Studies and Deaf Education. 5(3), 277–285. Oxford University Press.
- Passig, David and Eden, Sigal (2000) Improving the Flexible Thinking in Deaf and Hard of Hearing Children with Virtual Reality Technology. American Annals of the Deaf. 145(3), 286–291.

== Books ==
- 1. Passig, David (2008) The Future Code: Israel's Future-Test. Tel Aviv, Yediot Press (in Hebrew). Publisher's site of the book Book received the Gold Prize. 16 predictions about Israel in four categories: Social, national security, economics and national identity.
- 2. Passig, David (2010) 2048. Tel Aviv, Yediot Press (in Hebrew). Publisher's site of the book Possible conflicts of the 21st century, the technologies that will drive these confrontations and how they will be reflected in the Middle east up to the mid 21st century.
- 3. Passig, David (2011). Iki Bin Elli. Coton Kitap Publication: Istanbul. Turkish translation of 2048, renamed 2050. Turkish Publisher
- 4. Passig, David (2013). 2048. Tel Aviv: Yediot Press. English translation.
- 5. Passig, David (2013). Forecognito — the Future Mind. Tel Aviv: Yediot Press. Hebrew. Publisher's site of the book the neurophysiological mechanism of Futures Thinking. He suggests that the mind is in the midst of an accelerated evolutionary process in which a variety of cognitive skills are enhanced. Includes a meta-analysis of studies regarding the way to enhance a variety of IQ skills with Virtual Reality.
- 6. Passig, David (2021). "The Fifth Fiasco - How to escape the traps of Jewish History in the twenty-first century." Tel Aviv: Yediot Press. Hebrew המפלה החמישית - דוד פסיג | ידיעות ספרים שאוהבים
