= The Big Mo (book) =

The Big Mo: Why Momentum Rules Our World
- First edition (Australia)
- Author: Mark Roeder
- Language: English, Chinese
- Publisher: Virgin Books (Random House), Harper Collins
- Publication date: 2011
- Publication place: Australia, United Kingdom, China
- Media type: Print (Hardback)
- Pages: 300
- ISBN: 0753539373 (first edition)
- OCLC: 555723
- Dewey Decimal: 302 22
- LC Class: HM1043 .G63 4201

The Big Mo: Why Momentum Rules Our World is a book by Mark Roeder, first published by HarperCollins in 2011 It explores the phenomenon of large-scale momentum and how it impacts society.

== Overview ==
The book suggests that the rapid integration of digital technologies, communications and markets, has accelerated the velocity at which events unfold – and generates momentum on a massive scale (Big Mo). Roeder warns, 'As our world becomes more efficient and automated, there is less ‘friction’ to slow the momentum, which can lead to catastrophic results.’ The book examines the impact of Big Mo on finance, media, politics, wars, religion and science. Roeder, an ex-executive at UBS, bank, argues that momentum played an instrumental role in the 2008 financial crisis, and that it distorted decision-making in the lead up to the second Iraq War. He suggests that momentum ‘has become the zeitgeist of our time’

== Key concepts ==
- The momentum effect has recently become more powerful and pervasive, driven by rapid advances in technology and the integration of global systems.

- When momentum increases to a critical level, it creates a Big Mo effect that is self perpetuating and difficult to slow down or stop.

- Paradoxically, organisations and networks that are highly integrated and efficient are most susceptible to Big Mo. This is because momentum feeds on internal efficiency to accelerate and magnify its impact – there is little ‘friction’ to slow it down. Hence, the global financial system – which is now highly integrated and driven by automated computer-based trading systems (algorithms) – is particularly vulnerable to the momentum effect.

- The momentum-driven environment causes people and organisations to become ‘swept up in the flow’. It also encourages people to behave opportunistically, with less regard for the longer-term consequences of their actions. As Roeder explains, ‘They become ‘momentum surfers’ who are willing to ride the wave rather than question its direction.’

== Reception ==
The Big Mo was described by the Financial Times as ‘A compelling book that journeys seamlessly from finances to the Iraq war, from oil prices and climate change to religion and pop culture in an effort to explain how we behave and why we are so easily led.’ The Australian broadcaster Phillip Adams, wrote, ‘In our personal, political and economic lives we seem to be swept along by circumstances. Our attempts to change direction are doomed. The Big Mo explains why.’

The Guardian’s Steven Poole criticized the book for 'overstretching the Newtonian-physics analogy'. Steven Matcham, writing in The Australian, said, ‘Speed and size define the events of our age. As news travels ever faster, its impact increases. The strength of [Roeder’s] book is the idea that momentum’s effects can be felt right across society, including in the media, where 15 minutes of fame is possible on a scale unimaginable a decade ago.’

The Big Mo was first published by HarperCollins Australia (2011), Random House (Virgin books) UK, Europe & USA (2011) and Xinhua Publishing House, Beijing, China (2012).

== See also ==
- Momentum
- Bandwagon effect
- Critical mass
- Domino effect
- Network effect
- Virtuous circle and vicious circle
