= Geek =

Expert or enthusiast obsessed with a hobby or intellectual pursuit

A man dressed in cosplay at a geek convention. Geeks often outwardly express interest in their hobbies and fandoms.

A geek is a person seen as eccentric, awkward, and non-mainstream. In contemporary usage, the term more specifically refers to someone who is obsessed with a particular hobby or intellectual pursuit.

Historically, the word had a generally pejorative meaning, describing a "peculiar person, especially one who is perceived to be overly intellectual, unfashionable, boring, or socially awkward". In the 21st century, the term was reclaimed and increasingly used by people to describe themselves with pride, particularly within fandoms. This newer definition typically refers to "someone who is interested in a subject (usually intellectual or complex) for its own sake". The term is sometimes, though not always, used as a synonym for nerd.

== Etymology ==
The word comes from geek or geck 'fool, freak' in early 1900s American carnival slang, possibly from Middle Low German Geck. Geck is a standard term in Modern German and means 'fool; fop'. The root also survives in the Dutch and Afrikaans adjective gek 'crazy', as well as some German dialects, like the Alsatian word Gickeleshut 'jester's hat' (used during carnival). In 18th-century Austria, Gecken were freaks on display in some circuses. In 19th-century North America, the term geek referred to a performer in a geek show in a circus, traveling carnival or travelling funfair sideshows (see also freak show). The 1976 edition of the American Heritage Dictionary included only the definition regarding geek shows. This is the sense of geek in William Lindsay Gresham's 1946 novel Nightmare Alley, twice adapted for the screen in 1947 and 2021.

== Definitions ==
The 1975 edition of the American Heritage Dictionary, published a decade before the Digital Revolution, gave only one definition: "Geek [noun, slang]. A carnival performer whose act usually consists of biting the head off a live chicken or snake." The tech revolution found new uses for this word, but it still often conveys a derogatory sting. In 2017, Dictionary.com gave five definitions, the fourth of which is "a carnival performer who performs sensationally morbid or disgusting acts, as biting off the head of a live chicken."

The term nerd has a similar, practically synonymous meaning as geek, but many choose to identify different connotations among these two terms, although the differences are disputed. In a 2007 interview on The Colbert Report, Richard Clarke said the difference between nerds and geeks is "geeks get it done" or "ggid". Julie Smith defined a geek as "a bright young man turned inward, poorly socialized, who felt so little kinship with his own planet that he routinely traveled to the ones invented by his favorite authors, who thought of that secret, dreamy place his computer took him to as cyberspace—somewhere exciting, a place more real than his own life, a land he could conquer, not a drab teenager's room in his parents' house."

== Impact ==
Technologically oriented geeks, in particular, now exert a powerful influence over the global economy and society. Whereas previous generations of geeks tended to operate in research departments, laboratories and support functions, now they increasingly occupy senior corporate positions, and wield considerable commercial and political influence. When U.S. President Barack Obama met with Facebook's Mark Zuckerberg and the CEOs of the world's largest technology firms at a private dinner in Woodside, California on February 17, 2011, New York magazine ran a story titled "The world's most powerful man meets President Obama". At the time, Zuckerberg's company had grown to over one billion users.

According to Mark Roeder the rise of the geek represents a new phase of human evolution. In his book, Unnatural Selection: Why The Geeks Will Inherit The Earth he suggests that "the high-tech environment of the Anthropocene favours people with geek-like traits, many of whom are on the autism spectrum or have ADHD or dyslexia. Previously, such people may have been at a disadvantage, but now their unique cognitive traits enable some of them to resonate with the new technological zeitgeist and become very successful."

The Economist magazine observed, on June 2, 2012, "Those square pegs (geeks) may not have an easy time in school. They may be mocked by jocks and ignored at parties. But these days no serious organisation can prosper without them."

== Fashion ==
"Geek chic" refers to a minor fashion trend that arose in the mid 2000s (decade), in which young people adopted "geeky" fashions, such as oversized black horn-rimmed glasses or browline glasses, suspenders/braces, and capri pants. The glasses quickly became the defining aspect of the trend, with the media identifying various celebrities as "trying geek" or "going geek" for wearing such glasses, such as David Beckham and Justin Timberlake. Meanwhile, in the sports world, many NBA players wore "geek glasses" during post-game interviews, drawing comparisons to Steve Urkel.

The term "geek chic" was appropriated by some self-identified "geeks" to refer to a new, socially acceptable role in a technologically advanced society.

== See also ==
- Akiba-kei – Japanese slang term for Akihabara style and Otaku – Someone highly interested in anime and manga, Japanese slang
- Anorak – Slang term for someone with an interest in niche subjects and Boffin – British slang term, British slang
- Battleboarding – Type of online activity
- Dweeb
- Furry – Subculture interested in anthropomorphic animals
- Gamer – Person who plays games
- Gamer girl – Women as makers and consumers of video games
- Geek Code – Letters and symbols used by geeks to describe themselves
- Geek girl – Gendered subgenre
- Geek Pride Day – Commemorative day
- Geek rock – Genre of rock music
- Geekcorps – Non-profit organization
- Girl Geek Dinners – Series of informal meetups for women in the technology industry
- Greaser – 1950s and 60s youth subculture in the United States
- Grok – Neologism coined by Robert Heinlein
- Internet culture – Culture that has emerged from the use of computer networks
- Jock – Stereotype of an athlete
- Neckbeard (slang) – Pejorative term and stereotype for men
- Nerd – Type of person
- Preppy – Modern, widespread subculture in the United States
- Trekkie – Fan of the Star Trek franchise
- Video game culture – Worldwide subculture
