= Jessica Zhu =

Chinese-American pianist

Jessica Zhu (born October 22, 1986) is a Chinese-American pianist who is currently undertaking a doctorate in musical arts (DMA) under the supervision of Paul Roberts and Caroline Rae at the Guildhall School of Music and Drama, in London. She previously received a Master in Performance (MPerf) and an Artist Diploma with distinction from the Guildhall, where she studied with full scholarship as a 2009 Marshall Scholar.

== Early life and education ==
Zhu was born in Shanghai, China, where she began her musical study.

At age 11, she moved with her family to Sugar Land, Texas, near Houston, where she studied piano for six years with John Weems. After graduating Stephen F. Austin High School in Sugar Land, she completed her undergraduate studies in 2009 summa cum laude from the University of Houston (Moores School of Music), where she studied with renowned pianist-pedagogue Nancy Weems.

Zhu has been invited to participate in master classes of pianists such as Pascal Rogé, Angela Hewitt, Anton Kuerti, Stanislav Ioudenitch, Antonio Pompa-Baldi, Peter Frankl, Abbey Simon, Yoheved Kaplinsky, and Nelita True.

== Concerts and performances ==
Zhu made her debut at age 19 in 2006 with the Houston Symphony in Jones Hall. She gave her debut recital in Zilkha Hall of the Hobby Center for the Performing Arts in downtown Houston.

In April 2010, Zhu performed with the Worthing Symphony Orchestra in Sussex, England, under the baton of John Gibbons.

Zhu has also performed recitals for the Rockport Performing Arts Series in Rockport, Texas, the San Antonio Tuesday Musical Club, Missouri State University Fite Family Music Festival Young Artist Series, the McKinney Musical Arts Society in Dallas, the Wichita Falls Symphony League's First Night in the Falls Arts Festival.

Zhu has also performed at the Texas Music Festival, Aspen Summer Festival in Colorado and the Banff Arts Centre in Canada. She has been featured on ABC Television Network KTRK Channel-13 Visions program and KUHF 88.7 FM radio The Front Row arts magazine.

== Competitions and prizes ==
- Silver medalist in the 2004 Junior Isabel Scionti Piano Solo Competition.
- Grand-prize winner of the Texas Entergy Young Artist Competition in 2006
- First prize winner of the 2008 San Antonio Tuesday Musical Club Young Artist Competition
- National Winner of the Young Artist Piano Competition of the 2008 Music Teachers National Association piano competitions in Denver, for which she received a Steinway & Sons grand piano.
- Laureate of the Sussex International Piano Competition 2010, receiving Third Prize and the Audience Prize.
- First prize at the Hastings International Piano Concerto Competition 2011.
