= Ter-Antonyan function =

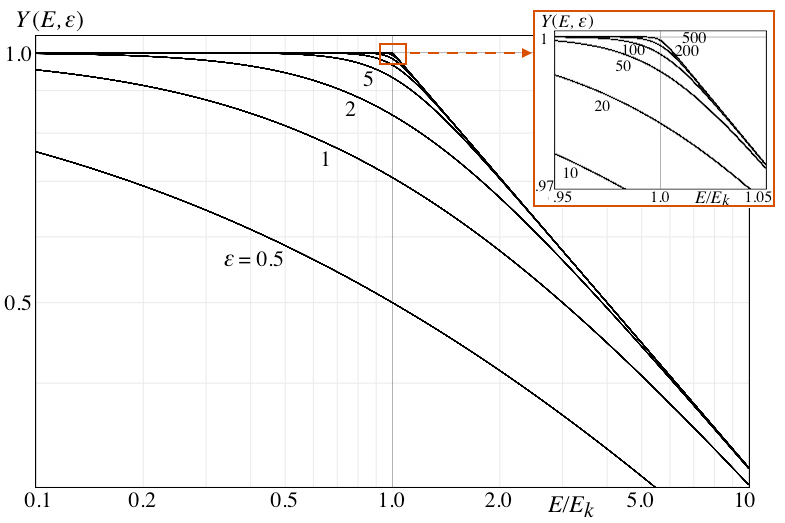
Example of the "knee" shaping function

The Ter-Antonyan function parameterizes the energy spectra of primary cosmic rays in the "knee" region ($10^{15}-10^{17}$ eV) by the continuously differentiable function of energy $E$ taking into account the rate of change of spectral slope. The function is expressed as:

$\frac{dF}{dE} = \Phi E^{-\gamma_1}\left(1+\left(\frac{E}{E_{k}}\right)^{\epsilon}\right)^{\frac{\gamma_1-\gamma_2}{\epsilon}}$,

1

where $\Phi$ is a scale factor, $\gamma_1$ and $\gamma_2$ are the asymptotic slopes of the function (or spectral slopes) in a logarithmic scale at $E\ll E_k$ and $E\gg E_k$ respectively for a given $E_k$ energy (the so-called "knee" energy). The rate of change of spectral slopes is set in function (1) by the "sharpness of knee" parameter, $\epsilon>0$. Function (1) was proposed in ANI'98 Workshop (1998) by Samvel Ter-Antonyan for both the interpolation of primary energy spectra in the energy range 1—100 PeV and the search of parametrized solutions of inverse problem to reconstruct primary cosmic ray energy spectra. Function (1) is also used for the interpolation of observed Extensive Air Shower spectra in the knee region.

Function (1) can be re-written as:

$\frac{dF}{dE} = \Phi E^{-\gamma_1}Y(E,\epsilon,\Delta\gamma),$

where $\Delta\gamma=\gamma_2-\gamma_1$ and

$Y(E,\epsilon,\Delta\gamma)\equiv\left(1+\left(\frac{E}{E_{k}}\right)^{\epsilon}\right)^{-\frac{\Delta\gamma}{\epsilon}}$

is the "knee" shaping function describing the change of the spectral slope. Examples of $Y(E,\epsilon,\Delta\gamma=0.5)$ for $\epsilon\equiv0.5, 1, 2, \cdots 500$ are presented above.

The rate of change of spectral slope from $-\gamma_1$ to $-\gamma_2$ with respect to energy ($E$) is derived from (1) as:

$\frac{df(E)}{dx}=-\gamma_1-\frac{\Delta\gamma}{1+(E_k/E)^\epsilon}$,

where

$f=\ln\left(\frac{dF}{dE}\right)$,

$x=\ln(\frac{E}{E_k})$,

and

$\left(\frac{df}{dx}\right)_{E=E_k}=-\frac{\gamma_1+\gamma_2}{2}$

is the sharpness-independent spectral slope at the knee energy.

Function (1) coincides with B. Peters spectra for $\epsilon=1$ and asymptotically approaches the broken power law of cosmic ray energy spectra for $\epsilon\gg1$:

$\left(\frac{dF}{dE}\right)_{\epsilon=\infin}\propto\left(\frac{E}{E_k}\right)^{-\gamma}$,

where

$$\gamma=
\begin{cases}
\gamma_1, & \text{if } E<E_k\\
\gamma_2, & \text{if } E>E_k.
\end{cases}$$
