= John Gibbon (psychologist) =

American psychologist

John Gibbon (born in Philadelphia on February 12, 1934) was a psychology professor at Columbia University. He was the son of John Heysham Gibbon. His contributions to scalar timing (1971) and scalar expectancy theory (1977) are considered major theoretical contributions. Together with Russell Church and Warren Meck he published the scalar timing model (1984). He died in Ossining, New York, on January 16, 2001.
