= Fantino (disambiguation) =

Fantino is a city in the Dominican Republic. The name may also be used for:

== Geography ==
- Monte Fantino is a mountain in the Ligurian Alps.

== Music ==
- An instrumental tune by Sébastien Tellier, originally released on his debut album L'incroyable Vérité, that featured on the soundtrack of the 2003 film Lost in Translation

== People ==
Given name

- Saint Fantinus (local Italian Santo Fantino), two incumbents

Last name

- Alejandro Fantino, Argentine TV host
- Edmund Fantino, American psychologist
- Julian Fantino, commissioner of the Ontario provincial Police
