= High probability instruction =

The high probability instruction (HPI) treatment is a behaviorist treatment based on the idea of positive reinforcement. It consists of the idea of reinforcing an instruction with a low probability of compliance by using the reinforcement of an instruction with a high probability.

== Sources ==
- Luce Doze (2005), under the direction of Ph.D Esteve Freixa i Bacquet (University of Picardie, France) and Mrs. Rivière (University of Lille-III, France). Treatment by HPI of an autistic child - Un exemple de complémentarité recherche fondamentale / pratique clinique à partir d'un cas d'enfant autiste (An example of complementarity between fundamental research and clinical practice from an autistic child case). Results shown at the 2005 seminar of the Association Picardie de Pratiques Cognitives et Comportementales (Picard Association of Cognitive and Behaviorist Practices).
- Ardoin, S. P., Martens, B. K., & Wolfe, L. A. (1999). Using high-probability instruction sequences with fading to increase student compliance during transitions. Journal of Applied Behavior Analysis, 32, 339-351.
