= Warren Meck =

American professor (1956–2020)

- Born: November 17, 1956; Schuylkill Haven, Pennsylvania, United States

Academic background
- Education: Brown University
- Thesis: Selective adjustment of the speed of internal clock and memory processes (1982)
- Doctoral advisor: Russell Church

Warren H. Meck (17 November 1956 – 21 January 2020) was an American Professor of Psychology and Neuroscience at Duke University. He is known for his interest in interval-timing mechanisms and subjective time perception.

== Education ==
Meck began his undergraduate studies at Pennsylvania State University, but left and completed his education at the University of California, San Diego, obtaining his BA in psychology there. While studying, he was also writing. He completed and published his debut research work in 1979. Meck then went to Brown University, and began his doctoral education with Russell Church as his advisor, eventually graduating with a PhD degree in 1982. After finishing his degree, Meck began full-time work as a research scientist at Brown. He moved to Columbia University and worked as an assistant professor in 1985 until his promotion as an associate professor in 1990. Following his anointment, he became a full professor in 2001 after working in the psychology department at Duke University in 1994.

== Career ==
Meck was the editor-in-chief of the journal of Timing & Time Perception. His work was recognized by an award from the Eastern Psychological Association (EPA) in 1994, and the James McKeen Cattell Sabbatical Fellowship in 2002. His work appeared in notable research magazines and periodicals, including The New York Times.

Meck's work in the field of timing and time perception stretched over about half a century. He formed the interval timing community "TIMELY" as well as the Timing & Time Perception journal. Based on this, he was among the people who founded the Timing Research Forum (TRF). His research was praised as a "creative empirical and theoretical research, grounded in independent thought and openness to new and sometimes disruptive ideas, led to many conceptual leaps that strongly shaped the shifts in the zeitgeist."

== Memorial and legacy ==
John C. Neill, an associate professor of psychology at Long Island University, praised Meck as "uniquely self-reliant." Patricia Agostino and Diego Golombek, lecturers at the National University of Quilmes in Argentina said he was "an excellent scientist and a truly exceptional person."

Meck was married; he died on January 21, 2020 at the age of 63.

== Selected works ==
- Meck, W. H., & Church, R. M. (1983). A mode control model of counting and timing processes. Journal of Experimental Psychology: Animal Behavior Processes, 9(3), 320.
- Meck, W. H. (1996). Neuropharmacology of timing and time perception. Cognitive brain research, 3(3), 227–242.
- Gibbon, J., Church, R. M., & Meck, W. H. (1984). Scalar timing in memory. Annals of the New York Academy of sciences, 423(1), 52–77.
- Buhusi, Catalin V., and Warren H. Meck. "What makes us tick? Functional and neural mechanisms of interval timing." Nature Reviews Neuroscience 6.10 (2005): 755–765.
- Meck, Warren H. "Selective adjustment of the speed of internal clock and memory processes." Journal of Experimental Psychology: Animal Behavior Processes 9.2 (1983): 171.
- Yin, B., & Meck, W. H. (2014). Comparison of interval timing behaviour in mice following dorsal or ventral hippocampal lesions with mice having δ-opioid receptor gene deletion. Philosophical Transactions of the Royal Society of London B: Biological Sciences, 369(1637), 20120466.
- Coull, J. T., Cheng, R. K., & Meck, W. H. (2011). Neuroanatomical and neurochemical substrates of timing. Neuropsychopharmacology, 36(1), 3-25.

== Bibliography ==
- Balci, Fuat; Vatakis, Argiro; Gu, Bon-Mi (March 27, 2023). "Remembering Warren H. Meck". Timing & Time Perception. 11 (1–4). Brill: 1–13. doi:10.1163/22134468-20230001. ISSN 2213-445X.
- "Duke Flags Lowered: Psychology Professor Warren Meck Dies". Duke Today. January 23, 2020.
- "Warren Meck, PhD – FABBS". FABBS. February 12, 2020.
- "Timing & Time Perception". brill.com. December 19, 2013. Archived from the original on July 30, 2013.
