= Behavioral momentum =

Theory in psychology

Behavioral momentum is a theory in quantitative analysis of behavior and is a behavioral metaphor based on physical momentum. It describes the general relation between resistance to change (persistence of behavior) and the rate of reinforcement obtained in a given situation.

B. F. Skinner (1938) proposed that all behavior is based on a fundamental unit of behavior called the discriminated operant. The discriminated operant, also known as the three-term contingency, has three components: an antecedent discriminative stimulus, a response, and a reinforcing or punishing consequence. The organism responds in the presence of the stimulus because past responses in the presence of that stimulus have produced reinforcement.

== Resistance to change ==
According to behavioral momentum theory, there are two separable factors that independently govern the rate with which a discriminated operant occurs and the persistence of that response in the face of disruptions such as punishment, extinction, or the differential reinforcement of alternative behaviors. (see Nevin & Grace, 2000, for a review). First, the positive contingency between the response and a reinforcing consequence controls response rates (i.e., a response–reinforcer relation) by shaping a particular pattern of responding. This is governed by the relative law of effect (i.e., the matching law; Herrnstein, 1970). Secondly, the Pavlovian relation between surrounding, or context, stimuli and the rate or magnitude (but not both) of reinforcement obtained in the context (i.e., a stimulus–reinforcer relation) governs the resistance of the behavior to operations such as extinction. Resistance to change is assessed by measuring responding during operations such as extinction or satiation that tend to disrupt the behavior and comparing these measurements to stable, pre-disruption response rates.

Resistance to disruption has been considered a better measure of response strength than a simple measure of response rate.(Nevin, 1974). This is because variations in reinforcement contingencies such as differential-reinforcement-of-high- or low-response-rate schedules can yield highly variable response rates even though overall reinforcement rates are equal. Thus it is questionable whether these differences in response rates indicate differences in the underlying strength of a response (see Morse, 1966, for a discussion).

According to behavioral momentum theory, the relation between response rate and resistance to change is analogous to the relation between velocity and mass of a moving object, according to Newton's second law of motion (Nevin, Mandell & Atak, 1983). Newton's second law states that the change in velocity of an object when a force is applied is directly related to that force and inversely related to the object's mass. Similarly, behavioral momentum theory states that the change in response rate under conditions of disruption (Bx) relative to baseline response rate (Bo) is directly related to the force or magnitude of disruption (f) and inversely related to the rate of reinforcement in a stimulus context (r):

$\log{\left({Bx\over Bo}\right)}\ = \ -\left({f\over r^b}\right)$ (1)

The free parameter b indicates the sensitivity of resistance to change to the rate of reinforcement in the stimulus context (i.e., the stimulus–reinforcer relation). Resistance to disruption typically is assessed when two distinctive discriminative stimulus contexts alternate and signal different schedules of reinforcement (i.e., a multiple schedule). Equation 1 can be rewritten to account for resistance to change across two stimulus contexts (Nevin, 1992; Nevin, Grace, & McLean, 2001) when a disrupter is uniformly applied across contexts (i.e., f_{1} = f_{2}):

${ {\log(Bx_1/Bo_1)} \over{\log(Bx_2/Bo_2)} }\ = \ \left({r_2\over r_1}\right)^a$ (2)

The subscripts indicate the different stimulus contexts. Thus, Equation 2 states that relative resistance to change is a power function of the relative rate of reinforcement across stimulus contexts, with the a parameter indicating sensitivity to relative reinforcement rate. Consistent with behavioral momentum theory, resistance to disruption often has been found to be greater in stimulus contexts that signal higher rates or magnitudes of reinforcement (see Nevin, 1992, for a review). Studies that add response-independent (i.e., free) reinforcement to one stimulus context strongly support the theory that changes in response strength are determined by stimulus–reinforcer relations and are independent of response–reinforcer relations. For instance, Nevin, Tota, Torquato, and Shull (1990) had pigeons pecking lighted disks on separate variable-interval 60-s schedules of intermittent food reinforcement across two components of a multiple schedule. Additional free reinforcers were presented every 15 or 30 s on average when the disk was red, but not when the disk was green. Thus, the response–reinforcer relation was degraded when the disk was red because each reinforcer was not immediately preceded by a response. Consistent with the matching law, response rates were lower in the red context than in the green context. However, the stimulus–reinforcer relation was enhanced in the red context because the overall rate of food presentation was greater. Consistent with behavioral momentum theory, resistance to presession feeding (satiation) and discontinuing reinforcement in both contexts (extinction) was greater in the red context. Similar results have been found when reinforcers are added to a context by reinforcing an alternative response.

The findings of Nevin et al. (1990) have been extended across a number of procedures and species including goldfish (Igaki & Sakagami, 2004), rats (Harper, 1999a, 1999b; Shull, Gaynor & Grimes, 2001), pigeons (Podlesnik & Shahan, 2008), and humans (Ahearn, Clark, Gardenier, Chung & Dube, 2003; Cohen, 1996; Mace et al., 1990). The behavioral momentum framework also has been used to account for the partial-reinforcement extinction effect (Nevin & Grace, 1999), to assess the persistence of drug-maintained behavior (Jimenez-Gomez & Shahan, 2007; Shahan & Burke, 2004), to increase task compliance (e.g., Belfiore, Lee, Scheeler & Klein, 2002), and to understand the effects of social policies on global problems (Nevin, 2005).

Although behavioral momentum theory is a powerful framework for understanding how a context of reinforcement can affect the persistence of discriminated operant behavior, there are a number of findings that are inconsistent with the theory (see Nevin & Grace, 2000, and accompanying commentary). For instance, with equal reinforcement rates across stimulus contexts, resistance to change has been shown to be affected by manipulations to response–reinforcer relations, including schedules that produce different baseline response rates (e.g., Lattal, 1989; Nevin, Grace, Holland & McLean), delays to reinforcement (e.g., Bell, 1999; Grace, Schwendimann & Nevin, 1998; Podlesnik, Jimenez-Gomez, Ward & Shahan, 2006; Podlesnik & Shahan, 2008), and by providing brief stimuli that accompany reinforcement (Reed & Doughty, 2005). Also, it is unclear what factors affect relative resistance to change of responding maintained by conditioned reinforcement (Shahan & Podlesnik, 2005) or two concurrently available responses when different rates of reinforcement are arranged within the same context for those responses (e.g., Bell & Williams, 2002).

== Preference and resistance to change ==
As resistance to disruption across stimulus contexts is analogous to the inertial mass of a moving object, behavioral momentum theory also suggests that preference in concurrent-chains procedures for one stimulus context over another is analogous to the gravitational attraction of two bodies (see Nevin & Grace, 2000). In concurrent-chains procedures, responding on the concurrently available initial links provides access to one of two mutually exclusive stimulus contexts called terminal links. As with multiple schedules, independent schedules of reinforcement can function in each terminal-link context. The relative allocation of responding across the two initial links indicates the extent to which an organism prefers one terminal-link context over the other. Moreover, behavioral momentum theory posits that preference provides a measure of the relative conditioned-reinforcing value of the two terminal-link contexts, as described by the contextual-choice model (Grace, 1994).

Grace and Nevin (1997) assessed both relative resistance to change in a multiple schedule and preference in a concurrent-chains procedure with pigeons pecking lighted disks for food reinforcement. When the relative rate of reinforcement was manipulated identically and simultaneously across stimulus contexts in the multiple schedule and concurrent-chains procedure, both relative resistance to change and preference was greater with richer contexts of reinforcement. When all the extant resistance to change and preference data were summarized by Grace, Bedell, and Nevin (2002), they found that those measures were related by a structural relation slope of 0.29. Therefore, relative resistance to change and preference both have been conceptualized as expressions of an underlying construct termed response strength, conditioned reinforcement value, or more generally, behavioral mass of discriminated operant behavior (see Nevin & Grace, 2000).
