= The Big Mo =

Behavioral momentum on a large scale

The Big Mo ("Big Momentum") is behavioral momentum that operates on a large scale. The concept originally applied to sporting events in the 1960s in the United States, as momentum appeared to have an effect on a team's performance. Successful teams were said to have "The Big Mo" on their side. This has since extended situations in which momentum is a driving factor, such as during political campaigns, social upheavals, economic cycles, and financial bubbles.

== In modern history ==
The term was used by George H. W. Bush during his quest for the Republican nomination to run for President in 1980. After he won the Iowa caucuses, and was facing further contests, Bush Senior said: "Now they will be after me, howling and yowling at my heels. What we will have is momentum. We will look forward to Big Mo being on our side, as they say in athletics."

Eventually, Bush lost to Ronald Reagan who went on to become the 40th President of the United States, with Bush as his Vice President.

== Impact ==
Research conducted in 2005, by Christopher Hull at Georgetown University, US, suggested that from 1980 to 2000, "Big Mo" (large scale momentum) had amplified key events in US presidential races.

In 2007, three researchers from the London Business School, Elroy Dimson, Paul Marsh and Mike Staunton, observed in their paper "108 Years of Momentum Profits" that "momentum appears to have an inordinate and unexplained impact on the behaviour of investment markets that contradicts the efficient market theory". One of the researchers, Dr Paul Marsh said, "We remain puzzled (by these findings) and we are not the only ones; most academics are vaguely embarrassed by this."

In the lead-up to the British election in May 2010, James Forsyth, the political editor of The Spectator magazine, wrote, "The Big Mo is with the Tories. In a campaign, momentum matters. It is, for good or ill, the prism through which the media report things."

In 2010, an analysis conducted by Mark Roeder, a former executive at the Swiss-based UBS Bank, suggested that Big Mo "played a pivotal role" in the 2008 financial crisis. Roeder suggested that,

recent technological advances, such as computer-driven trading programs, together with the increasingly interconnected nature of markets, has magnified the momentum effect. This effect is not limited to the financial markets. It can be felt across other aspects of society, particularly in politics, business, technology and the media where Big Mo now operates on a massive scale.

In January 2011, a report in The Economist magazine, titled "The Big Mo", said,

The momentum effect drives a juggernaut through one of the tenets of finance theory, the efficient-market hypothesis... Even the high priests of efficient-market theory have acknowledged [its impact]. Well-paid fund managers have spent decades trying to find ways to beat the market. But you have to wonder why they bother devoting so much money and effort to researching the fortunes of individual companies when the momentum approach appears to be easy to exploit and has been around for a long time... The momentum effect raises a further important issue. If markets are rational, as the efficient-market hypothesis assumed, then they will allocate capital to its most productive uses. But the momentum effect suggests that an irrationality might be at work; investors could be buying shares (and commodities) just because they have risen in price. That would help explain why bubbles are created and why professional investors ended up allocating capital to dotcom companies with no earnings and business plans written on the back of a cigarette packet. Momentum can carry whole economies off track.

== Theoretical analysis ==
The mechanism by which momentum influences human behaviour on a large scale is not known, but a number of theories exist. In 1982, a research team led by John Nevin, Professor Emeritus of Psychology at the University of New Hampshire, US, together with Charlotte Mandel and Jean Atak, wrote a paper called "The Analysis of Behavioural Momentum", in which they explored why certain behaviours can become persistent over time. The team proposed that people's tendency to continue to behave in a certain way, and resist change, is dependent on the type of reinforcement they receive. The team developed a method for calculating the impact of behavioural momentum, based on the Newtonian formula: ΔV = f / m, in which ΔV is the change in velocity or, in behavioural terms, response rate; Velocity (V) refers to the response rate; mass (m) refers to the response strength, and force (f) refers to the change in the contingencies for the behaviour (i.e., environment change). The work of Nevin, Mandel and Atak has been influential in the development of social and health-care policies, such as drug rehabilitation programs, where behavioural persistence (momentum) and relapse are critical issues.

More controversial theories about behavioural momentum derive from quantum physics and quantum field theory. In her book The Field, author Lyn McTaggart cites experiments that show that in certain group environments that, "each member of the group becomes less highly-tuned to their own separate information and more receptive to that of other group members. In effect, they pick up someone else's information from the 'field' as if it were their own". She says this phenomenon is akin to what sports teams experience when they "enter the zone" and are influenced by momentum.

== See also ==
- Behavioral momentum
- Bandwagon effect
- Critical mass
- Domino effect
- Network effect
- Virtuous circle and vicious circle
