= Tex Gibbons =

American basketball player (1907–1984)

Personal information
- Born: October 7, 1907 Elk City, Oklahoma Territory, U.S.
- Died: May 30, 1984 (aged 76) La Habra, California, U.S.
- Listed height: 6 ft 1 in (1.85 m)
- Listed weight: 175 lb (79 kg)

Career information
- College: Southwestern (Kansas)
- Position: Guard
Medals
Representing United States
Men's basketball
Olympic Games
Gold medal – first place	1936 Berlin	Team competition

For other persons named John Gibbons see John Gibbons (disambiguation)

John Haskell "Tex" Gibbons (October 7, 1907 – May 30, 1984) was an American basketball player who competed in the 1936 Summer Olympics.

He was the captain of the 1936 Olympics American basketball team, which won the gold medal. He played one match.

He is also the father of Michael, Donald and educator William Gibbons.
