= John Gibbons (pitcher) =

American baseball player (1922–2008)

- Pitcher
- Born: April 16, 1922; Milan, Georgia, U.S.
- Died: June 16, 2008 (aged 86); Tampa, Florida, U.S.
- Batted: Right Threw: Right

Negro league baseball debut
- 1941, for the Philadelphia Stars

Last appearance
- 1941, for the New York Black Yankees
- Stats at Baseball Reference

Teams
- Philadelphia Stars (1941); New York Black Yankees (1941)

For other persons named John Gibbons see John Gibbons (disambiguation)

John Eddie Gibbons (April 16, 1922 – June 16, 2008) was an American Negro league baseball pitcher for the 1941 Philadelphia Stars and New York Black Yankees.

A native of Milan, Georgia, Gibbons was the brother of fellow negro leaguer Walter Lee Gibbons. Gibbons died in Tampa, Florida in 2008 at age 86.
