= John Anthony Nevin =

American psychologist (1933–2018)

John A. (Tony) Nevin
- Born: July 5, 1933; New York City, New York, U.S.
- Died: September 23, 2018 (aged 85); Dukes County, Massachusetts, U.S.
- Education: Yale University (BA); Columbia University (PhD)
- Known for: Behavioral momentum
- Scientific career
- Fields: Experimental Psychology, Quantitative Analysis of Behavior, Behavior analysis
- Workplaces: University of New Hampshire, Columbia University, Swarthmore College
- Doctoral advisor: William N. Schoenfeld

John Anthony Nevin (July 5, 1933 – September 23, 2018) was an American psychologist who was a professor of psychology at the University of New Hampshire.

== Biography ==
Nevin was born July 5, 1933, in New York City. In 1954, he obtained a B.E. in Mechanical Engineering from Yale University. From 1954-1959, he served in the US Coast Guard. He obtained an M.A. at Columbia University in 1961, and then a Ph.D. in Psychology in 1963; William N. Schoenfeld was his dissertation advisor. From 1963 to 1968, he was Assistant Professor of Psychology at Swarthmore College. In 1968, he was appointed Associate Professor of Psychology at Columbia University, and promoted to professor in 1970. He moved to the University of New Hampshire as Professor of Psychology in 1972, retiring in 1995. He remained active as professor emeritus for over 20 years, authoring and co-authoring many articles with colleagues from around the world. In 2015, he published a retrospective summary of his professional work, behavioral momentum.

== Research ==
He is known primarily for the development of Behavioral Momentum Theory following his 1974 article on resistance to change of pigeons' operant behavior. He received research support from the National Science Foundation and the National Institutes of Health throughout his career, most recently from the National Institute of Child Health and Human Development for application of momentum-based approaches to the treatment of severe problem behavior, conducted in collaboration with Drs. William Ahearn, Iser DeLeon, William Dube, F. C. Mace, Timothy Shahan, and more recently, Dr. Tara Sheehan (Journal of the Experimental Analysis of Behavior, 2016) of the Mailman Segall Center for Human Development at Nova Southeastern University. He has also worked with Dr. Michael Davison on application of signal-detection theory to the effects of reinforcement on conditional discrimination performance, culminating in a momentum-based theory of attending and remembering in conditional discrimination performance.

He was editor of the Journal of the Experimental Analysis of Behavior (JEAB) from 1980 to 1984, and was a cofounder of the Society for Quantitative Analysis of Behavior (SQAB).

== Honors ==
In addition to being named Distinguished University Professor, University of New Hampshire, 1991; he has received: Basic Research Award, Division 25, American Psychological Association, 1999; Award for Impact of Science on Application, Society for the Advancement of Behavior Analysis, 2004; Don Hake Basic/Applied research Award, Division 25, American Psychological Association, 2004; Victor G. Laties Award for Lifetime Service, Society for the Experimental Analysis of Behavior, 2014.
