= Edmund Fantino =

American experimental psychologist (1939–2015)

Edmund Fantino (June 30, 1939 – September 22, 2015) was an American experimental psychologist known for his contributions to the quantitative analysis of behavior. Raised in Queens, New York, he earned a bachelor's degree in mathematics from Cornell University in 1961 and a Ph.D. in experimental psychology from Harvard University in 1964, under the guidance of Richard Herrnstein.

Fantino held a professorship at the University of California, San Diego, where he achieved the distinction of Distinguished Professor of Psychology and affiliation with the Neurosciences Group. He served as president of the Association for Behavior Analysis International and edited the Journal of the Experimental Analysis of Behavior. The Society for the Advancement of Behavior Analysis recognized him with the Distinguished Service to Behavior Analysis Award, and he received multiple distinguished teaching awards from UCSD.

Fantino's prolific career produced numerous articles on a range of topics within behavioral science, including learning and motivation, self-control, and choice behavior. His most notable work, however, is likely the Delay Reduction Theory, which he first introduced in the Journal of the Experimental Analysis of Behavior in 1969.
