= Crime and Human Nature =

1985 book

- Cover of the first edition
- Authors: James Q. Wilson, Richard Herrnstein
- Language: English
- Subject: Crime
- Publisher: Simon & Schuster
- Publication date: 1985
- Publication place: United States
- Media type: Print
- Pages: 639
- ISBN: 0671628100

Crime and Human Nature: The Definitive Study of the Causes of Crime is a 1985 book about the causes of crime by the political scientist James Q. Wilson and the psychologist Richard Herrnstein.

== Summary ==
Wilson and Herrnstein present and critique almost all major theories of the etiology of crime, with the notable exception of critical theory. The book is especially critical of mainstream sociological theories of crime. They also argue that crime primarily results from intrinsic aspects of human nature, rather than from psychological or environmental factors, and that biology and genetics play an important role in the causation of crime.

== Reception ==
Writing in The New York Times, the social scientist John Kaplan wrote in his review of Crime and Human Nature that "there is no doubt that this is an important book and will be the starting place for discussions of the subject for years to come." In a more mixed review of the book, Susan Jaco wrote that "The authors' point of view is buried amid so many tedious studies – many of which could just as easily be summed up in aphorisms like "the apple doesn't fall far from the tree" – that it is difficult to discern their real opinions on the causes and prevention of crime." Nevertheless, she concluded that the book "...will be useful to anyone who wishes to have access, in one volume, to most of the important criminological studies of the past 50 years."

== Impact ==
Crime and Human Nature was called "the most important book on crime to appear in a decade" by the law professor John Monahan in 1986. Also in 1986, Michael Nietzel and Richard Milich wrote of the book that "Seldom does a book written by two academicians generate the interest and spark the debate that this one has," noting that by February 1986, it had been reviewed by at least 20 publications. The book was particularly controversial because it re-invigorated the nature versus nurture debate in criminology. The book also influenced Herbert Needleman to research the potential link between lead and crime. In 2012, The Washington Post's Matt Schudel wrote that the book was "one of [Wilson's] most controversial books".
