= Sussex International Piano Competition =

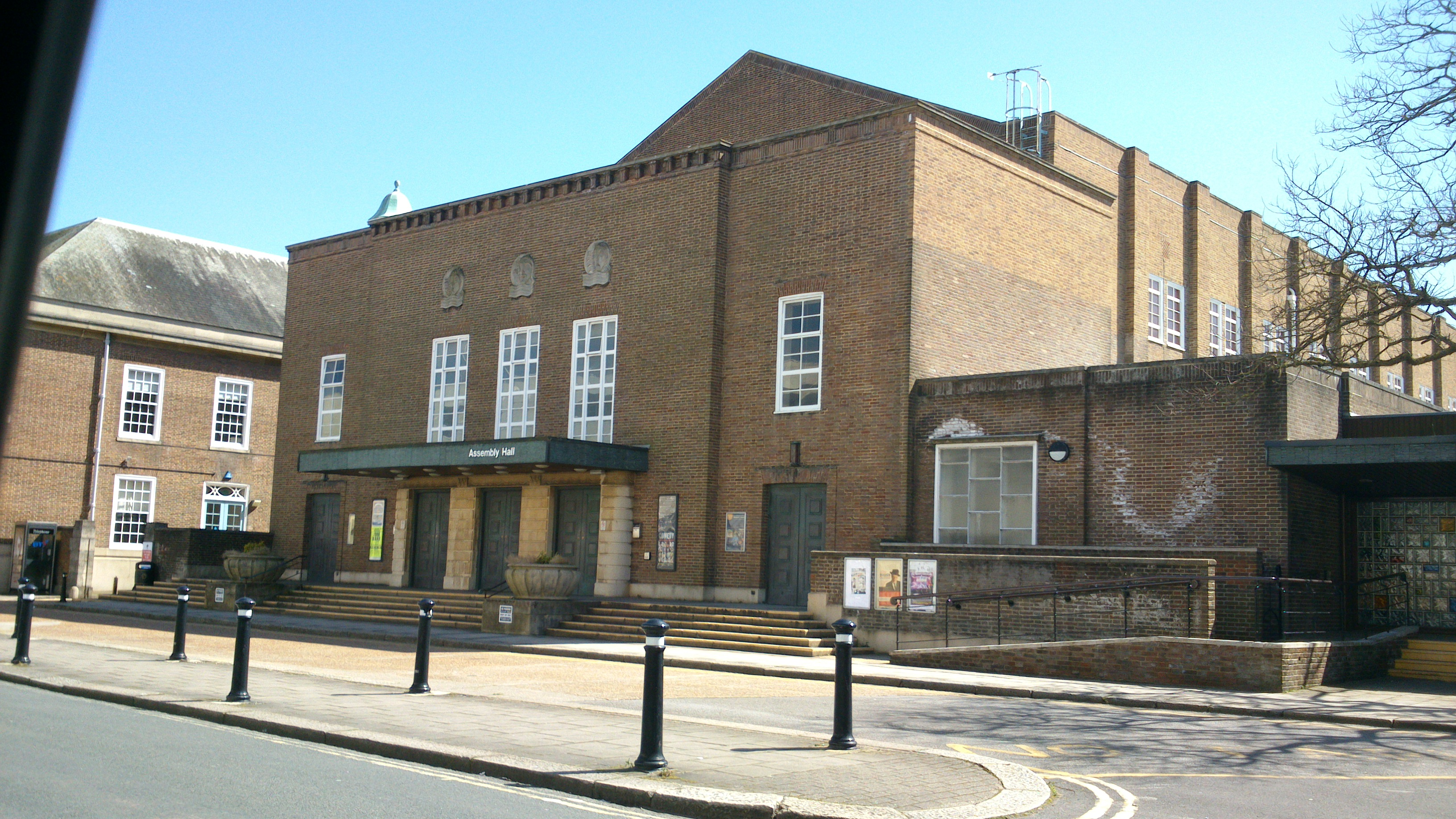
- The Assembly Hall, Worthing in 2013 - competition venue
- Awarded for: Exceptional piano performance
- Country: United Kingdom
- First award: 2010
- Final award: 2018
- Website: www.sussexipc.co.uk/

The Sussex International Piano Competition is a music competition that takes place in Worthing, West Sussex, England. It was founded in 2010 by Worthing Symphony Orchestra (WSO) artistic director and conductor John Gibbons. It takes place at the Assembly Hall in Worthing, a venue noted for its acoustics, which, according to the organisers, are some of the best in Europe.

The competitors are accompanied by the Worthing Symphony Orchestra. The second edition of the competition was won by Poom Prommachart of Thailand, who in the Grand Final played Rachmaninoff’s 3rd piano concerto. The third edition of the competition was won by Varvara Tarasova of Russia who played Chopin's second piano concerto. Yi-Yang Chen won the fourth edition of the competition having played Beethoven's Symphony No. 4 in the Grand Final.

The international jury for the second edition of the competition was drawn from across the music industry and included composer/pianist John McCabe (President of the British Music Society), Philip Fowke (UK), Yuki Negishi (Japan), Judith Clark (Brighton Philharmonic Orchestra) and the competition’s 2010 inaugural winner Arta Arnicane (Latvia). Patrons of the event include Karl Jenkins, Rick Wakeman, and BBC presenters Katie Derham, Ken Bruce, John Inverdale and Eleanor Oldroyd.

The jury for the third competition in 2015 included İdil Biret from Turkey and winner of the second Sussex International Piano Competition, Poom Prommachart. The jury for the competition's fourth edition included previous winners Arta Arnicane (2010) and Varvara Tarasova (2015).

== Prize Winners ==
Year	1st	2nd	3rd	Audience Prize
2010	(Latvia) Arta Arnicane	(Russia) Alexey Chernov	(United States) Jessica Zhu	(United States) Jessica Zhu
2013	(Thailand) Poom Prommachart	(Kazakhstan) Rabiga Dyussembayeva	(Ukraine) Olga Paliy	(Ukraine) Olga Paliy
2015	(Russia) Varvara Tarasova	(Ukraine) Dinara Klinton	(Poland) Anna Szałucka	(Russia) Varvara Tarasova
2018	(Taiwan) Yi-Yang Chen	(Russia) Sofya Bugayan	(Hong Kong) Rhythmie Wong	(Taiwan) Yi-Yang Chen
