= Unnatural Selection: Why the Geeks Will Inherit the Earth =

Book by Mark Roeder

Unnatural Selection: Why The Geeks Will Inherit The Earth
- First edition (Australia)
- Author: Mark Roeder
- Language: English
- Published: 2013, ABC Books
- Publication place: United States
- Media type: Print (Hardback)
- Pages: 300
- ISBN: 978-1-62872-435-6 (first edition)
- OCLC: 55586972
- Dewey Decimal: 302 22
- LC Class: HM1043 .G63 4102

Unnatural Selection: Why The Geeks Will Inherit The Earth is a book by Mark Roeder, first published by ABC Books in 2013.

== Overview ==
The book analyses the impact of technology on human evolution and the rise of the geek class. It suggests that the Man-made environment of the Anthropocene is selecting for more diverse traits in humans, compared to previous generations, which is fostering a cognitive revolution in the human species.

Roeder suggests that geeks often have behavioral or genetic traits that were previously considered detrimental, such as ADHD or autism spectrum disorders. But the new high-tech environment has created a kind of digital greenhouse that favors these traits in certain circumstances, enabling many people to bloom. They resonate with the technological zeitgeist in a way that turns their weakness into strengths.

The book examines various categories of geeks, and attempts to explain why they have become so successful in fields such as technology, finance, military, politics, and entertainment.

Roeder suggests that the rise of the geek class will be further accelerated by advances in the fields of pharmacology, genetic engineering, and artificial intelligence, which will ‘eventually enable many more people to have geek-like powers, fostering a cognitive arms race’. ‘For the first time in human history,’ Roeder wrote, ‘humans will have the capacity to chart their own evolution - as the process of Darwinian natural selection is superseded by unnatural selection.’ He warns that 'human enhancement technologies will eventually threaten our sense of identity as human beings.'

== Reception ==
Steve Silberman, an editor of Wired magazine, wrote that Unnatural Selection ‘is a provocative book that explains why (geeks) have become a social force driving a new kind of human evolution.’ Author Daniel Wilson suggested that the book ‘paints a compelling picture of human adaptability, identifying new traits within all of us that are helping us to survive and succeed in a world dominated by information. This is not just wishful thinking for geeks — technology is changing the landscape of society, and Roeder describes how humanity is changing along with it.’

Unnatural Selection was criticized by Canadian reviewer Jenny Henkelman, for its emphasis on ‘male geeks’, which implies that ‘we might find that the new digital world isn’t much different to the old one. A world in which the primary actors continue to be Steves, Julians and Jeffs’ (i.e. white males). Nicola Gaston, writing in the New Zealand Association of Scientists Review, said, ‘The case that Roeder is making is rather logical up to a point…but it is the author’s insistence on ‘geekiness’ as an essential quality, which is now being selected for, that I lost some sympathy for.’

== See also ==
- Geek
- Evolution
- Darwin
- Technological Singularity
- Artificial Intelligence
