= Rate (mathematics) =

Ratio between two related quantities in different units

In mathematics, a rate is the quotient of two quantities, often represented as a fraction. If the divisor (or fraction denominator) in the rate is equal to one expressed as a single unit, and if it is assumed that this quantity can be changed systematically (i.e., is an independent variable), then the dividend (the fraction numerator) of the rate expresses the corresponding rate of change in the other (dependent) variable. In some cases, it may be regarded as a change to a value, which is caused by a change of a value in respect to another value. For example, acceleration is a change in velocity with respect to time.

Temporal rate is a common type of rate, in which the denominator is a time duration ("per unit of time"), such as in speed, heart rate, and flux. In fact, often rate is a synonym of rhythm or frequency, a count per second (i.e., hertz); e.g., radio frequencies or sample rates. In describing the units of a rate, the word "per" is used to separate the units of the two measurements used to calculate the rate; for example, a heart rate is expressed as "beats per minute".

Rates that have a non-time divisor or denominator include exchange rates, literacy rates, and electric field (in volts per meter).

A rate defined using two numbers of the same units will result in a dimensionless quantity, also known as ratio or simply as a rate (such as tax rates) or counts (such as literacy rate). Dimensionless rates can be expressed as a percentage (for example, the global literacy rate in 1998 was 80%), fraction, or multiple.

== Properties and examples ==
Rates and ratios often vary with time, location, particular element (or subset) of a set of objects, etc. Thus they are often mathematical functions.

A rate (or ratio) may often be thought of as an output-input ratio, benefit-cost ratio, all considered in the broad sense. For example, miles per hour in transportation is the output (or benefit) in terms of miles of travel, which one gets from spending an hour (a cost in time) of traveling (at this velocity).

A set of sequential indices may be used to enumerate elements (or subsets) of a set of ratios under study. For example, in finance, one could define i by assigning consecutive integers to companies, to political subdivisions (such as states), to different investments, etc. The reason for using indices i is so a set of ratios (i = 0, N) can be used in an equation to calculate a function of the rates such as an average of a set of ratios. For example, the average velocity found from the set of v_{i}'s mentioned above. Finding averages may involve using weighted averages and possibly using the harmonic mean.

A ratio r = a/b has both a numerator a and a denominator b. The value of a and b may be a real number or integer. The inverse of a ratio r is 1/r = b/a. A rate may be equivalently expressed as an inverse of its value if the ratio of its units is also inverse. For example, 5 miles (mi) per kilowatt-hour (kWh) corresponds to 1/5 kWh/mi (or 200 Wh/mi).

Rates are relevant to many aspects of everyday life. For example: How fast are you driving? The speed of the car (often expressed in miles per hour) is a rate. What interest does your savings account pay you? The amount of interest paid per year is a rate.

== Rate of change ==
Consider the case where the numerator $f$ of a rate is a function $f(a)$ where $a$ happens to be the denominator of the rate $\delta f/\delta a$. A rate of change of $f$ with respect to $a$ (where $a$ is incremented by $h$) can be formally defined in two ways:

$$\begin{align}
\mbox{Average rate of change} &= \frac{f(x + h) - f(x)}{h}\\
\mbox{Instantaneous rate of change} &= \lim_{h \to 0}\frac{f(x + h) - f(x)}{h}
\end{align}$$

where f(x) is the function with respect to x over the interval from a to a+h. An instantaneous rate of change is equivalent to a derivative.

For example, the average speed of a car can be calculated using the total distance traveled between two points, divided by the travel time. In contrast, the instantaneous velocity can be determined by viewing a speedometer.

== List of temporal rates ==
In chemistry and physics:

- Speed, the rate of change of position, or the change of position per unit of time
- Acceleration, the rate of change in speed, or the change in speed per unit of time
- Power, the rate of doing work, or the amount of energy transferred per unit time
- Frequency, the number of occurrences of a repeating event per unit of time
  - Angular frequency and rotation speed, the number of turns per unit of time
- Reaction rate, the speed at which chemical reactions occur
- Volumetric flow rate, the volume of fluid which passes through a given surface per unit of time; e.g., cubic meters per second

=== Counts-per-time rates ===
- Radioactive decay, the amount of radioactive material in which one nucleus decays per second, measured in becquerels

In computing:

- Bit rate, the number of bits that are conveyed or processed by a computer per unit of time
- Symbol rate, the number of symbol changes (signaling events) made to the transmission medium per second
- Sampling rate, the number of samples (signal measurements) per second

Miscellaneous definitions:

- Rate of reinforcement, number of reinforcements per unit of time, usually per minute
- Heart rate, usually measured in beats per minute

== Economics/finance rates/ratios ==
- Exchange rate, how much one currency is worth in terms of the other
- Inflation rate, the ratio of the change in the general price level during a year to the starting price level
- Interest rate, the price a borrower pays for the use of the money they do not own (ratio of payment to amount borrowed)
- Price–earnings ratio, market price per share of stock divided by annual earnings per share
- Rate of return, the ratio of money gained or lost on an investment relative to the amount of money invested
- Tax rate, the tax amount divided by the taxable income
- Unemployment rate, the ratio of the number of people who are unemployed to the number in the labor force
- Wage rate, the amount paid for working a given amount of time (or doing a standard amount of accomplished work) (ratio of payment to time)

== Other rates ==
- Birth rate, and mortality rate, the number of births or deaths scaled to the size of that population, per unit of time
- Literacy rate, the proportion of the population over age fifteen that can read and write
- Sex ratio or gender ratio, the ratio of males to females in a population

== See also ==
- Derivative
- Gradient
- Hertz
- Slope
