= John Gibbon (cricketer) =

English cricketer and clergyman

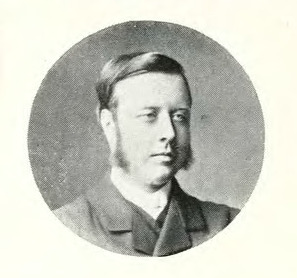

Personal information
- Full name: John Houghton Gibbon
- Born: 21 August 1847; Gateacre, Lancashire, England
- Died: 29 April 1883 (aged 35); Willersey, Gloucestershire, England
- Batting: Right-handed

Domestic team information
- Years: Team
- 1868–1869: Oxford University

Career statistics
Competition	First-class
Matches	4
Runs scored	31
Batting average	5.16
100s/50s	–/–
Top score	17
Catches/stumpings	2/–
- Source: Cricinfo, 23 March 2020

John Houghton Gibbon (21 August 1847 – 29 April 1883) was an English clergyman and first-class cricketer.

The son of Edward Gibbon, he was born in the affluent Liverpool suburb of Gateacre in August 1847. He was educated at Harrow School, matriculating at Brasenose College, Oxford in 1866, and graduating B.A. in 1871, M.A. in 1873. While studying at Oxford, he played first-class cricket for Oxford University on four occasions, with one appearance in 1868 and three appearances in 1869, including in that seasons University Match at Lord's. He scored a total of 31 runs in his four matches, with a high score of 17.

After graduating from Oxford, he took holy orders in the Church of England. His first ecclesiastical post was as rector of Willersey in Gloucestershire in 1873, a post he held until his death there in April 1883. His grandson was the British Army general Sir John Gibbon.
