= Mark Roeder =

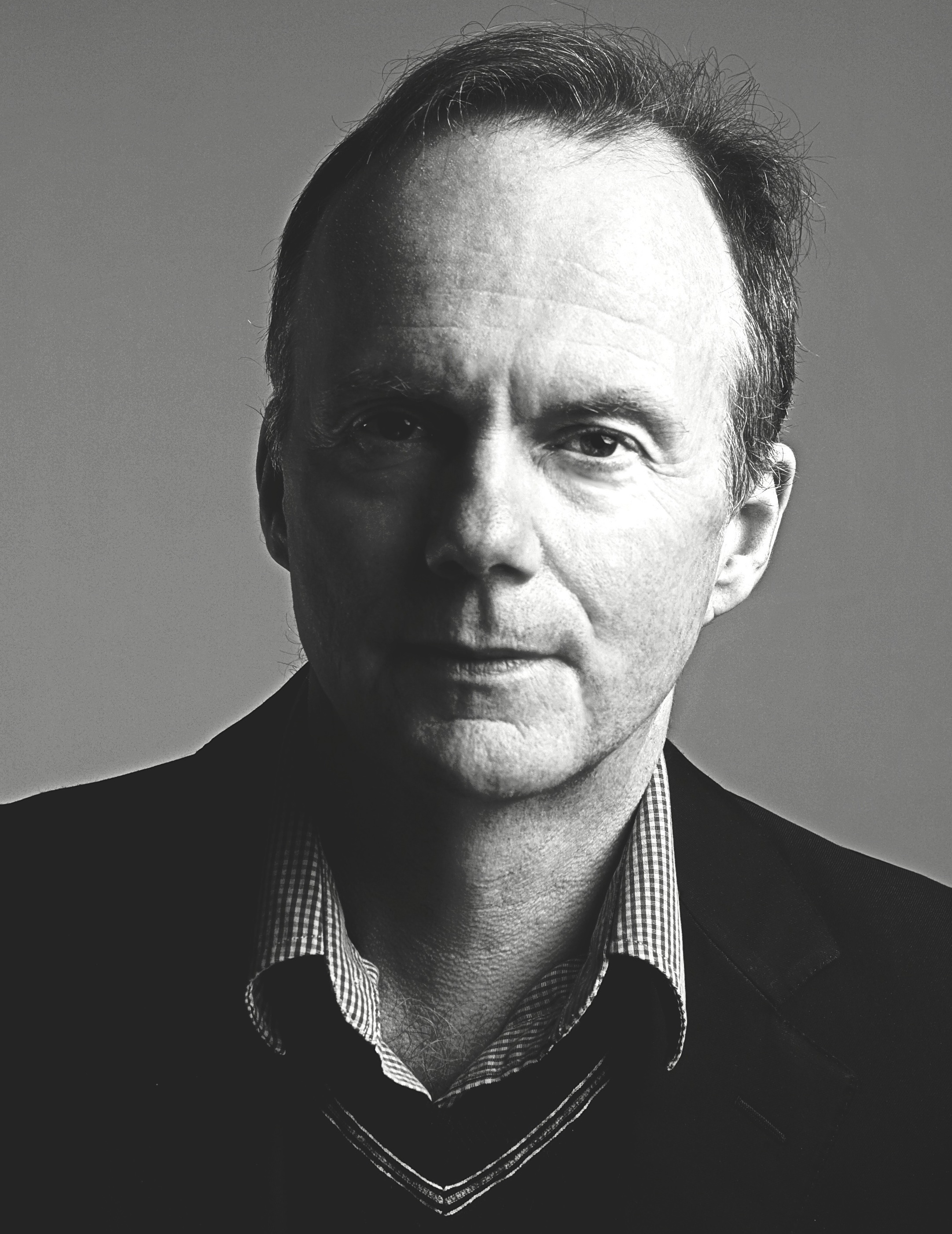
- Born: Mark Lewis Mendick Roeder; 1957 (age 68–69); London, England
- Education: University of NSW
- Occupation: Author

Mark Lewis Mendick Roeder (born 28 May 1957) is an Australian-British author and cultural commentator. He has written The Big Mo (book): Why Momentum Rules The World (2011), and Unnatural Selection: Why The Geeks Will Inherit The Earth (2013). Roeder's books and articles explore social phenomena and the impact of technology on human behaviour.

== Background and education ==
Roeder was born in London, England. His father, Reuben Mendick, was a medical doctor and dux of George Heriot's School in Edinburgh, Scotland. Roeder's maternal great, great-grandfather is the author Frank Fowler, who played a significant role in Australia's early literary history. Roeder holds a master's degree in Business and Technology (MBT) from the University of NSW.

== Career ==
Before becoming a writer, Roeder worked as a corporate executive, and held senior roles at UBS Banking Group, Zurich Insurance Group and Westpac and lived in London, New York, Sydney and Zurich. He currently works as a consultant with David Hale (economist) Global Economics, and is a Delphi Fellow contributor to Big Think.

== Works ==
Roeder's book, The Big Mo (2011), explores the role that large-scale momentum played in the 2008 financial crisis. It was described by the Financial Times as 'A compelling book that journeys seamlessly from finances to the Iraq war, from oil prices and climate change to religion and pop culture in an effort to explain how we behave and why we are so easily led.' Roeder explained that,

Recent technological advances, such as computer-driven trading programs, together with the increasingly interconnected nature of markets, have magnified the momentum effect. This effect is not limited to the financial markets. It can be felt across other aspects of society, particularly in politics, business, technology and the media where Big Mo, now operates on a massive scale.

The ABC broadcaster and critic Phillip Adams described The Big Mo as 'a revelation. In our personal, political and economic lives we seem to be swept along by circumstances. Our attempts to change direction are doomed. The Big Mo explains why.' The Guardian 's Steven Poole, criticised the book for 'overstretching the Newtonian-physics analogy'. Roeder's book, Unnatural Selection: Why the Geeks will Inherit the Earth (2013), analyses the impact of technology on human evolution and the rise of the ‘geek’ class. It suggests that the Man-made environment of the Anthropocene is selecting for more diverse traits in humans, compared to previous generations, which is fostering a cognitive revolution in the human species.

== Bibliography ==
- What We Do Next Really Matters. (2022). Australian Scholarly Publishing & Arden International. ISBN 978-1-922-66920-9
- Unnatural Selection: Why the Geeks Will Inherit the Earth. (2013). HarperCollins. ISBN 9780733328367, (2014) Arcade Publishing (USA & Europe) ISBN 1628724358
- The Big Mo: Why Momentum Rules the World. (2011). HarperCollins (Australasia) ISBN 9780733328367, Random House (Europe and Global) ISBN 0753539373, Xinhua Publishing House (China). ISBN 9780730494485
- "What’s Next (The Diminishing Returns of the Information Age – section)" (2012). David & Lyric Hale. Yale University Press. ISBN 0300170319,
- Space Invaders. Co-authored as Mark Mendick with Julian Wolanski. Consolidated Press. ISBN 0855668229
