= Rate of response =

Concept in behaviourism

In behaviorism, rate of response is a ratio between two measurements with different units. Rate of responding is the number of responses per minute, or some other time unit. It is usually written as R. Its first major exponent was B.F. Skinner (1939). It is used in the matching law.

R = # of Responses/Unit of time = B/t

== See also ==
- Rate of reinforcement
