= Worthing Symphony Orchestra =

- The professional orchestra of Sussex
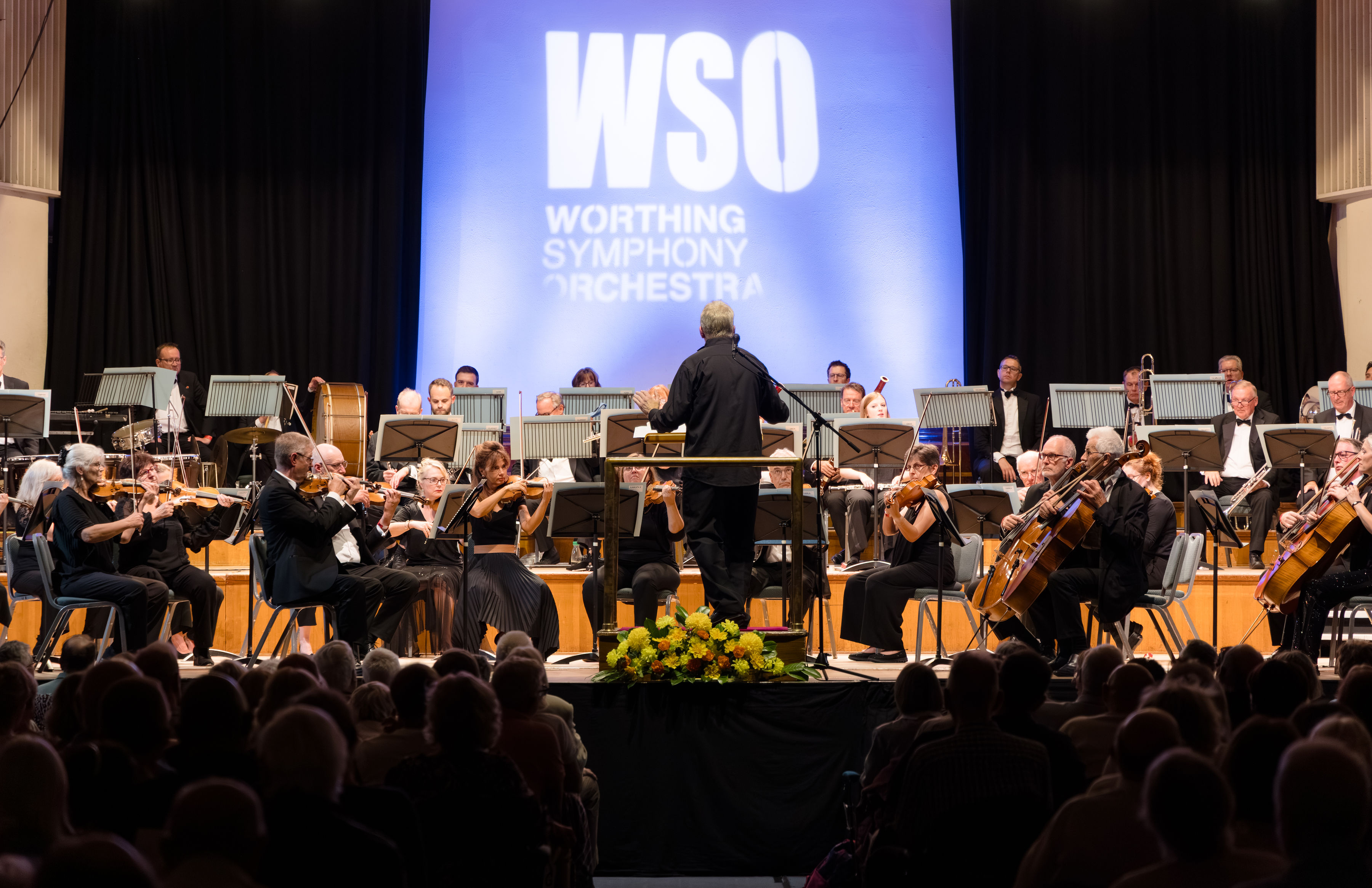
- Short name: WSO
- Founded: 1926
- Concert hall: Assembly Hall, Worthing
- Principal conductor: John Gibbons
- Concertmaster: Julian Leaper
- Website: www.worthingsymphony.org.uk

The Worthing Symphony Orchestra is the professional orchestra of Sussex and the only professional orchestra in the English county of West Sussex. Founded in 1926, the orchestra was the first municipal orchestra in Great Britain.

WSO's principal conductor John Gibbons, has led the ensemble since 1997. The orchestra is led by Julian Leaper, who also leads the City of London Sinfonia. As of 2025, the orchestra has around 55-60 musicians.

The orchestra performs its main symphonic season at the Assembly Hall in Worthing, which, according to the WSO's principal conductor, John Gibbons, boasts some of the finest acoustics in Europe. Notable musicians who have performed with the WSO at the Assembly Hall include Julian Lloyd Webber, and Nicola Benedetti.

The WSO also accompanies competitors in the Sussex International Piano Competition.

== See also ==
- Music of Sussex
