= Delay reduction hypothesis =

Psychology concept

In operant conditioning, the delay reduction hypothesis (DRH; also known as delay reduction theory) is a quantitative description of how choice among concurrently available chained schedules of reinforcement is allocated. The hypothesis states that the greater improvement in temporal proximity to reinforcement (delay reduction) correlated with the onset of a stimulus, the more effectively that stimulus will function as a conditional reinforcer.

The hypothesis was originally formulated to describe choice behaviour among concurrently available chained schedules of reinforcement; however, the basic principle of delay reduction $(T - t_x)$ as the basis for determining a stimulus’ conditionally reinforcing function can be applied more generally to other research areas.

A variety of empirical data corroborate and are consistent with DRH and it represents one of the most substantiated accounts of conditional reinforcement to date.

== Application to Concurrent Chain Schedules ==
Given two concurrently available chained schedules of reinforcement, $R_a$ and $R_b$ represent the number of responses made during alternative A and B’s initial link stimulus.

$t_a$ and $t_b$ represent the average duration of each choice’s respective terminal link. $T$ is the average duration to terminal reinforcement from the onset of either initial link stimulus.

$$\begin{align}
\frac{R_a}{R_a + R_b} &= \frac{(T-t_a)}{(T-t_a) + (T-t_b)} \text{, when } t_a < T, t_b < T \\
&= 1 \text{, when } t_a < T, t_b > T \\
&= 0 \text{, when } t_a > T, t_b < T
\end{align}$$

The expression $T - t_x$ represents the delay reduction on a given alternative.

== Extensions to the Original Model ==
=== Squires and Fantino (1971) ===
The original formulation by Fantino predicted that choices with equivalent terminal link durations would produce equal allocation of responding (e.g., 0.5 across two choices) regardless the duration of the initial links. Squires and Fantino (1971) proposed including the rate of terminal reinforcement on each choice alternative.

$$\begin{align}
\frac{R_a}{R_a + R_b} &= \frac{r_a(T-t_a)}{r_a(T-t_a) + r_b(T-t_b)} \text{, when } t_a < T, t_b < T \\
&= 1 \text{, when } t_a < T, t_b > T \\
&= 0 \text{, when } t_a > T, t_b < T
\end{align}$$

The rate of terminal reinforcement is $r_x = {n_x}{i_x + n_x t_x}$ where $i_x$ is the average duration of an initial link and $n_x$ is the number of terminal reinforcements obtained during a single entry to a terminal link. A critical prediction of this formulation is that matching is obtained when the terminal links are equal durations.

== See also ==
- Classical conditioning
