= Russell Church =

American psychologist (1930–2021)

Russell M. Church
- Born: December 24, 1930
- Died: May 24, 2021 (aged 90)

Academic background
- Education: University of Michigan; Harvard University

Academic work
- Institutions: Brown University

Russell M. Church (December 24, 1930 – May 24, 2021) was an American psychologist, who was the Edgar L. Marston professor of psychology at Brown University, having formerly served as the Charles Pitts Robinson and John Palmer Barstow Professor from 1993 to 1999.

Church received his A.B. from the University of Michigan in 1952 and his A.M. and Ph.D. from Harvard University in 1954 and 1956.
