= Scalar expectancy =

Model of processes governing behavior controlled by time

The scalar timing or scalar expectancy theory (SET) is a model of the processes that govern behavior controlled by time. The model posits an internal clock, and particular memory and decision processes. SET is one of the most important models of animal timing behavior.

== History ==
John Gibbon originally proposed SET to explain the temporally controlled behavior of non-human subjects. He initially used the model to account for a pattern of behavior seen in animals that are being reinforced at fixed-intervals, for example every 2 minutes. An animal that is well trained on such a fixed-interval schedule pauses after each reinforcement and then suddenly starts responding about two-thirds of the way through the new interval. (See operant conditioning) The model explains how the animal's behavior is controlled by time in this manner. Gibbon and others later elaborated the model and applied it to a variety of other timing phenomena.

== Summary of the model ==
SET assumes that the animal has a clock, a working memory, a reference memory, and a decision process. The clock contains a discrete pacemaker that generates pulses like the ticks a mechanical clock. A stimulus that signals the start of a timed interval closes a switch, allowing pulses to enter an accumulator. The resulting accumulation of pulses represents elapsed time, and this time value is continuously sent to a working memory. When reinforcement happens at the end of the timed interval, the time value is stored in a long-term reference memory. This time-to-reinforcement in reference memory represents the expected time to reinforcement.

Key to the SET model is the decision process that controls timing behavior. While the animal is timing some interval it continually compares the current time (stored in working memory) to the expected time (stored in reference memory). Specifically, the animal continually samples from its memory of past times at which reinforcement occurred and compares this memory sample with the current time on its clock. When the two values are close to one another the animal responds; when they are far enough apart, the animal stops responding. To make this comparison, it computes the ratio of the two values; when the ratio is less than a certain value it responds, when the ratio is larger it does not respond.

By using a ratio of current time to expected time, rather than, for example, simply subtracting one from the other, SET accounts for a key observation about animal and human timing. That is, timing precision is relative to the size of the interval being timed (See Accuracy and precision). This is the "scalar" property that gives the model its name. For example, when timing a 10 sec interval an animal might be precise to within 1 sec, whereas when timing a 100 sec interval the animal would be precise to only about 10 sec. Thus time perception is like the perception of lights, sounds, and other sensory events, where precision is also relative to the size (brightness, loudness, etc.) of the percept being judged. (See Weber-Fechner law.)

A number of alternative models of timing have appeared over the years. These include Killeen’s Behavioral Theory of timing (BeT) model and Machado’s learning-to-time (LeT) model.

Moreover, there are some evidence that this property might not be valid in all ranges of durations. Additionally John Staddon argues that SET is inconsistent on explaining the location of temporal indifference point in temporal bisection procedure.

== Human mechanism ==
In 1993, John Wearden claimed that human behavior exhibits appropriate scalar properties, as was indicated by experiments on internal production with concurrent chronometric counting. However, human timing behavior is undoubtedly more varied than animal timing behavior. A major factor responsible for this variability is attentional allocation.
