= Rate of reinforcement =

In behaviorism, rate of reinforcement is number of reinforcements per time, usually per minute. Symbol of this rate is usually Rf. Its first major exponent was B.F. Skinner (1939). It is used in the matching law.

Rf = # of reinforcements/unit of time = S^{R+}/t

== See also ==
- Rate of response
