= Presidency of George H. W. Bush =

1989–1993 U.S. presidential administration

- Official portrait, 1989
- Presidency of George H. W. Bush; January 20, 1989 – January 20, 1993
- Vice President: Dan Quayle
- Cabinet: See list
- Party: Republican
- Election: 1988
- Seat: White House
- Seal of the President

George H. W. Bush's tenure as the 41st president of the United States began with his inauguration on January 20, 1989, and ended on January 20, 1993. Bush, a Republican from Texas and the incumbent vice president for two terms under President Ronald Reagan, took office after defeating the Democratic nominee Michael Dukakis in the 1988 presidential election. His presidency ended following his re-election defeat to the Democratic nominee Bill Clinton in the 1992 presidential election. Bush was the father of the 43rd president, George W. Bush.

International affairs dominated the Bush presidency, which navigated the end of the Cold War and a new era of U.S.–Soviet relations. After the fall of the Berlin Wall, Bush successfully pushed for the reunification of Germany in close cooperation with West German chancellor Helmut Kohl, overcoming the reluctance of Soviet leader Mikhail Gorbachev. He also led an international coalition of countries which invaded and defeated Iraq after it invaded Kuwait in the Gulf War. On a smaller scale he directed a military invasion to overthrow a dictator in Panama. Bush signed the North American Free Trade Agreement, which created a trilateral trade bloc consisting of the United States, Canada, and Mexico.

In domestic affairs, Bush faced a large federal budget deficit. Despite pledging he would not raise taxes, Bush agreed to a budget with the Democratic-controlled Congress that raised taxes and cut spending. He received bipartisan criticism for the perceived "flip-flop" on the issue of taxation during his 1992 campaign. Bush nominated David Souter and Clarence Thomas to the Supreme Court in 1990 and 1991, respectively. During his tenure, he signed into law the Financial Institutions Reform, Recovery, and Enforcement Act of 1989, the Oil Pollution Act of 1990, the Americans with Disabilities Act of 1990, and the Civil Rights Act of 1991.

In the aftermath of allied victory in the Gulf War, Bush was widely considered likely to win re-election, but Clinton defeated Bush with Ross Perot, the third-party candidate, taking a large chunk of the electorate. Despite his defeat, Bush left office with a 56 percent job approval rating, and he remained popular with the public until his death in 2018. In polls of historians and political scientists, Bush is generally ranked as an average to above-average president.

== 1988 election ==
1988 Electoral College vote results

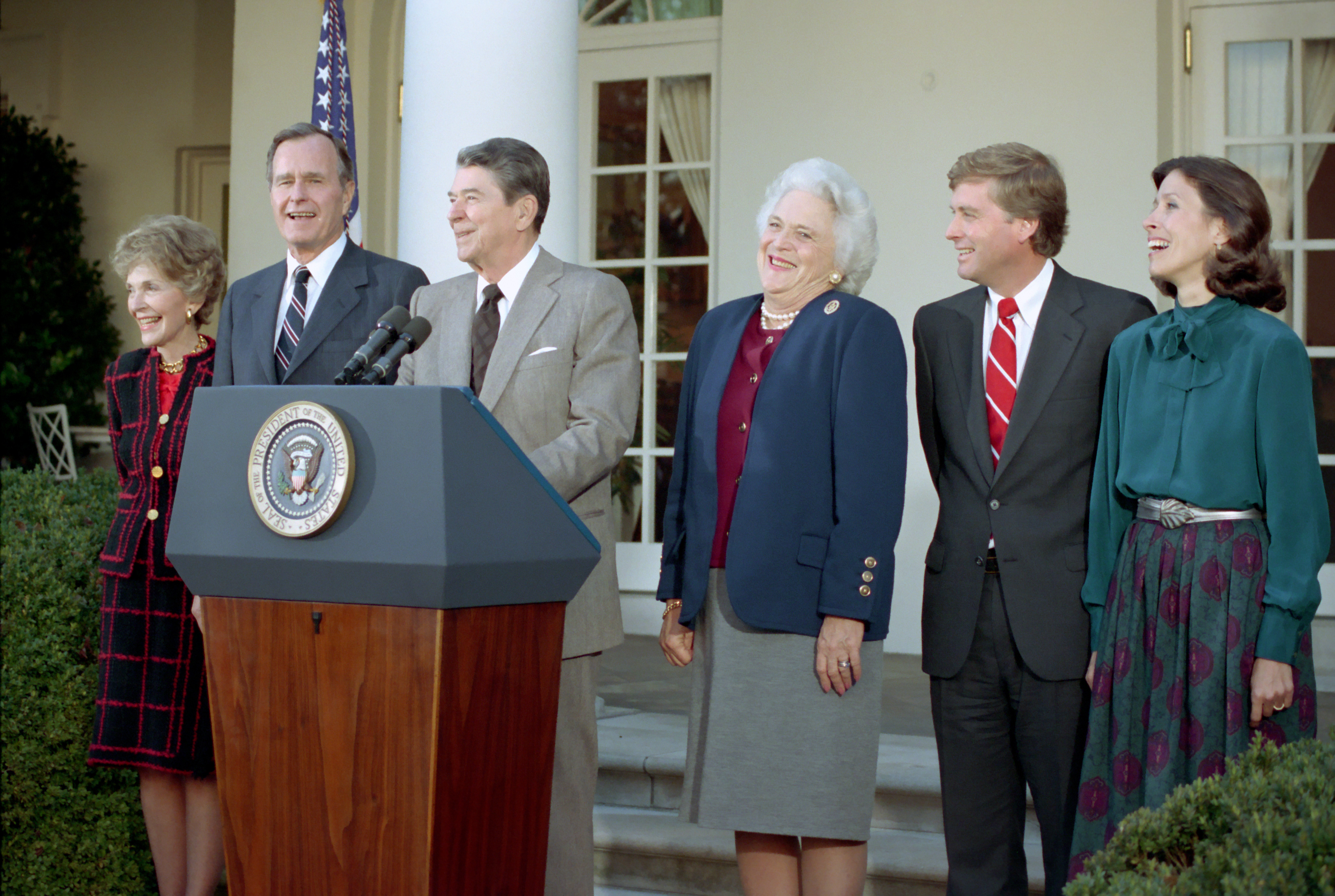
Outgoing president Ronald Reagan with his wife Nancy, Vice President and President-elect George H. W. Bush with his wife Barbara, and Vice President-elect Dan Quayle with his wife Marilyn in the White House Rose Garden on November 9, 1988

Having served in various government positions, particularly the position of Director of the CIA, Bush sought the presidential nomination in the 1980 Republican primaries. He was defeated by Ronald Reagan, a conservative former governor from California. Seeking to balance the ticket with an ideological moderate, Reagan selected Bush as his running mate. Reagan triumphed over incumbent Democratic president Jimmy Carter in the 1980 presidential election, and Bush took office as vice president in 1981. Bush enjoyed warm relations with Reagan, and the vice president served as an important adviser and made numerous public appearances on behalf of the Reagan administration.

Bush entered the 1988 Republican presidential primaries in October 1987. He promised to provide "steady, experienced leadership", and Reagan privately supported his candidacy. Bush's major rivals for the Republican nomination were Senate minority leader Bob Dole of Kansas, Congressman Jack Kemp of New York, and Christian televangelist Pat Robertson. Though considered the early front-runner for the nomination, Bush came in third in the Iowa caucus, behind Dole and Robertson. Due in part to a financial advantage over Dole, Bush rebounded with a victory in the New Hampshire primary, then won South Carolina and 16 of the 17 states holding a primary on Super Tuesday. Bush's competitors dropped out of the race soon after Super Tuesday.

Bush, occasionally criticized for his lack of eloquence when compared to Reagan, delivered a well-received speech at the 1988 Republican National Convention. Known as the "thousand points of light" speech, it described Bush's vision of America: he endorsed the Pledge of Allegiance, prayer in schools, capital punishment, and gun rights. Bush also pledged that he would not raise taxes, stating: "Congress will push me to raise taxes, and I'll say no, and they'll push, and I'll say no, and they'll push again. And all I can say to them is: read my lips. No new taxes." Bush selected little-known senator Dan Quayle of Indiana as his running mate. Though Quayle had compiled an unremarkable record in Congress, he was popular among many conservatives, and the campaign hoped that Quayle's youth would appeal to younger voters.

While Bush won a swift victory in the Republican primaries, many in the press referred to the Democratic presidential candidates as the "Seven Dwarfs" due to a lack of notable party leaders in the field. Senator Ted Kennedy and Governor Mario Cuomo both declined to enter the race, while the campaigns of former senator Gary Hart and Senator Joe Biden both ended in controversy. Ultimately, Governor Michael Dukakis, known for presiding over an economic turnaround in Massachusetts, emerged as the Democratic presidential nominee, defeating Jesse Jackson, Al Gore, and several other candidates. Leading in the polls, Dukakis launched a low-risk campaign that proved ineffective. Under the direction of strategist Lee Atwater, the Bush campaign attacked Dukakis as an unpatriotic liberal extremist. The campaign seized on Willie Horton, a convicted felon from Massachusetts who had raped a woman while on a prison furlough; the Bush campaign charged that Dukakis presided over a "revolving door" that allowed dangerous convicted felons to leave prison. Dukakis damaged his own campaign with a widely mocked ride in an M1 Abrams tank and a poor performance at the second presidential debate.

Bush defeated Dukakis by a margin of 426 to 111 in the Electoral College, and he took 53.37 percent of the national popular vote. Bush ran well in all the major regions of the country, but especially in the South. He became the first sitting vice president to be elected president since Martin Van Buren in 1836, as well as the first person to succeed a president from his own party via election since Herbert Hoover in 1929. (Note: The 1988 presidential election remains the only presidential election since 1948 in which either party won a third consecutive term.) In the concurrent congressional elections, Democrats retained control of the House of Representatives and the Senate.

== Inauguration ==
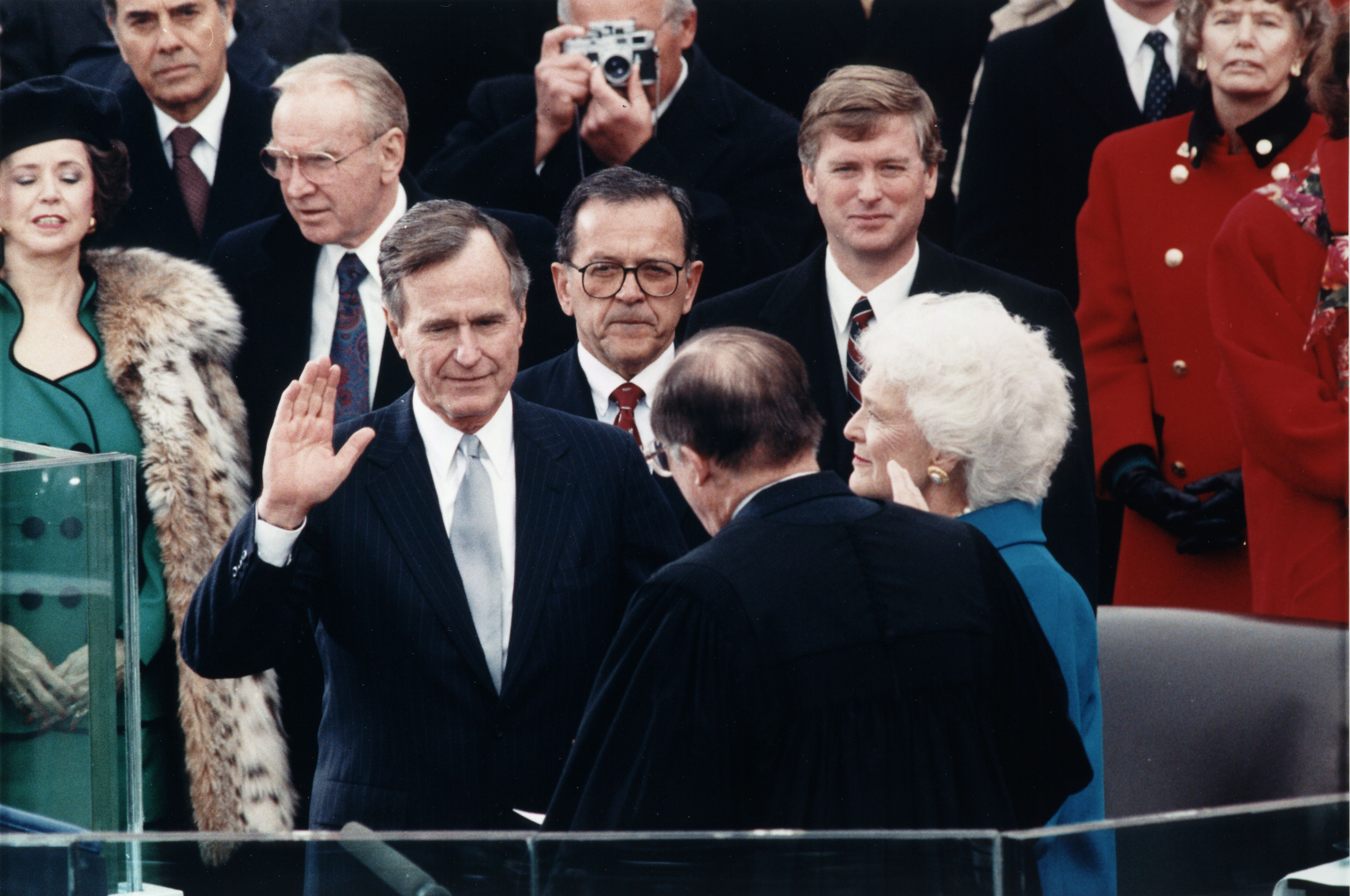
Chief Justice William Rehnquist administering the oath of office to President Bush during Inaugural ceremonies at the United States Capitol, January 20, 1989.

Bush was inaugurated on January 20, 1989, succeeding Ronald Reagan. He entered office at a period of change in the world; the fall of the Berlin Wall and the collapse of Soviet Union came in his presidency. In his inaugural address, Bush said:

I come before you and assume the Presidency at a moment rich with promise. We live in a peaceful, prosperous time, but we can make it better. For a new breeze is blowing, and a world refreshed by freedom seems reborn; for in man's heart, if not in fact, the day of the dictator is over. The totalitarian era is passing, its old ideas blown away like leaves from an ancient, lifeless tree. A new breeze is blowing, and a nation refreshed by freedom stands ready to push on. There is new ground to be broken, and new action to be taken.

Bush would go on to describe his vision of the nation, saying:

America today is a proud, free nation, decent and civil, a place we cannot help but love. We know in our hearts, not loudly and proudly, but as a simple fact, that this country has meaning beyond what we see, and that our strength is a force for good. But have we changed as a nation even in our time? Are we enthralled with material things, less appreciative of the nobility of work and sacrifice? My friends, we are not the sum of our possessions. They are not the measure of our lives. In our hearts we know what matters. We cannot hope only to leave our children a bigger car, a bigger bank account. We must hope to give them a sense of what it means to be a loyal friend, a loving parent, a citizen who leaves his home, his neighborhood and town better than he found it. What do we want the men and women who work with us to say when we are no longer there? That we were more driven to succeed than anyone around us? Or that we stopped to ask if a sick child had gotten better, and stayed a moment there to trade a word of friendship?

== Administration ==
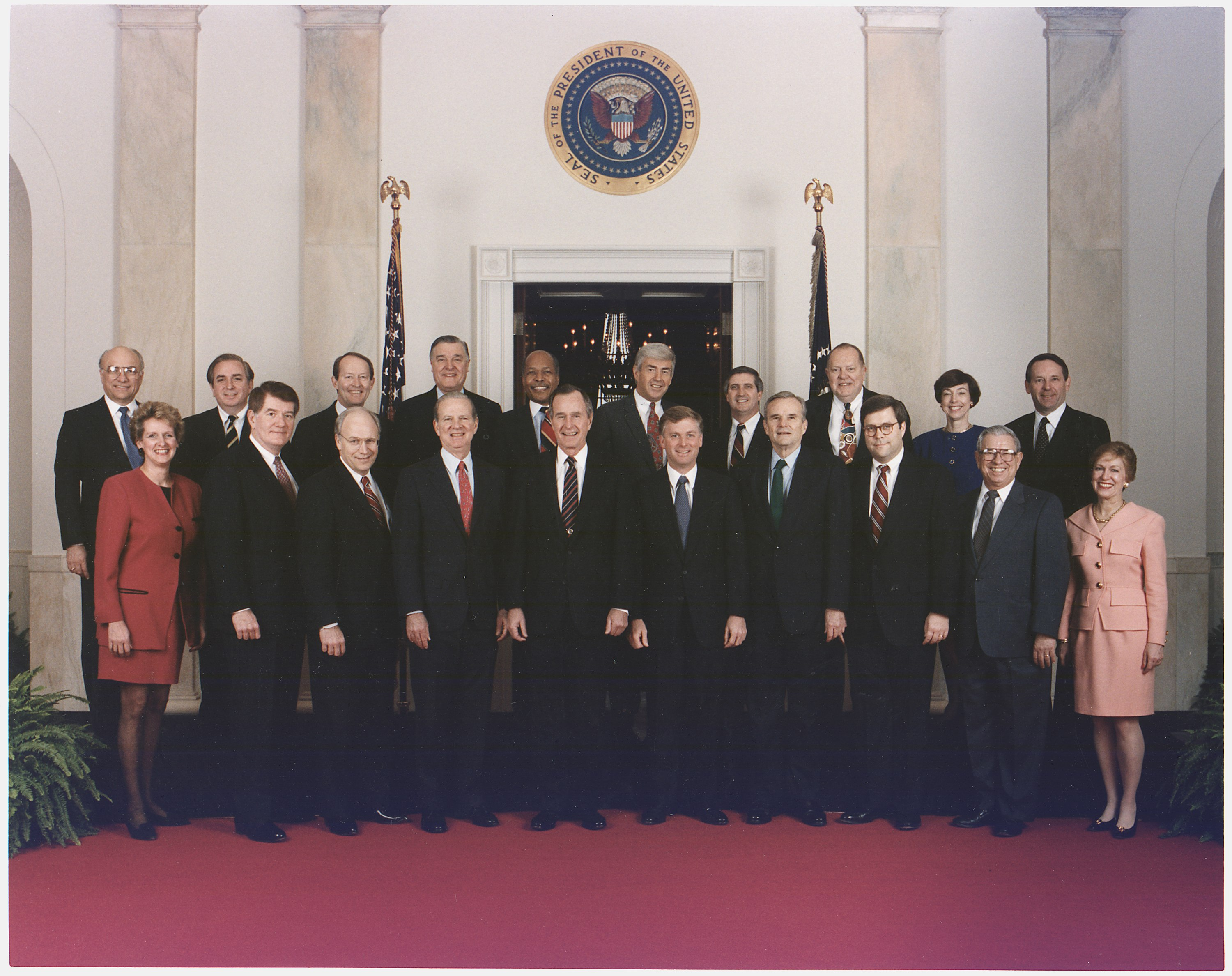
President George H. W. Bush and his cabinet in 1992

Bush cabinet
Office	Name	Term
President	George H. W. Bush	1989–1993
Vice President	Dan Quayle	1989–1993
Secretary of State	James Baker	1989–1992
Lawrence Eagleburger	1992–1993
Secretary of the Treasury	Nicholas F. Brady	1988–1993
Secretary of Defense	Dick Cheney	1989–1993
Attorney General	Dick Thornburgh	1988–1991
William Barr	1991–1993
Secretary of the Interior	Manuel Lujan Jr.	1989–1993
Secretary of Agriculture	Clayton Yeutter	1989–1991
Ed Madigan	1991–1993
Secretary of Commerce	Robert Mosbacher	1989–1992
Barbara Franklin	1992–1993
Secretary of Labor	Elizabeth Dole	1989–1990
Lynn M. Martin	1991–1993
Secretary of Health and Human Services	Louis W. Sullivan	1989–1993
Secretary of Housing and Urban Development	Jack Kemp	1989–1993
Secretary of Transportation	Samuel K. Skinner	1989–1991
Andrew Card	1992–1993
Secretary of Energy	James D. Watkins	1989–1993
Secretary of Education	Lauro Cavazos	1988–1990
Lamar Alexander	1991–1993
Secretary of Veterans Affairs	Ed Derwinski	1989–1992
Director of the Office of Management and Budget	Richard Darman	1989–1993
United States Trade Representative	Carla Anderson Hills	1989–1993
White House Chief of Staff	John H. Sununu	1989–1991
Samuel K. Skinner	1991–1992
James Baker	1992–1993
Counselor to the President	none	1989–1992
Clayton Yeutter	1992–1993

Bush's first major appointment was that of James Baker as Secretary of State; Baker was Bush's closest friend and had served as Reagan's White House chief of staff. Bush's first pick for Defense Secretary, John Tower, was rejected by the Senate, becoming the first cabinet nominee of an incoming president to be rejected. Leadership of the Department of Defense instead went to Dick Cheney, who had previously served as Gerald Ford's chief of staff and would later serve as vice president under George W. Bush. Kemp joined the administration as Secretary of Housing and Urban Development, while Elizabeth Dole, the wife of Bob Dole and a former secretary of transportation, became the secretary of labor under Bush. Bush retained several Reagan officials, including Secretary of the Treasury Nicholas F. Brady, Attorney General Dick Thornburgh, and Secretary of Education Lauro Cavazos.

Like most of his predecessors since Richard Nixon, Bush concentrated executive power in the Executive Office of the President. New Hampshire governor John H. Sununu, a strong supporter of Bush during the 1988 campaign, became chief of staff. Sununu would oversee the administration's domestic policy until his resignation in 1991. Richard Darman, who had previously served in the Treasury Department, became the director of the Office of Management and Budget. Brent Scowcroft was appointed as the national security advisor, a role he had also held under Ford. In the aftermath of the Reagan era Iran–Contra affair, Bush and Scowcroft reorganized the National Security Council, vesting power in it as an important policy-making body. Scowcroft's deputy, Robert Gates, emerged as an influential member of the National Security Council. Another important foreign policy adviser was General Colin Powell, a former national security advisor who Bush selected as Chairman of the Joint Chiefs of Staff in 1989.

Beginning mid-May 1991, several damaging stories about Sununu, many of them involving taxpayer funded trips on air force jets, surfaced. Bush was reluctant to dismiss Sununu until December 1991, when Sununu was forced to resign. Secretary of Transportation Samuel K. Skinner, who earned plaudits for his handling of the Exxon Valdez oil spill, replaced Sununu as chief of staff. Clayton Yeutter also joined the administration as a counselor to the president for domestic policy. Baker became chief of staff in August 1992 and was succeeded as Secretary of State by Lawrence Eagleburger.

Vice President Quayle enjoyed warm relations with Bush, and he served as a liaison to conservative members of Congress. However, his influence did not rival that of leading staffers and cabinet members like Baker and Sununu. Quayle was often mocked for his verbal gaffes, and opinion polls taken in mid-1992 showed him to be the least popular vice president since Spiro Agnew. Some Republicans urged Bush to dump Quayle from the ticket in 1992, but Bush decided that picking a new running mate would be a mistake.

== Judicial appointments ==
=== Supreme Court ===
Bush appointed two justices to the Supreme Court of the United States. In 1990, Bush appointed a largely unknown state appellate judge, David Souter, to replace liberal icon William Brennan. Souter had come under consideration for the Supreme Court vacancy through the efforts of Chief of Staff Sununu, a fellow native of New Hampshire. Souter was easily confirmed and served until 2009, but joined the liberal bloc of the court, disappointing Bush. In 1991, Bush nominated conservative federal judge Clarence Thomas to succeed Thurgood Marshall, a long-time liberal stalwart. Thomas, the former head of the Equal Employment Opportunity Commission (EEOC), faced heavy opposition in the Senate, as well as from pro-choice groups and the NAACP. His nomination faced another difficulty when Anita Hill accused Thomas of having sexually harassed her during his time as the chair of EEOC. Thomas won confirmation in a narrow 52–48 vote; 41 Republicans and 11 Democrats voted to confirm Thomas's nomination, while 46 Democrats and 2 Republicans voted against confirmation. Thomas became one of the most conservative justices of his era, who would go on to contribute to landmark Supreme Court decisions, such as Dobbs v. Jackson Women's Health Organization (2022).

=== Other courts ===
Bush sent candidates selected by the Justice Department to the Senate, including 42 judges to the United States courts of appeals, and 148 judges to the United States district courts. Among these appointments were future Supreme Court justice Samuel Alito, as well as Vaughn R. Walker, who was later revealed to be the earliest known gay federal judge. Bush also experienced a number of judicial appointment controversies, as 11 nominees for 10 federal appellate judgeships were not processed by the Democratically controlled Senate Judiciary Committee. Nonetheless, by the end of Bush's tenure, Republican appointees made up a majority of the membership of each of the thirteen federal appeals courts.

== Foreign affairs ==
Bush made 26 international trips to 37 different countries during his presidency.

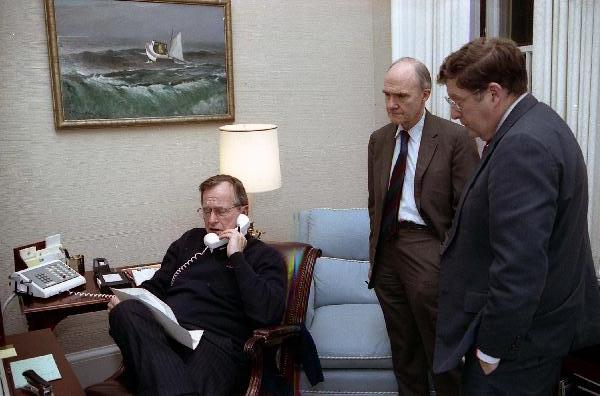
Bush speaks on the telephone regarding Operation Just Cause with General Brent Scowcroft and Chief of Staff John H. Sununu, 1989

The main themes of the Bush foreign policy were:

- End of the Cold War: The most significant foreign policy achievement of the Bush administration was overseeing the peaceful end of the Cold War. Bush played a crucial role in managing the transition as the Soviet Union dissolved, ensuring stability and avoiding a potential conflict between the two superpowers.
- Strategic Arms Reduction: Bush pursued arms control agreements with the Soviet Union to reduce the nuclear weapons arsenals of both countries. He signed the Strategic Arms Reduction Treaty (START I) with Soviet President Mikhail Gorbachev, leading to substantial reductions in nuclear weapons stockpiles.
- Gulf War: Bush led an international coalition in response to Iraq's invasion of Kuwait in 1990. The Gulf War aimed to liberate Kuwait and protect regional stability. The operation, known as Operation Desert Storm, successfully expelled Iraqi forces from Kuwait but stopped short of removing Saddam Hussein from power.
- Multilateralism and Coalition-Building: Bush emphasized the importance of multilateralism and building international coalitions to address global challenges. This approach was evident in the Gulf War, where he garnered support from numerous nations and assembled a coalition of forces.
- Support for Democracy and Human Rights: Bush advocated for democracy and human rights worldwide. He backed democratic transitions in Eastern Europe after the fall of the Berlin Wall and supported pro-democracy movements in countries like China and Myanmar (formerly Burma). He invaded Panama to remove a dictator who violated human rights.
- Free Trade: Bush was a strong advocate for free trade. He negotiated and signed the North American Free Trade Agreement (NAFTA) between the United States, Canada, and Mexico, aiming to enhance economic cooperation and remove trade barriers.
- China Policy: Bush sought to improve relations with China and expand economic ties while also urging progress on human rights. He played a role in normalizing diplomatic relations with China and supported its entry into the World Trade Organization (WTO).
- Mideast Peace Process: Bush made efforts to advance the Middle East peace process. He hosted the 1991 Madrid Conference, which brought together Israeli and Arab leaders for peace talks, setting the stage for future negotiations.

=== Panama: Operation Just Cause ===
During the 1980s, the U.S. had supplied aid to Manuel Noriega, an anti-Communist dictator of Panama who engaged in drug trafficking. In May 1989, Noriega annulled the results of a democratic presidential election. Bush objected to the annulment of the election and worried about the status of the Panama Canal seeing Noriega as a threat. After an American serviceman was killed by Noriega forces in December 1989, Bush ordered 24,000 troops into the country with an objective of removing Noriega from power. The United States invasion of Panama, known as "Operation Just Cause", was the first large-scale American military operation in more than 40 years that was not related to the Cold War. American forces quickly took control of the Panama Canal Zone and Panama City. Noriega surrendered on January 3, and was quickly transported for trial in the United States. Twenty-three Americans died in the operation, while another 394 were wounded. Noriega was convicted and imprisoned on racketeering and drug trafficking charges in April 1992. Historian Stewart Brewer argues that the invasion "represented a new era in American foreign policy" because Bush did not justify the invasion under the Monroe Doctrine or the threat of Communism, but rather on the grounds that it was in the best interests of the United States.

=== End of the Cold War ===
==== Fall of the Eastern Bloc ====
Map showing the division of East and West Germany until 1990, with West Berlin in yellow.

Reagan and Soviet general secretary Mikhail Gorbachev had eased Cold War tensions during Reagan's second term, but Bush was initially skeptical of Soviet intentions. During the first year of his tenure, Bush pursued what Soviets referred to as the pauza, a break in Reagan's détente policies. While Bush implemented his pauza policy in 1989, Soviet satellites in Eastern Europe challenged Soviet domination. In 1989, Communist governments fell in Poland, Hungary, Czechoslovakia, while the governments of Bulgaria and Romania instituted major reforms. In November 1989, the government of East Germany opened the Berlin Wall, and it was subsequently demolished by gleeful Berliners. Many Soviet leaders urged Gorbachev to crush the dissidents in Eastern Europe, but Gorbachev declined to send in the Soviet military, effectively abandoning the Brezhnev Doctrine. The U.S. was not directly involved in these upheavals, but the Bush administration avoided the appearance of gloating over the demise of the Eastern Bloc to avoid undermining further democratic reforms. Bush also helped convince Polish leaders to allow democratic elections and became the first sitting U.S. president to visit Hungary.

By mid-1989, as unrest blanketed Eastern Europe, Bush requested a meeting with Gorbachev, and the two agreed to hold the December 1989 Malta Summit. After the Malta summit, Bush sought cooperative relations with Gorbachev throughout the remainder of his term, believing that the Soviet leader was the key to peacefully ending the Soviet domination of Eastern Europe. In May 1990 Bush identified free elections, political pluralism, and the rule of law as the cornerstones of freedom and urged that they be enshrined among the principles of the 35-nation Conference on Security and Cooperation in Europe (CSCE). By June, with the help of Max Kampelman, this major historic achievement the security architecture of Europe was anchored.

While Britain and France were wary of a re-unified Germany, Bush pushed for German reunification alongside West German chancellor Helmut Kohl. Gorbachev also resisted the idea of a reunified Germany, especially if it became part of NATO, but the upheavals of the previous year had sapped his power at home and abroad. "Two-Plus-Four" talks among the U.S., the Soviet Union, France, Britain, West Germany, and East Germany began in 1990. After extensive negotiations, Gorbachev eventually agreed to allow a reunified Germany to be a part of NATO. With the signing of the Treaty on the Final Settlement with Respect to Germany, Germany officially reunified in October 1990.

==== Dissolution of the Soviet Union ====
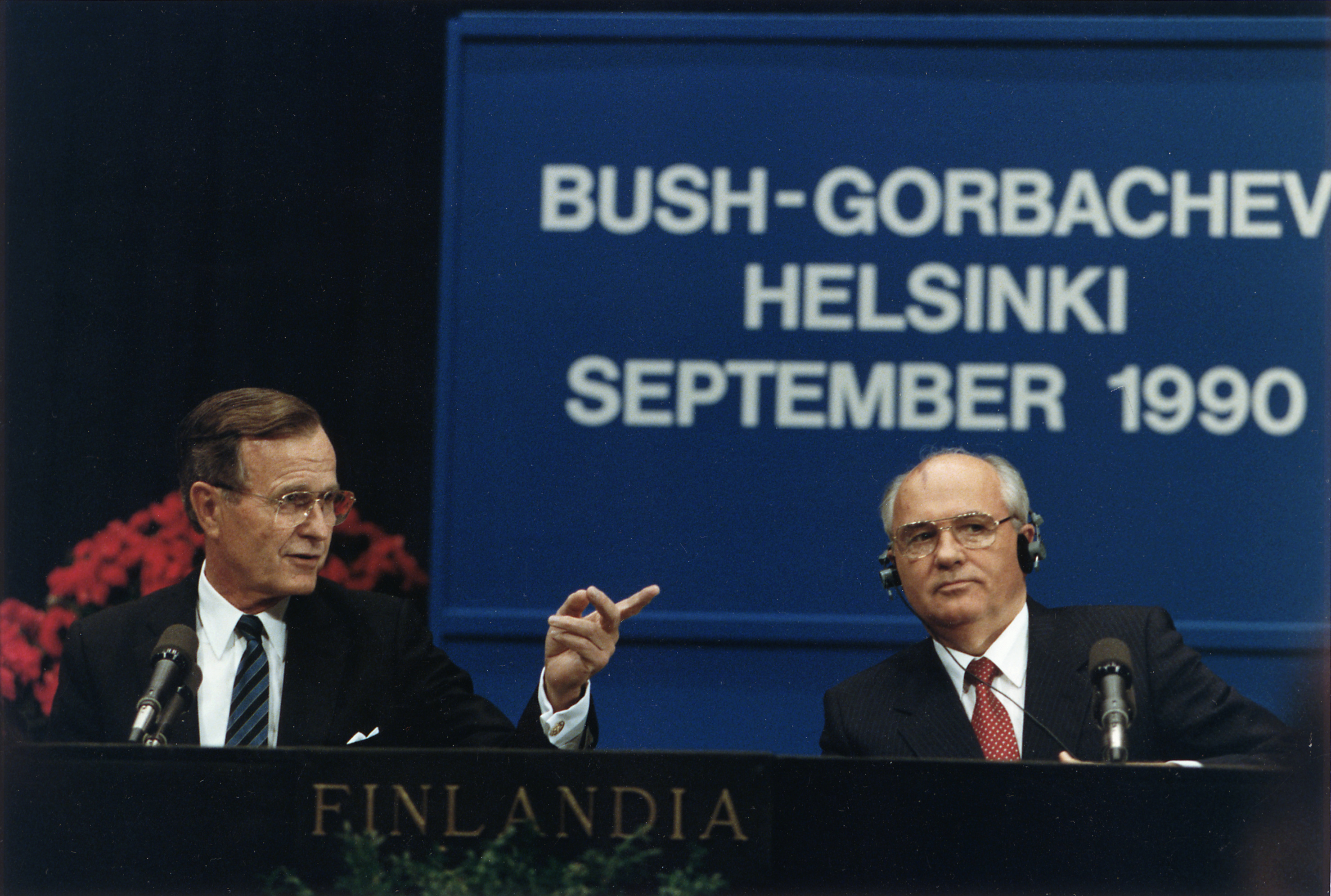
Bush and Mikhail Gorbachev at the Helsinki Summit in 1990

Gorbachev suppressed nationalist movements within the Soviet Union itself. The Soviet Union had occupied and annexed the Baltic states of Lithuania, Latvia, and Estonia in the 1940s, and many of the residents had never accepted Soviet rule. Lithuania's March 1990 proclamation of independence was strongly opposed by Gorbachev, who feared that the Soviet Union could fall apart if he allowed Lithuania's independence. The United States had never recognized the Soviet incorporation of the Baltic states, and the crisis in Lithuania left Bush in a difficult position. Bush needed Gorbachev's cooperation in the reunification of Germany, and he feared that the collapse of the Soviet Union could leave nuclear arms in dangerous hands. Bush warned independence movements of the disorder that could come with secession from the Soviet Union; in a 1991 address that critics labeled the "Chicken Kiev speech", he cautioned against "suicidal nationalism".

In August 1991, hard-line Communists launched a coup against Gorbachev; while the coup quickly fell apart, it broke the remaining power of Gorbachev and the central Soviet government. Later that month, Gorbachev resigned as general secretary of the Communist party, and Russian president Boris Yeltsin ordered Russia to seize property previously controlled by the Kremlin. Gorbachev's power evaporated but he clung to nominal office as the president of the Soviet Union until December 1991, when the Soviet Union dissolved. Fifteen states emerged from the USSR, and of those states, Russia was the largest and most populous. Bush and Yeltsin met in February 1992, declaring a new era of friendship. In January 1993, Bush and Yeltsin agreed to START II, which provided for further nuclear arms reductions on top of the original START treaty.

The United States and the Soviet Union had been the two superpowers, and now only the USA remained in that status.

=== Gulf War ===
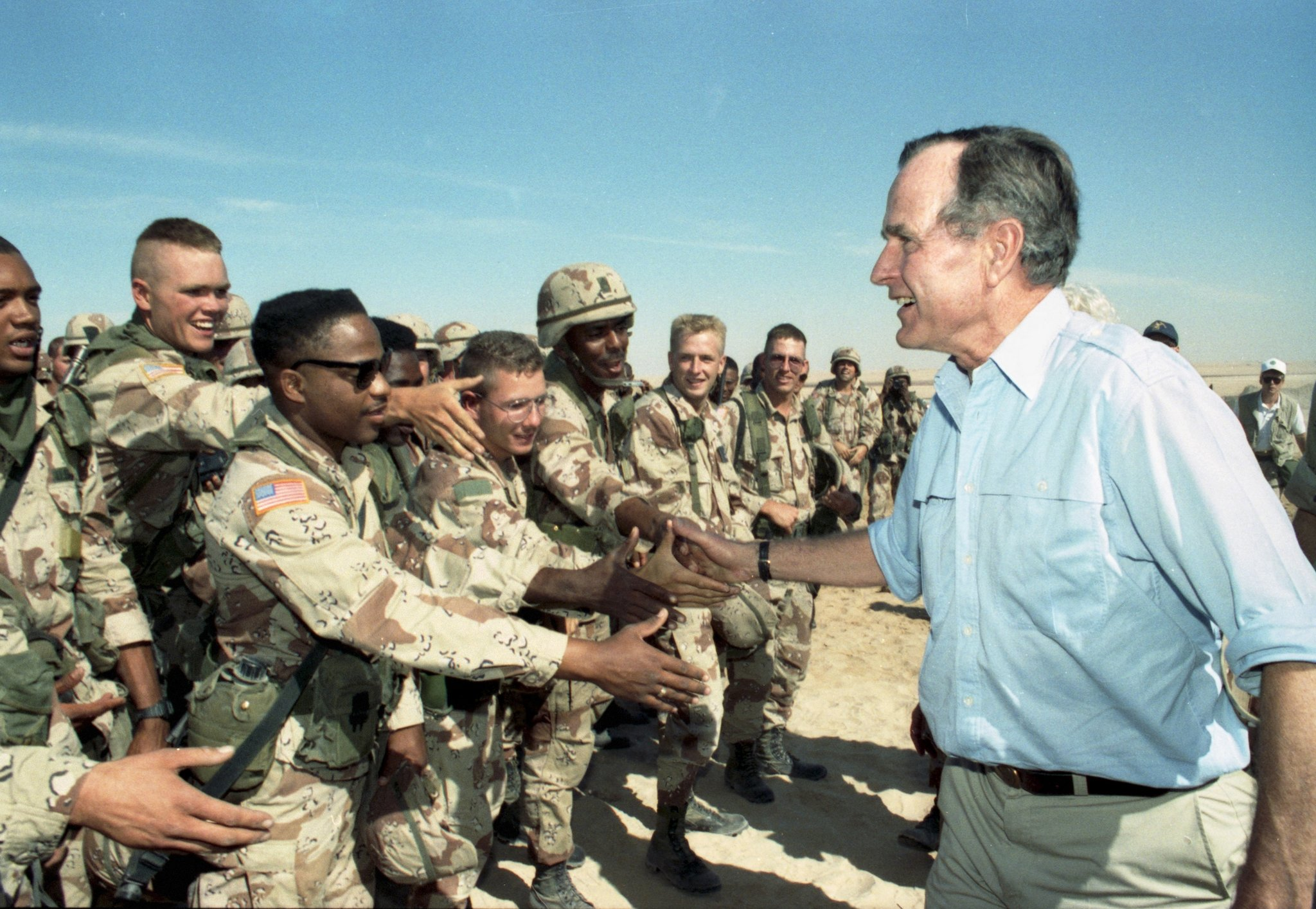
President Bush visited American troops in Saudi Arabia on Thanksgiving Day, 1990

Iraq (green) invaded Kuwait (orange) in 1990

==== Iraqi invasion of Kuwait ====
Under the leadership of Saddam Hussein, Iraq had invaded Iran in 1980, beginning the Iran–Iraq War, which finally ended in 1988. The U.S. had supported Iraq during that war due to U.S. hostility towards Iran, but Bush decided not to renew loans to Iraq because of Hussein's brutal crack-down on dissent and his threats to attack Israel. Faced with massive debts and low oil prices, Hussein decided to conquer the country of Kuwait, a small, oil-rich country situated on Iraq's southern border.

After Iraq invaded Kuwait in August 1990, Bush imposed economic sanctions on Iraq and assembled a multi-national coalition opposed to the invasion. The administration feared that a failure to respond to the invasion would embolden Hussein to attack Saudi Arabia or Israel, and wanted to discourage other countries from similar aggression. Many in the international community agreed; Margaret Thatcher stated that "if Iraq wins, no small state is safe." Bush also wanted to ensure continued access to oil, as Iraq and Kuwait collectively accounted for 20 percent of the world's oil production, and Saudi Arabia produced another 26 percent of the world's oil supply.

In preparation for a military operation against Iraq, the United States transferred thousands of soldiers to Saudi Arabia, and General Norman Schwarzkopf Jr. developed an invasion plan. For several weeks, the Bush administration considered the possibility of foregoing the use of force against Iraq, with the hope that economic sanctions and international pressure would eventually convince Hussein to withdraw from Kuwait. At Bush's insistence, in November 1990, the United Nations Security Council approved a resolution authorizing the use of force if Iraq did not withdrawal from Kuwait by January 15, 1991. Gorbachev's support, as well as China's abstention, helped ensure passage of the UN resolution. Bush convinced Britain, France, and other nations to commit soldiers to an operation against Iraq, and he won important financial backing from Germany, Japan, South Korea, Saudi Arabia, and the United Arab Emirates.

==== Operation Desert Storm ====
In January 1991, Bush asked Congress to approve a joint resolution authorizing a war against Iraq. Bush believed that the UN resolution had already provided him with the necessary authorization to launch a military operation against Iraq, but he wanted to show that the nation was united behind a military action. In a September 1990 address before a joint session of Congress, Bush had laid out four immediate objectives: "Iraq must withdraw from Kuwait completely, immediately, and without condition. Kuwait's legitimate government must be restored. The security and stability of the Persian Gulf must be assured. And American citizens abroad must be protected." He then outlined a fifth, long-term objective: "Out of these troubled times, our fifth objective – a new world order – can emerge: a new era – freer from the threat of terror, stronger in the pursuit of justice, and more secure in the quest for peace. An era in which the nations of the world, East and West, North and South, can prosper and live in harmony.... A world where the rule of law supplants the rule of the jungle. A world in which nations recognize the shared responsibility for freedom and justice. A world where the strong respect the rights of the weak." Despite the opposition of a majority of Democrats in both the House and the Senate, Congress approved the Authorization for Use of Military Force Against Iraq Resolution of 1991.

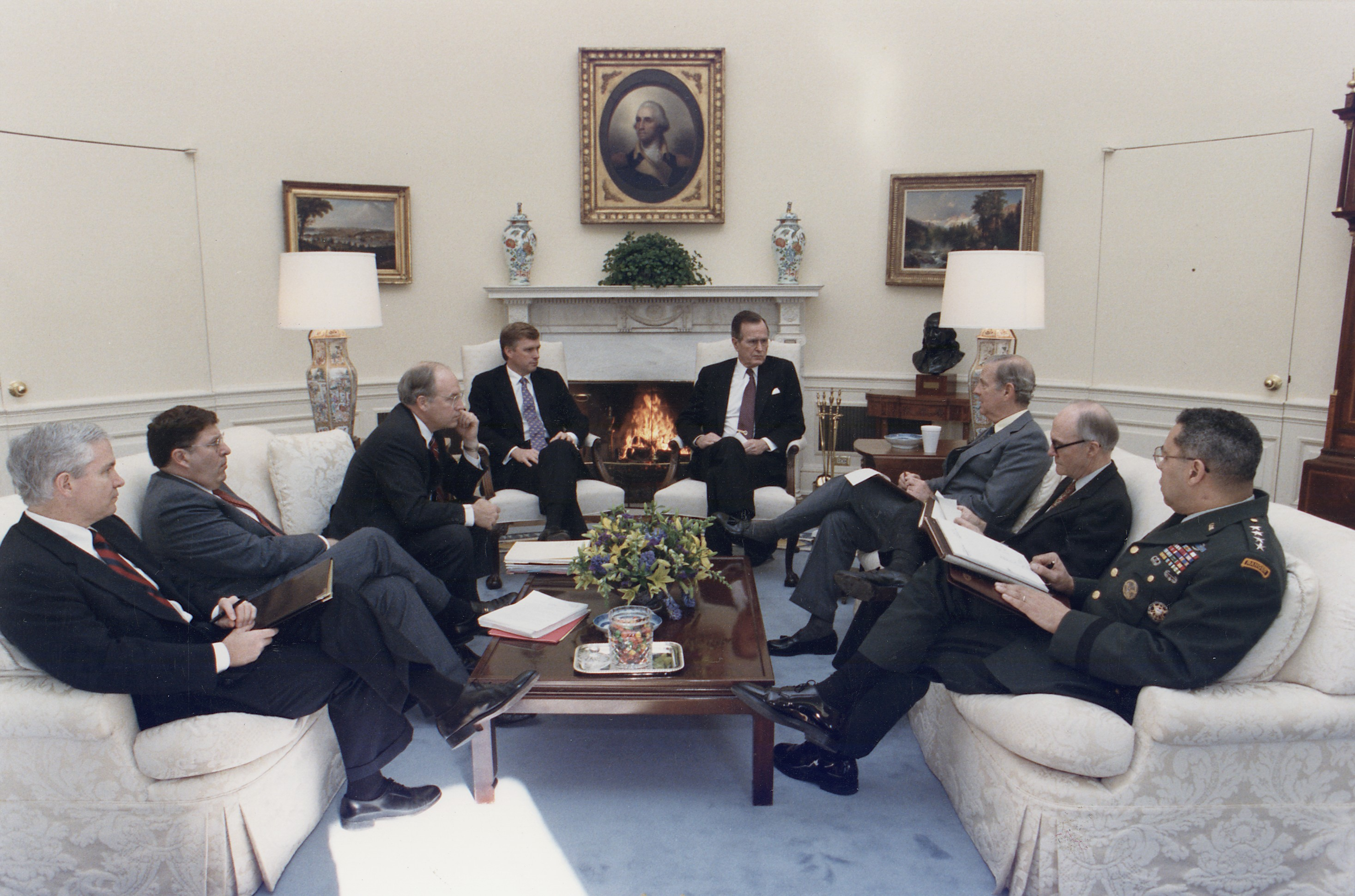
Bush meets with Robert Gates, General Colin Powell, Secretary Dick Cheney and others about the situation in the Persian Gulf and Operation Desert Shield, January 15, 1991

After the January 15 deadline passed without an Iraqi withdrawal from Kuwait, U.S. and coalition forces began a 39-day bombing of the Iraqi capital of Baghdad and other Iraqi positions. The bombing devastated Iraq's power grid and communications network, and resulted in the desertion of about 100,000 Iraqi soldiers. In retaliation, Iraq launched Scud missiles at Israel and Saudi Arabia, but most of the missiles did little damage. On February 23, coalition forces began a ground invasion into Kuwait, evicting Iraqi forces by the end of February 27. About 300 Americans, as well as approximately 65 soldiers from other coalition nations, died during the military action. A cease fire was arranged on March 3, and the UN passed a resolution establishing a peacekeeping force in a demilitarized zone between Kuwait and Iraq. A March 1991 Gallup poll showed that Bush had an approval rating of 89 percent, the highest presidential approval rating in the history of Gallup polling.

During the military action, the coalition forces did not pursue Iraqi forces across the border, leaving Hussein and his elite Republican Guard in control of Iraq. Bush explained that he did not give the order to overthrow the Iraqi government because it would have "incurred incalculable human and political costs.... We would have been forced to occupy Baghdad and, in effect, rule Iraq." His decision not to press the attack remains controversial. As Secretary of Defense Cheney noted, "Once we had rounded Hussein up and gotten rid of his government, then the question is what do you put in his place?" In the aftermath of the war, the Bush administration encouraged rebellions against Iraq, and Kurds and Shia Arabs both rose against Hussein. The U.S. declined to intervene in the rebellion, and Hussein violently suppressed the uprisings. After 1991, the UN maintained economic sanctions against Iraq, and the United Nations Special Commission was assigned to ensure that Iraq did not revive its weapons of mass destruction program.

=== China ===
One of Bush's priorities was strengthening relations between the U.S. and the People's Republic of China (PRC), and Bush had developed a warm relationship with Chinese leader Deng Xiaoping prior to taking office. Despite the personal rapport between Bush and Deng, human rights issues presented a serious challenge to Bush's China policy. In mid-1989, students and other individuals protested in favor of democracy and intellectual freedom across two hundred cities in the PRC. In June 1989, the People's Liberation Army violently suppressed a demonstration in Beijing in what became known as the Tiananmen Square Massacre. Bush was eager to maintain good relations with the PRC, which had drawn increasingly closer to the United States since the 1970s, but he was outraged by the PRC's handling of the protests. In response to the Tiananmen Square Massacre, the United States imposed economic sanctions and cut military ties. However, Bush also decided that Tiananmen should not interrupt Sino-U.S. relations. Thus he secretly sent special envoy Brent Scowcroft to Beijing to meet with Deng, and, the economic sanctions that had been levied against China were lifted. George Washington University revealed that, through high-level secret channels on 30 June 1989, the US government conveyed to the government of the People's Republic of China that the events around the Tiananmen Square protests were an "internal affair". Fang Lizhi and his wife remained in the US Embassy until 25 June 1990, when they were allowed by Chinese authorities to leave the embassy and board a U.S. Air Force C-135 transport plane to Britain. This resolution partly came about after confidential negotiations between Henry Kissinger, acting on behalf of U.S. president Bush, and Deng. Other factors were a false confession by Fang, an attempted intervention by Scowcroft, and an offer from the Japanese government to resume loans to the PRC in return for the resolution of "the Fang Lizhi problem."

=== NAFTA ===
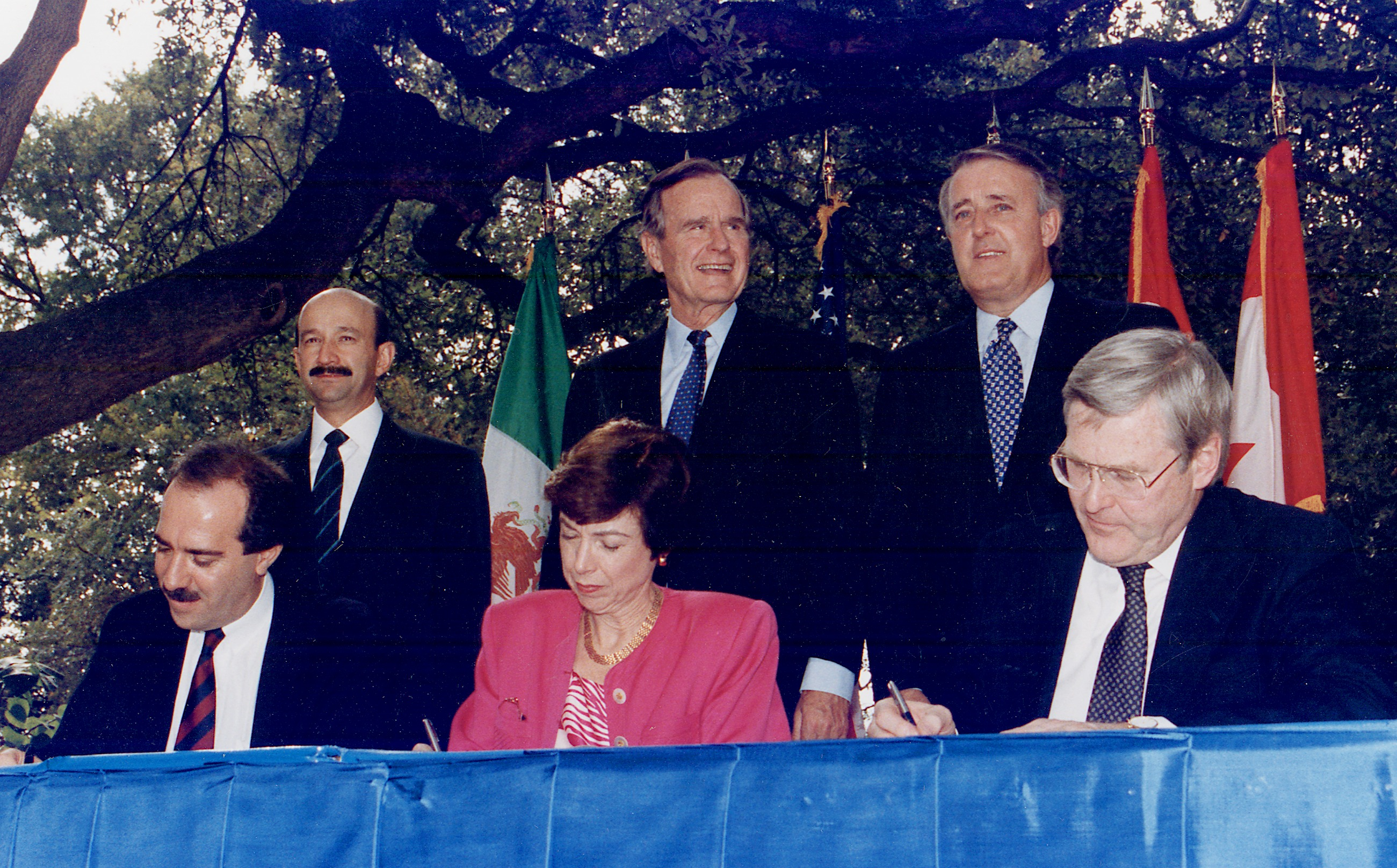
From left to right: (standing) President Carlos Salinas, President Bush, Prime Minister Brian Mulroney; (seated) Jaime Serra Puche, Carla Hills, and Michael Wilson at the NAFTA Initialing Ceremony, October 1992

In 1987, the U.S. and Canada had reached a free trade agreement that eliminated many tariffs between the two countries. President Reagan had intended it as the first step towards a larger trade agreement to eliminate most tariffs among the United States, Canada, and Mexico. Mexico had resisted becoming involved in the agreement at the time, but Carlos Salinas de Gortari expressed a willingness to negotiate a free trade agreement after he took office in 1988. The Bush administration, along with the Progressive Conservative Canadian prime minister Brian Mulroney, spearheaded the negotiations of the North American Free Trade Agreement (NAFTA) with Mexico. In addition to lowering tariffs, the proposed treaty would restrict patents, copyrights, and trademarks.

In 1991, Bush sought fast track authority, which grants the president the power to submit an international trade agreement to Congress without the possibility of amendment. Despite congressional opposition led by House majority leader Dick Gephardt, both houses of Congress voted to grant Bush fast track authority. NAFTA was signed in December 1992, after Bush lost re-election, but President Clinton won ratification of NAFTA in 1993. NAFTA remains controversial for its impact on wages, jobs, and overall economic growth. President Donald Trump denounced NAFTA but signed a new treaty with Canada and Mexico in 2020 that made few changes.

== Domestic affairs ==
Faced with several issues, Bush refrained from proposing major domestic programs during his tenure. He did, however, make frequent use of the presidential veto, and used the threat of the veto to influence legislation.

=== Economy ===
Federal finances and GDP during the George H. W. Bush presidency
Fiscal Year	Receipts	Outlays	Surplus/ Deficit	GDP (in billions)	Debt as a % of GDP
1989	991.1	1,143.7	−152.6	5,554.7	39.4
1990	1,032.0	1,253.0	−221.0	5,898.8	40.9
1991	1,055.0	1,324.2	−269.2	6,093.2	44.1
1992	1,091.2	1,381.5	−290.3	6,416.3	46.8
1993	1,154.3	1,409.4	−255.1	6,775.3	47.9
Ref.					

The U.S. economy had generally performed well since emerging from recession in late 1982, but finally slipped into a mild recession in 1990. The unemployment rate rose from 5.4 percent in January 1989 to a high of 7.8 percent in June 1992. A number of highly publicized early layoffs by companies like Aetna led some to call it a "white-collar recession". In point of fact, by late 1991 there had been more than a million blue-collar jobs lost compared to approximately 200,000 white-collar jobs lost for a 5-to-1 ratio. Even so, this was still more of a "white collar" recession by comparison than the early 1980s double-dip recession had been. Explanations for the economic slowdown varied; some Bush supporters blamed Federal Reserve Chairman Alan Greenspan for failing to lower interest rates.

The large federal deficits, spawned during the Reagan years, rose from $152.1 billion in 1989 to $220 billion for 1990; the $220 billion deficit represented a threefold increase since 1980. The chief factors pushing the federal deficit upward going in to 1991 were the weak economy, which was depressing both corporate profits and household incomes, and a bailout for the savings and loans industry, which cost more than $100 billion over multiple years. By the end of 1991, polls showed significant public discontent with Bush's handling of the economy. As the public became increasingly concerned about the economy and other domestic affairs, Bush's well-received handling of foreign affairs became less of an issue for most voters. Several congressional Republicans and economists urged Bush to respond to the recession, but the administration was unable to develop an economic plan.

=== 1990 budget reconciliation process ===
As he was opposed to major defense spending cuts and had pledged to not raise taxes, the president had major difficulties in balancing the budget. Bush and congressional leaders agreed to avoid major changes to the budget for fiscal year 1990, which began in October 1989. However, both sides knew that spending cuts or new taxes would be necessary in the following year's budget in order to avoid the draconian automatic domestic spending cuts required by the Gramm–Rudman–Hollings Balanced Budget Act.

The administration engaged in lengthy negotiations for the passage of the fiscal year 1991 budget. In January 1990, Bush submitted his budget for fiscal year 1991; the budget included cuts to defense spending and the capital gains tax. In March, Congressman Dan Rostenkowski put forward the Democratic counter-proposal, which included an increase in the gasoline tax. In a statement released in late June 1990, Bush said that he would be open to a deficit reduction program which included spending cuts, incentives for economic growth, budget process reform, as well as tax increases. To fiscal conservatives in the Republican Party, Bush's statement represented a betrayal, and they heavily criticized him for compromising so early in the negotiations.

In September 1990, Bush and congressional Democrats announced a compromise to cut funding for mandatory and discretionary programs while also raising revenue, partly through a higher gas tax. The compromise additionally included a "pay as you go" provision that required that new programs be paid for at the time of implementation. Though he had previously promised to support the bill, House minority whip Newt Gingrich led the conservative opposition to the bill. Liberals also criticized the budget cuts in the compromise, and in October, the House rejected the deal, resulting in a brief government shutdown. Without the strong backing of the Republican Party, Bush was forced to agree to another compromise bill, this one more favorable to Democrats. The Omnibus Budget Reconciliation Act of 1990 (OBRA-90), enacted on October 27, 1990, dropped much of the gasoline tax increase in favor of higher income taxes on top earners. It included cuts to domestic spending, but the cuts were not as deep as those that had been proposed in the original compromise. Bush's decision to sign the bill damaged his standing with conservatives and the general public, but it also laid the groundwork for the budget surpluses of the late 1990s.

=== Education ===
Though Bush generally refrained from making major proposals for new domestic programs, he stated his intention to be an education and environmental president. A 1983 report, titled A Nation at Risk, had raised concern about the quality of the American educational system. Bush proposed the Educational Excellence Act of 1989, a plan to reward high-performing schools with federal grants and provide support for the establishment of magnet schools. Bush's education platform consisted mainly of offering federal support for a variety of innovations, such as open enrollment, incentive pay for outstanding teachers, and rewards for schools that improve performance with underprivileged children. Conservatives, who generally sought to shrink the role of the federal government in education, opposed the bill. Liberals opposed the proposed vouchers for private schools, were wary of the student testing designed to ensure higher educational standards, and favored higher levels of federal spending on educational programs for minorities and the economically disadvantaged. Bush believed that educational costs should primarily be borne by state and local governments, and he did not favor dramatically raising the overall level of federal funding for education. Because of the lack of support from both liberals and conservatives, Congress did not act on his education proposals. Bush later introduced the voluntary "America 2000" program, which sought to rally business leaders and local governments around education reform. Though Bush did not pass a major educational reform package during his presidency, his ideas influenced later reform efforts, including Goals 2000 and the No Child Left Behind Act.

=== Civil rights ===
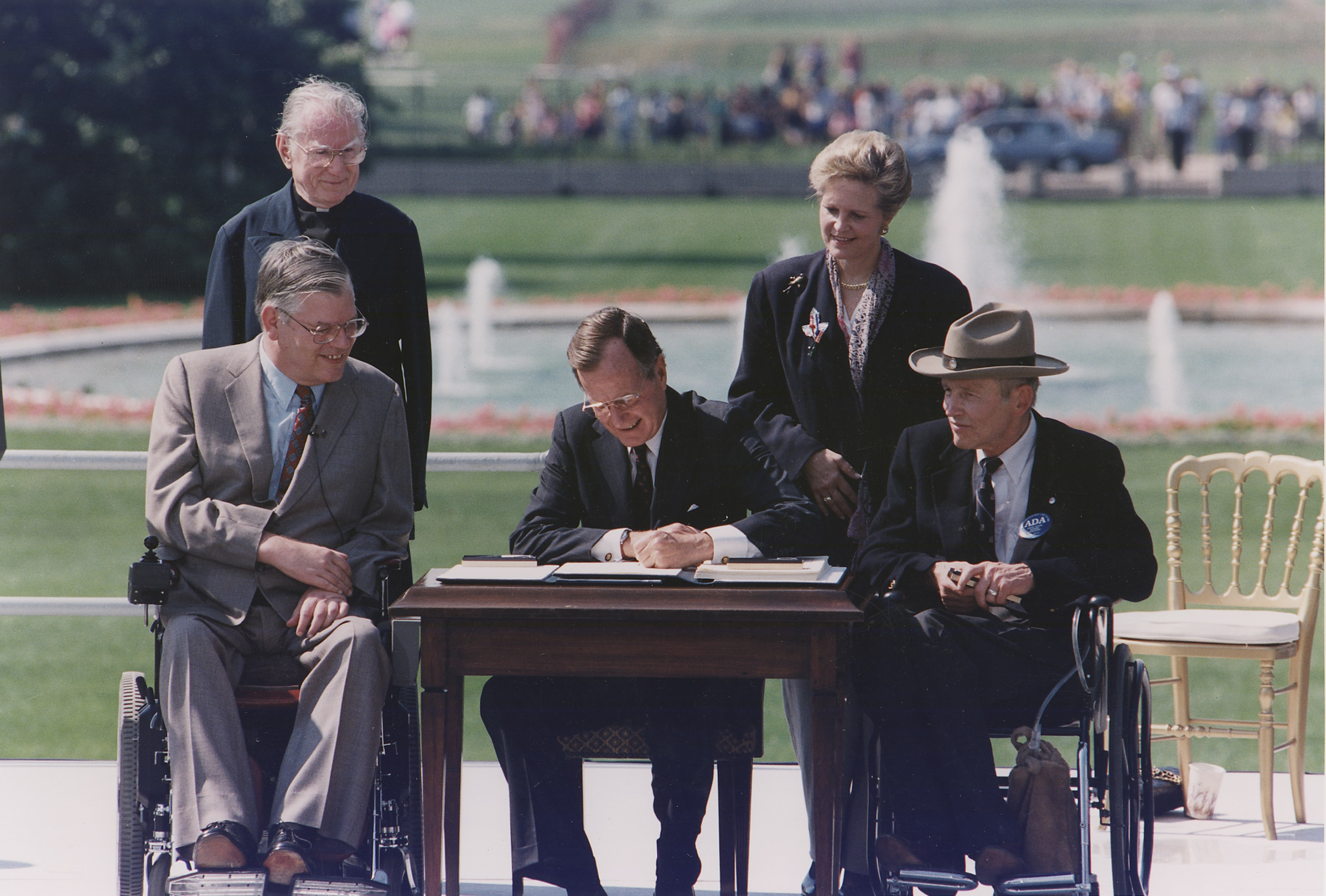
Bush signs the Americans with Disabilities Act of 1990

The disabled had not received legal protections under the landmark Civil Rights Act of 1964, and many faced discrimination and segregation as Bush took office. In 1988, Lowell P. Weicker Jr. and Tony Coelho had introduced the Americans with Disabilities Act, which barred employment discrimination against qualified individuals with disabilities. The bill had passed the Senate but not the House, and it was reintroduced in 1989. Though some conservatives opposed the bill due to its costs and potential burdens on businesses, Bush strongly supported it, partly because his son, Neil, had struggled with dyslexia. After the bill passed both houses of Congress, Bush signed the Americans with Disabilities Act of 1990 into law in July 1990. The act required employers and public accommodations to make "reasonable accommodations" for the disabled, while providing an exception when such accommodations imposed an "undue hardship".

After the Supreme Court handed down rulings that limited the enforcement of employment discrimination, Senator Ted Kennedy led passage of a bill known as the Civil Rights Act of 1990 which was designed to facilitate launching employment discrimination lawsuits. In vetoing the bill, Bush argued that it would lead to racial quotas in hiring. Congress failed to override the veto, but re-introduced the bill in 1991. In November 1991, Bush signed the Civil Rights Act of 1991, which was largely similar to the bill he had vetoed in the previous year.

=== Environment ===
In June 1989, the Bush administration proposed a bill to amend the Clean Air Act. Working with Senate majority leader George J. Mitchell, the administration won passage of the amendments over the opposition of business-aligned members of Congress who feared the impact of tougher regulations. The legislation sought to curb acid rain and smog by requiring decreased emissions of chemicals such as sulfur dioxide. The measure was the first major update to the Clean Air Act since 1977. Bush also signed the Oil Pollution Act of 1990 in response to the Exxon Valdez oil spill. However, the League of Conservation Voters criticized some of Bush's other environmental actions, including his opposition to stricter auto-mileage standards.

=== Employee Leave ===
On June 29, 1990, Bush vetoed a bill that would have provided leave for workers in situations of a child's birth, adoption, or family illness. On September 22, 1992, Bush vetoed a bill that would have allowed workers to take at least 12 weeks of unpaid leave. The Senate successfully voted to override Bush's veto, but the House didn't.

=== Savings and loan crisis ===
In 1982, Congress had passed the Garn–St. Germain Depository Institutions Act, which deregulated savings and loans associations and increased FDIC insurance for savings and loans associations. As the real estate market declined in the late 1980s, hundreds of savings and loans associations collapsed. In February 1989, Bush proposed a $50 billion package to rescue the saving and loans industry, the creation of the Office of Thrift Supervision to regulate the industry, and establishment the Resolution Trust Corporation to liquidate the assets of insolvent companies. Congress passed the Financial Institutions Reform, Recovery, and Enforcement Act of 1989, which incorporated most of Bush's proposals. In the wake of the savings and loan crisis, the Senate Ethics Committee investigated five senators, collectively referred to as the "Keating Five", for allegedly providing improper aid to Charles Keating, the chairman of the Lincoln Savings and Loan Association.

=== Points of Light ===
President Bush devoted attention to voluntary service as a means of solving some of America's most serious social problems. He often used the "thousand points of light" theme to describe the power of citizens to solve community problems. In his 1989 inaugural address, President Bush said, "I have spoken of a thousand points of light, of all the community organizations that are spread like stars throughout the Nation, doing good." Four years later, in his report to the nation on The Points of Light Movement, President Bush said, "Points of Light are the soul of America. They are ordinary people who reach beyond themselves to touch the lives of those in need, bringing hope and opportunity, care and friendship. By giving so generously of themselves, these remarkable individuals show us not only what is best in our heritage but what all of us are called to become."

In 1990, the Points of Light Foundation was created as a nonprofit organization in Washington to promote this spirit of volunteerism. In 2007, the Points of Light Foundation merged with the Hands On Network with the goal of strengthening volunteerism, streamlining costs and services and deepening impact. Points of Light, the organization created through this merger, has approximately 250 affiliates in the United States and abroad and partnerships with thousands of nonprofits and companies dedicated to volunteer service around the world. In 2012, Points of Light mobilized 4 million volunteers in 30 million hours of service worth $635 million.

=== Other initiatives ===
Bush signed the Immigration Act of 1990, which led to a 40 percent increase in legal immigration to the United States. The bill more than doubled the number of visas given to immigrants on the basis of job skills, and advocates of the bill argued that it would help fill projected labor shortages for various jobs. Bush had opposed an earlier version of the bill that allowed for higher immigration levels, but supported the bill that Congress ultimately presented to him.

Bush became a member of the National Rifle Association of America (NRA) early in 1988 and had campaigned as a "pro-gun" candidate with the NRA's endorsement during the 1988 election. In March 1989, he placed a temporary ban on the import of certain semiautomatic rifles. This action cost him endorsement from the NRA in 1992. In 1995, after leaving office, Bush publicly resigned his life membership in the organization after receiving a form letter from the NRA depicting agents of the Bureau of Alcohol, Tobacco, and Firearms as "jack-booted thugs".

In the 1989 case of Texas v. Johnson, the Supreme Court held that it was unconstitutional to criminalize burning the American flag. In response, Bush introduced a constitutional amendment empowering Congress to outlaw the desecration of the American flag. Congress did not pass the amendment, but Bush did sign the Flag Protection Act of 1989, which was later overturned by the Supreme Court.

Bush appointed William Bennett to serve as the first director of the Office of National Drug Control Policy, an agency that had been established by the Anti-Drug Abuse Act of 1988. Like Bennett, Bush favored an escalation of the federal role in the "war on drugs", including the deployment of the National Guard to aid local law enforcement.

=== Pardons ===
As other presidents have done, Bush issued a series of pardons during his last days in office. In total, Bush pardoned fewer than 100 people. On December 24, 1992, he granted executive clemency to six former government employees implicated in the Iran–Contra affair of the late 1980s, most prominently former secretary of defense Caspar Weinberger. Bush described Weinberger, who was scheduled to stand trial on January 5, 1993, for criminal charges related to Iran-Contra, as a "true American patriot". In addition to Weinberger, Bush pardoned Duane R. Clarridge, Clair E. George, Robert C. McFarlane, Elliott Abrams, and Alan Fiers, all of whom had been indicted and/or convicted of criminal charges by an independent counsel headed by Lawrence Walsh. The pardons effectively brought an end to Walsh's investigation of the Iran-Contra scandal.

== Elections during the Bush presidency ==
Congressional party leaders
		Senate leaders		House leaders	
Congress	Year	Majority	Minority	Speaker	Minority
101st	1989	Mitchell	Dole	Wright	Michel
101st	1989–1990	Mitchell	Dole	Foley (Note: Jim Wright resigned as Speaker of the House on June 6, 1989. Tom Foley was elected to replace Wright as Speaker of the House on June 6, 1989.)	Michel
102nd	1991–1992	Mitchell	Dole	Foley	Michel
103rd (Note: 17 days of the 101st Congress (January 3, 1989 – January 19, 1989) took place under President Reagan, and 17 days of the 103rd Congress (January 3, 1993 – January 19, 1993) took place during Bush's single term.)	1993	Mitchell	Dole	Foley	Michel

Republican seats in Congress
Congress	Senate	House
101st	45	175
102nd	44	167
103rd	43	176

=== 1990 mid-term elections ===
In the 1990 mid-term elections, Democrats retained the majorities of the House and the Senate.

=== 1992 re-election campaign ===
Democrat Bill Clinton defeated President Bush in the 1992 presidential election

Bush announced his reelection bid in early 1992; with a coalition victory in the Persian Gulf War and high approval ratings, Bush's reelection initially looked likely. Many pundits believed that Democrats were unlikely even to improve on Dukakis's 1988 showing. As a result, many leading Democrats, including Mario Cuomo, Dick Gephardt, and Al Gore, declined to seek their party's presidential nomination. However, Bush's tax increase had angered many conservatives, and he faced a challenge from the right in the 1992 Republican primaries. Conservative political columnist Pat Buchanan rallied the party's right-wing with attacks on Bush's flip-flop on taxes and his support for the Civil Rights Act of 1991. Buchanan shocked observers by finishing a strong second in the New Hampshire Republican presidential primary. Bush fended off Buchanan's challenge and won his party's nomination at the 1992 Republican National Convention, but the convention adopted a socially conservative platform strongly influenced by the Christian right.

As the economy grew worse and Bush's approval ratings declined, several Democrats decided to enter the 1992 Democratic primaries. Former senator Paul Tsongas of Massachusetts won the New Hampshire primary, but Democratic governor Bill Clinton of Arkansas emerged as the Democratic front-runner. A moderate who was affiliated with the Democratic Leadership Council (DLC), Clinton favored welfare reform, deficit reduction, and a tax cut for the middle class. Clinton withstood attacks on his personal conduct and defeated Tsongas, former California governor Jerry Brown, and other candidates to win the Democratic nomination. Clinton selected Senator Al Gore of Tennessee, a fellow Southerner and baby boomer, as his running mate. Polling taken shortly after the Democratic convention showed Clinton with a twenty-point lead. Clinton focused his campaign on the economy, attacking the policies of Reagan and Bush.

In early 1992, the race took an unexpected twist when Texas billionaire Ross Perot launched a third party bid, claiming that neither Republicans nor Democrats could eliminate the deficit and make government more efficient. His message appealed to voters across the political spectrum disappointed with both parties' perceived fiscal irresponsibility. Perot also attacked NAFTA, which he claimed would lead to major job losses. Perot dropped out of the race in July 1992, but rejoined the race in early October.

==== Lost re-election and transition period ====
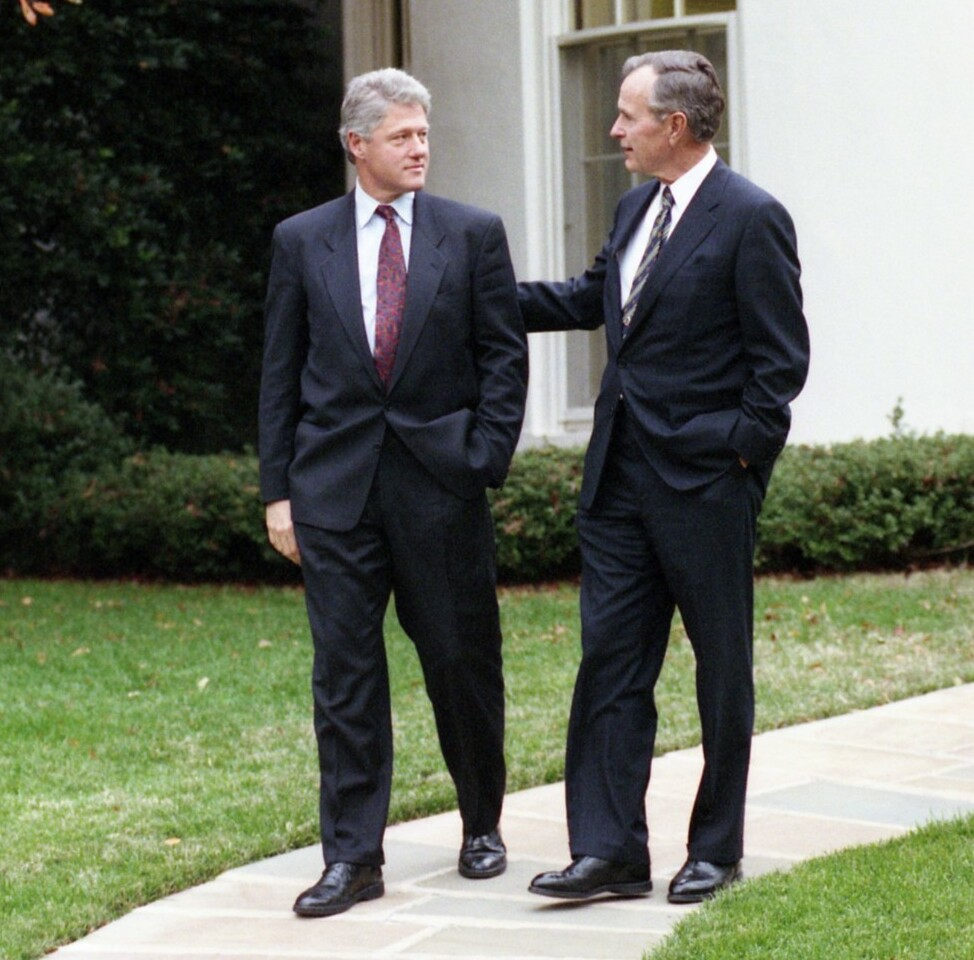
Outgoing President George H. W. Bush and President-elect Bill Clinton on November 18, 1992

Clinton won the election, taking 43 percent of the popular vote and 370 electoral votes, while Bush won 37.5 percent of the popular vote and 168 electoral votes. Perot won 19% of the popular vote, one of the highest totals for a third-party candidate in U.S. history, drawing equally from both major candidates, according to exit polls. Clinton performed well in the Northeast, the Midwest, and the West Coast, while also waging the strongest Democratic campaign in the South since the 1976 election. Bush won a majority of the Southern states and also carried most of the Mountain States and the Plains states. In the concurrent congressional elections, Democrats retained control of both the House of Representatives and the Senate.

Several factors were important in Bush's defeat. The ailing economy which arose from recession may have been the main factor in Bush's loss, as 7 in 10 voters said on election day that the economy was either "not so good" or "poor". In June 1992, the unemployment rate stood at 7.8%, which was the highest it had been since 1984. Bush's re-election campaign, which could no longer rely on Lee Atwater due to Atwater's incapacity in 1990 and death in 1991, was far less effective than the 1988 Bush campaign. The president was also damaged by his alienation of many conservatives in his party.

According to Seymour Martin Lipset, the 1992 election had several unique characteristics. Voters felt that economic conditions were worse than they actually were, which harmed Bush. A rare event was a strong third-party candidate. Liberals launched a backlash against 12 years of a conservative White House. The chief factor was Clinton's uniting his party, and winning over a number of heterogeneous groups.

== Evaluation and legacy ==
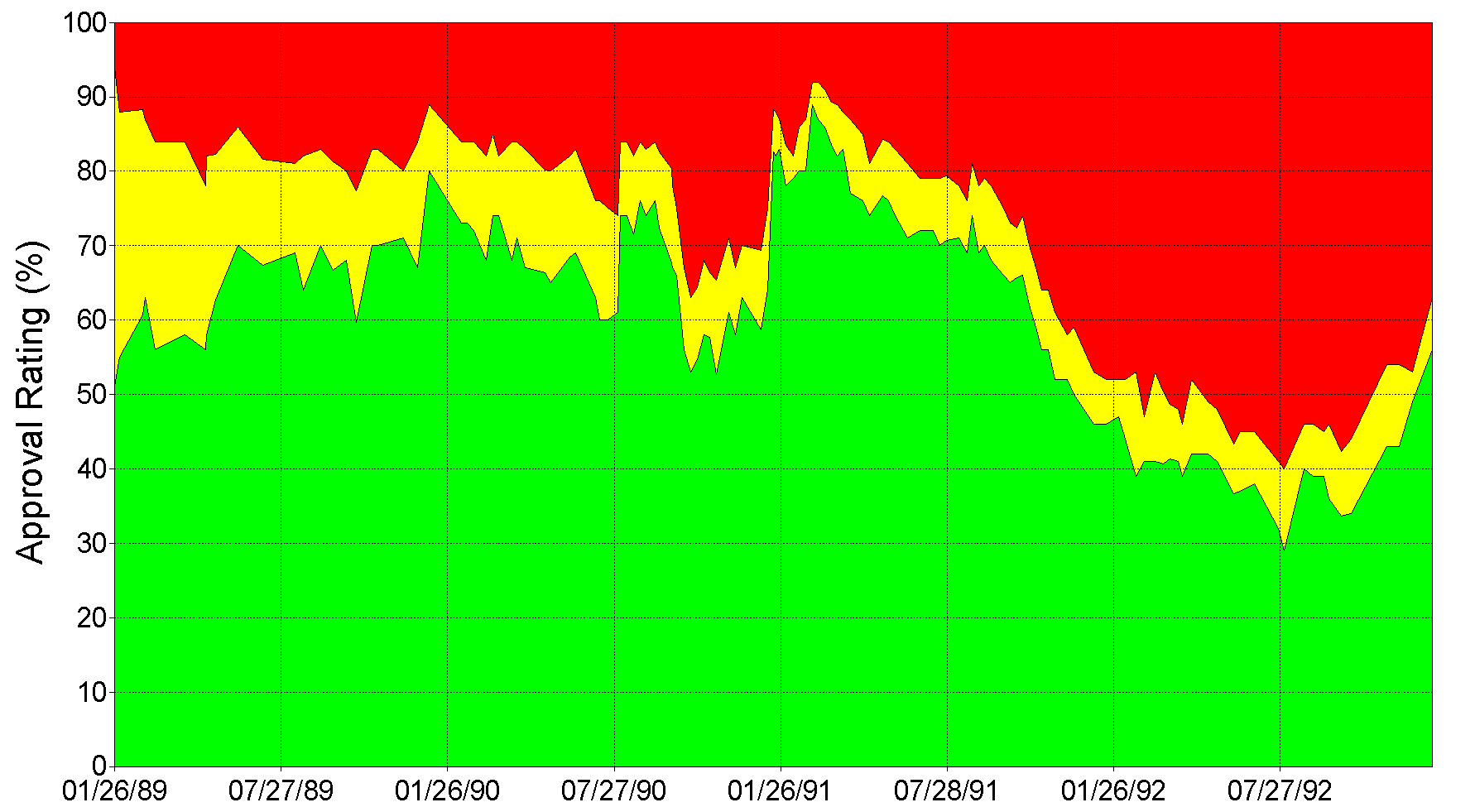
Graph of Bush's approval ratings in Gallup polls

President George H. W. Bush Medal of Merit from the Paul F. Kisak Presidential Collection.

At the elite level, a number of commentators and political experts deplored the state of American politics in 1991–1992, and reported the voters were angry. Many analysts blamed the poor quality of national election campaigns.

Bush was widely seen as a "pragmatic caretaker" president who lacked a unified and compelling long-term theme in his efforts. Indeed, Bush's sound bite where he refers to the issue of overarching purpose as "the vision thing" has become a metonym applied to other political figures accused of similar difficulties. Facing a Democratic Congress and a large budget deficit, Bush focused much of his attention on foreign affairs. Later, this would become a point of criticism for his presidency, with opponents such as Bill Clinton and Ross Perot claiming that he ignored domestic issues and exclusively solved foreign ones. His ability to gain broad international support for the Gulf War and the war's result were seen as both a diplomatic and military triumph, rousing bipartisan approval, though his decision to withdraw without removing Saddam Hussein left mixed feelings, and attention returned to the domestic front and a souring economy. Amid the early 1990s recession, his image shifted from "conquering hero" to "politician befuddled by economic matters".

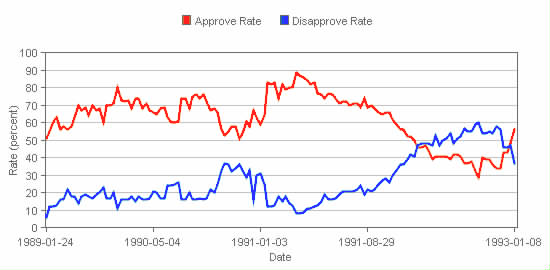
Bush's approval ratings (red) compared to his disapproval ratings (blue) for his four-year presidency.

Despite his defeat, Bush climbed back from low election day approval ratings to leave office in 1993 with a 56% job approval rating. Bush's oldest son, George W. Bush, served as the country's 43rd president from 2001 to 2009. The Bushes were the second father and son pair to serve as president, following John Adams and John Quincy Adams. By December 2008, 60% of Americans gave George H. W. Bush's presidency a positive rating. In the 2010s, Bush was fondly remembered for his willingness to compromise, which contrasted with the intensely partisan era that followed his presidency. Polls of historians and political scientists have generally ranked Bush as an average to above-average president. A 2018 poll of the American Political Science Association’s Presidents and Executive Politics section ranked Bush as the 17th best president. A 2017 C-SPAN poll of historians ranked Bush as the 20th best president.

Richard Rose described Bush as a "guardian" president, and many other historians and political scientists have similarly described Bush as a passive, hands-off president who was "largely content with things as they were". Historian John Robert Greene notes, however, that Bush's frequent threat of a veto allowed him to influence legislation. Bush is widely regarded as a realist in international relations; Scowcroft labeled Bush as a practitioner of "enlightened realism". Greene argues that the Bush administration's handling of international issues was characterized by a "flexible response to events" influenced by Nixon's realism and Reagan's idealism.

=== Evaluation of his foreign policy ===
According to Roger Harrison in reviewing Sparrow's biography of Scowcroft:

What the Bush administration achieved in its four years, as Sparrow reminds us, is perhaps without parallel in any similar period of our history: the peaceful demise of the Soviet Union and the emergence of independent states from what had been its empire, the reunification of Germany and its integration within NATO, and the creation of a broad coalition that expelled Iraqi forces from Kuwait and crippled Iraq as a disruptive force in the Middle East. None of this was preordained, and much might have gone wrong without the adept diplomacy and level-headed policy of President Bush and his aides.

David Rothkopf argues:

In the recent history of U.S. foreign policy, there has been no president, nor any president’s team, who, when confronted with profound international change and challenges, responded with such a thoughtful and well-managed foreign policy....[the Bush administration was] a bridge over one of the great fault lines of history [that] ushered in a ‘new world order’ it described with great skill and professionalism.”

Michael Beschloss and Strobe Talbott praise Bush's handling of the USSR, especially how he prodded Gorbachev in terms of releasing control over the satellites and permitting German unification—and especially a united Germany in NATO. However Bush had an exaggerated view of Gorbachev as the best leader of a new Russia, and missed the more important role of Boris Yeltsin as the true spokesman for public opinion in Russia in its disdain for Gorbachev and his unyielding devotion to Communism.

Andrew Bacevich judges the Bush administration was “morally obtuse” in the light of its “business-as-usual” attitude towards China after the massacre in Tiananmen Square and the uncritical support of Gorbachev as the Soviet Union disintegrated.

Summing up assessments of Bush's presidency, Stephen Knott writes:

George Herbert Walker Bush came into the presidency as one of the most qualified candidates to assume the office. He had a long career in both domestic politics and foreign affairs, knew the government bureaucracy, and had eight years of hands-on training as vice president. Still, if presidential success is determined by winning reelection, Bush was unsuccessful because he failed to convince the American public to give him another four years in office. Generally the Bush presidency is viewed as successful in foreign affairs but a disappointment in domestic affairs. In the minds of voters, his achievements in foreign policy were not enough to overshadow the economic recession, and in 1992, the American public voted for change.

In 1994, Bush became the third former president to receive the Sylvanus Thayer Award from the Association of Graduates of the United States Military Academy.

== See also ==
- George H.W. Bush Presidential Library and Museum
- List of people pardoned by George H. W. Bush

== Bibliography ==
- Barilleaux, Ryan J. Power and prudence : the presidency of George H.W. Bush (2004) online
- Congressional Quarterly. Congress and the Nation: Volume 8: 1989–1992 (CQ Press, 1993) online 1520pp
- David, Charles‐Philippe. "Who was the real George Bush? Foreign policy decision‐making under the Bush administration." Diplomacy and Statecraft 7.1 (1996): 197–220.
- Dobel, J. Patrick. "Prudence and presidential ethics: the decisions on Iraq of the two presidents Bush." Presidential Studies Quarterly 40.1 (2010): 57–75. online
- Duffy, Michael. Marching in place : the status quo presidency of George Bush (1992) online free to borrow
- Engel, Jeffrey A. "A Better World...but Don't Get Carried Away: The Foreign Policy of George HW Bush Twenty Years On." Diplomatic History 34.1 (2010): 25–46.
- Feldman, Leslie Dale, and Rosanna Perotti, eds. Honor and loyalty: inside the politics of the George HW Bush White House (Greenwood, 2002) * Graff, Henry F., ed. The Presidents: A Reference History (3rd ed. 2002)
- Greene, John Robert (2015). The Presidency of George Bush (2nd ed. UP of Kansas). online free to borrow, a major scholarly survey.
- Han, Lori Cox. A presidency upstaged: The public leadership of George HW Bush (Texas A&M University Press, 2011) excerpt.
- Henriksen, Thomas H. Cycles in US Foreign Policy since the Cold War (Palgrave Macmillan, Cham, 2017) pp. 29–85.
- Herring, George C. (2008). From Colony to Superpower; U.S. Foreign Relations Since 1776. Oxford UP. ISBN 978-0-19-507822-0.
- Holzer, Harold. The Presidents Vs. the Press: The Endless Battle Between the White House and the Media--from the Founding Fathers to Fake News (Dutton, 2020) pp. 325–330. online
- Levantrosser, William F., and Rosanna Perotti, eds. A Noble Calling: Character and the George HW Bush Presidency (Greenwood, 2004).
- Mann, James. Rise of the Vulcans: The History of Bush's War Cabinet. (2004) online
- Maynard, Christopher. Out of the shadow: George HW Bush and the end of the Cold War (Texas A&M University Press, 2008). excerpt
- Meacham, Jon (2015). Destiny and Power: The American Odyssey of George Herbert Walker Bush. New York: Random House. ISBN 978-1-4000-6765-7.
- Medhurst, Martin J., ed. The rhetorical presidency of George HW Bush (Texas A&M University Press, 2006) excerpt.
- Mervin, David. George Bush and the guardianship presidency (1996) online free to borrow
- Naftali, Timothy (2007). George H. W. Bush. Times Books. ISBN 978-0-8050-6966-2.
- Nelson, Michael, and Barbara A. Perry, eds. 41: Inside the presidency of George HW Bush (Cornell University Press, 2014). excerpt
- Patterson, James (2005). Restless Giant: The United States from Watergate to Bush v. Gore. Oxford University Press. ISBN 978-0195122169.
- Perotti, Rosanna, ed. Principle Over Politics? The Domestic Policy of the George HW Bush Presidency (ABC-CLIO, 2004); essays by experts. excerpt
- Podhoretz, John (1993). Hell of a Ride: Backstage at the White House Follies, 1989–1993. New York: Simon & Schuster. ISBN 0-671-79648-8.
- Rossinow, Douglas C. (2015). The Reagan Era: A History of the 1980s. Columbia University Press. ISBN 9780231538657.
- Smith, Jean Edward (1992). George Bush's War. New York: Henry Holt & Company. ISBN 0-8050-1388-1.
- Sununu, John H. (2015). The Quiet Man: The Indispensable Presidency of George H. W. Bush. Broadside Books. ISBN 978-0-06-238428-7.
- Troy, Gil. "Stumping in the bookstores: A literary history of the 1992 presidential campaign." Presidential Studies Quarterly (1995): 697–710. online
- Vanhoonacker, Sophie. The Bush administration (1989–1993) and the development of a European security identity (Routledge, 2017).
- Waterman, Richard W. (1996). "Storm Clouds on the Political Horizon: George Bush at the Dawn of the 1992 Presidential Election". Presidential Studies Quarterly. 26 (2): 337–349. JSTOR 27551581.
- Wicker, Tom (2004). George Herbert Walker Bush. Lipper/Viking. ISBN 0670033030.
- Wilentz, Sean (2008). The Age of Reagan. HarperCollins. ISBN 978-0-06-074480-9.

=== Primary sources ===
- Baker, James A. The Politics of Diplomacy: Revolution, War, and Peace, 1989-1992. (1995) online
- Bush, George H. W., and Brent Scowcroft. A World Transformed (2011). online
- Gates, Robert M. From the Shadows: The Ultimate Insider's Story of Five Presidents (1996), director of CIA 1991–1993. online
- Powell, Colin L. and Joseph Persico. My American Journey: An Autobiography (2003) online
- Public papers of the Presidents of the United States: George Bush 1989 (1989) online
