= Trust (advertisement) =

1992 US presidential election campaign political commercial

- Client: George H.W. Bush 1992 presidential campaign
- Language: English
- Running time: 30 seconds
- Release date: March 12, 1992
- Country: United States

Trust was a political commercial aired preceding the 1992 United States presidential election, during the Republican presidential primaries, in support of the re-election campaign of President George H. W. Bush. The 30-second TV spot attacked conservative columnist Pat Buchanan, who was challenging Bush for the Republican nomination, for owning a foreign-produced Mercedes-Benz and for criticizing his American-made vehicles while speaking in favor of American manufacturing.

The ad was aired in Michigan, targeting autoworkers in the state who were worried about outsourcing ahead of the state's March 17 presidential primary. Its release coincided with the release of a Buchanan ad criticizing Bush for his advisors' ties to Japanese automakers. Buchanan ultimately lost the Michigan primary by a large margin, receiving just under 25 percent of the vote to Bush's 67 percent. Commentators blamed Buchanan's margin of loss in part on his social conservatism. With Bush's victory, his renomination by the Republican Party was all but ensured.

== Background ==
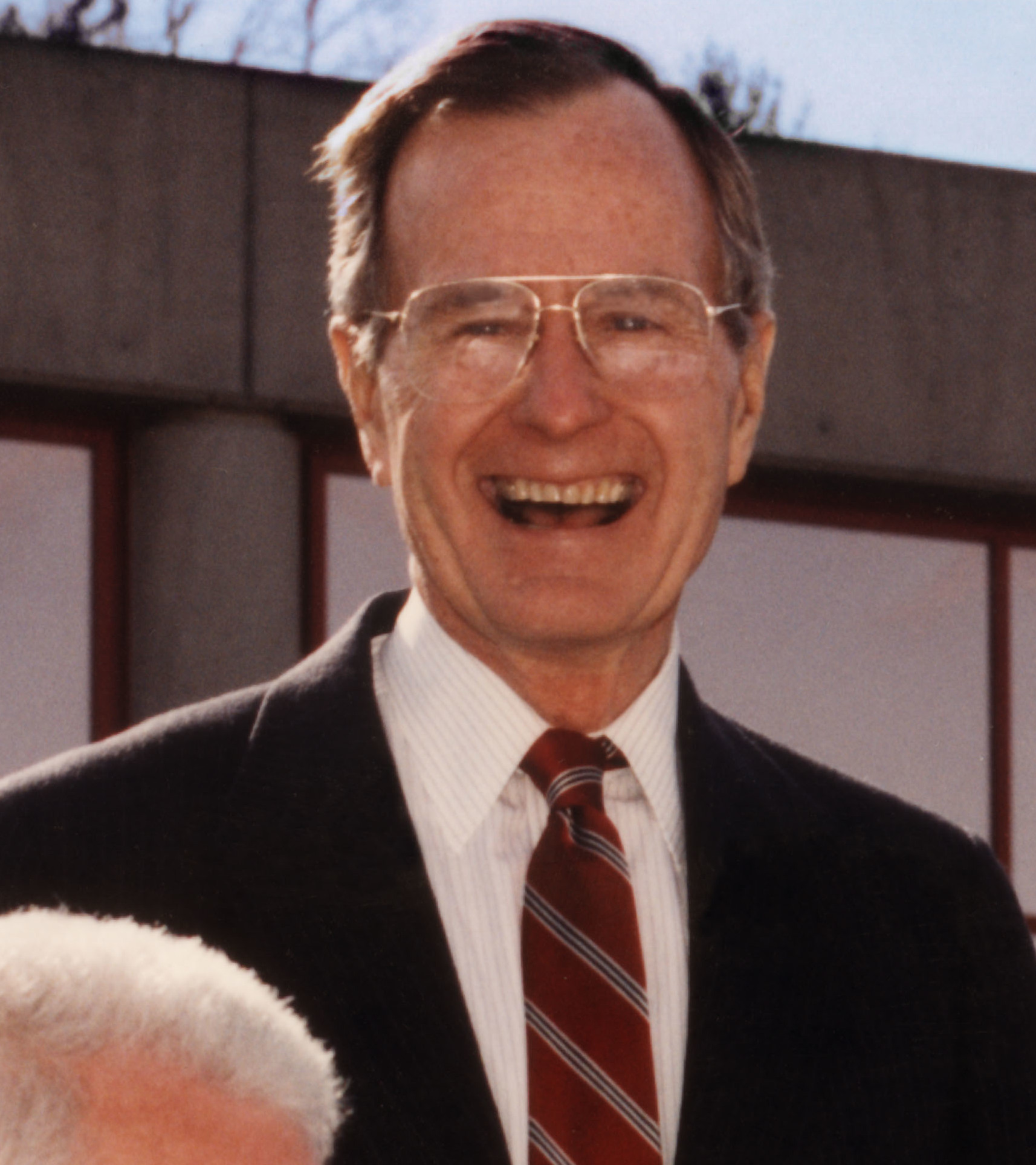
During the 1992 presidential election campaign, incumbent president George H.W. Bush (above) sought the Republican nomination for re-election.

During the 1992 presidential election cycle, incumbent President George H.W. Bush faced a primary challenge from conservative commentator Pat Buchanan; the primary campaign was characterized as negative and "ferocious". Early on in the campaign, Buchanan's campaign ads attacked Bush for his broken "Read my lips: no new taxes" promise from the 1988 election; following his unexpectedly strong showing in the New Hampshire primary, he also began targeting Bush on social issues, billing himself as the candidate of social conservatives in campaign ads aired before the Georgia primary. In February 1992, Bush aired a commercial in which a former Marine officer criticized Buchanan as an isolationist; in response, Buchanan drew attention to the trade deficit and intoned in a radio spot that Bush was a "trade wimp". When the campaign progressed to the Michigan primary, Buchanan opted to create a commercial that drew attention to outsourcing in the context of the state's struggling auto industry and high unemployment rate. Bush opted to do the same, and for his ad enlisted Alex Castellanos, Don Sipple, and Mike Murphy.

== Summary ==
The 30-second spot opens with a narrator stating, "The issue: Michigan jobs. Pat Buchanan tells us America first". The ad goes on to criticize Buchanan for owning a German-made Mercedes-Benz, and quotes the candidate as calling the American-made Cadillacs which he had driven "lemons" by comparison. The ad concludes with the statement that "It’s America first in his political speeches but a foreign-made car in his driveway. Michigan has too much at stake to trust Pat Buchanan". The ad's imagery includes a photo of the candidate beside a newspaper with the headline "Buchanan says put America first", a photo of a closed Detroit auto plant, and an image in which Buchanan's face is superimposed onto a Mercedes logo.

== Release ==
The ad premiered in Michigan on the evening of Thursday, March 12. Its release coincided with that of a Buchanan ad critical of Bush, seeking to tie his administration to foreign car manufacturers; it contended that Charles Black and James Lake, two of Bush's senior advisors, "work for foreign auto concerns", and concluded "No wonder Michigan has lost 73,000 jobs".

== Reaction ==
=== Interpretation ===
It was noted that the Bush campaign appeared to have the goal of angering autoworkers in Michigan, where the ad aired, with Buchanan's comments on his American-made Cadillacs, and more generally to paint Buchanan as a hypocrite for supporting an "America first" trade policy while owning a foreign car. The issue of outsourcing was regarded as particularly salient in the state, given that it had an unemployment rate of over nine percent. In The Crusader: The Life and Tumultuous Times of Pat Buchanan, biographer Timothy Stanley noted that in the state, "owning a foreign car was tantamount to treason". Fact-checking the commercial, the Associated Press confirmed that Buchanan had, earlier in the campaign, admitted to having bought a Mercedes and called his Cadillacs "lemons". The New York Times suggested that the ad was also intended to counter criticism of Bush's recent visit to Japan.

=== Candidate response ===
When questioned about the ad's claims, Buchanan responded that the Mercedes belonged to his wife, not to him, and that they both drove it. He told local reporters that he had bought the car for his wife three years prior, on her request. He elaborated that he had purchased the vehicle in part because it had two front-seat airbags and his wife was worried about his safety driving home from his appearances on Crossfire. During a campaign stop in Holland, Michigan, Buchanan made a joke about the issue, when he introduced his wife quipping that she "has a used Mercedes to sell if anyone is interested".

In statements to the press, Bush's campaign emphasized that his vehicles were American-made: in a statement to the New York Times, Barbara Bush's press secretary said that both of the couple's trucks at their Maine estate were made in America. The paper further observed that the president's limousine, helicopter, and jet were all made in the United States.

=== Primary result ===
Buchanan ultimately lost in a landslide to Bush in the state primary, receiving 24.96 percent of the vote (112,122 ballots) to Bush's 67.23 percent (301,948 ballots). The result was attributed to many factors apart from Bush's attack ad, among them Buchanan's underperformance among union workers, owing in part to the unions' resistance to his socially conservative positions. With the result, Bush was regarded as having clinched re-nomination; in the March 20, 1992, issue of the Michigan Election Watch newsletter, Craig Ruff concluded that Bush's margin of victory "effectively knocks Buchanan out of the race" and that from then on, Buchanan, like Democratic presidential candidate Jerry Brown, could "assume only Quixotic roles" in their respective primaries.
