= Robert H. Michel =

American politician (1923–2017)

Bob Michel
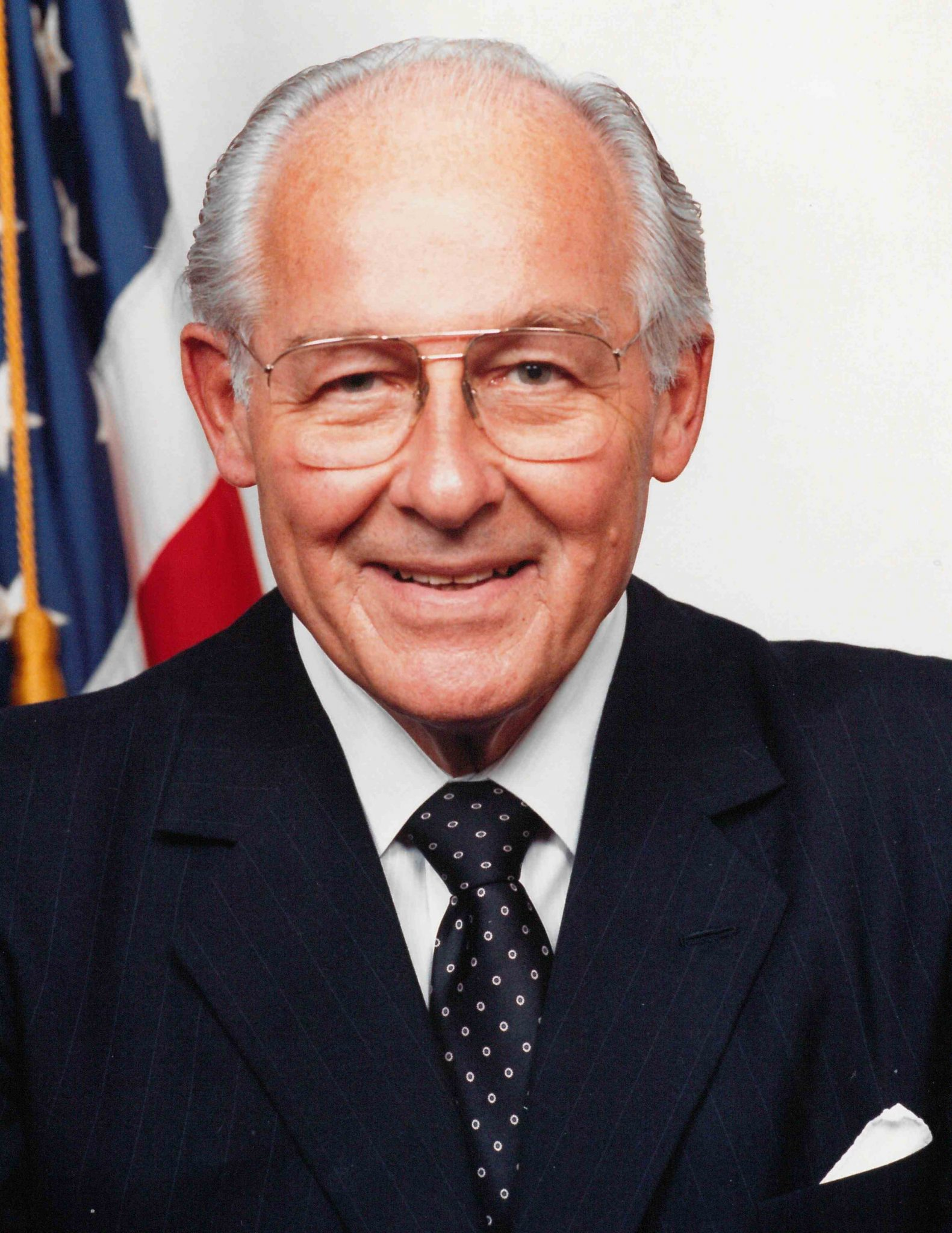
- Official portrait, 1993

House Minority Leader
- In office January 3, 1981 – January 3, 1995
- Whip: Trent Lott; Dick Cheney; Newt Gingrich
- Preceded by: John Rhodes
- Succeeded by: Dick Gephardt

Leader of the House Republican Conference
- In office January 3, 1981 – January 3, 1995
- Preceded by: John Rhodes
- Succeeded by: Newt Gingrich

House Minority Whip
- In office January 3, 1975 – January 3, 1981
- Leader: John Rhodes
- Preceded by: Leslie C. Arends
- Succeeded by: Trent Lott

Chair of the National Republican Congressional Committee
- In office January 3, 1973 – January 3, 1975
- Leader: Gerald Ford; John Rhodes
- Preceded by: Bob Wilson
- Succeeded by: Guy Vander Jagt

Member of the U.S. House of Representatives from Illinois's 18th district
- In office January 3, 1957 – January 3, 1995
- Preceded by: Harold H. Velde
- Succeeded by: Ray LaHood

Personal details
- Born: Robert Henry Michel; March 2, 1923 Peoria, Illinois, U.S.
- Died: February 17, 2017 (aged 93) Arlington, Virginia, U.S.
- Party: Republican
- Spouse: Corinne Woodruff (m. 1948; died 2003)
- Children: 4
- Education: Bradley University (BS)

Military service
- Allegiance: United States
- Branch/service: United States Army
- Years of service: 1943–1946
- Rank: Private
- Unit: 39th Infantry Regiment
- Battles/wars: World War II
- Awards: Bronze Star Medal (2); Purple Heart with battle stars (4)
- Robert H. Michel's voice Michel discusses the need to reform the House of Representatives; Recorded June 18, 1992

Robert Henry Michel (/maɪkɛl/; March 2, 1923 – February 17, 2017) was an American Republican Party politician who was a member of the United States House of Representatives for 38 years. He represented central Illinois's 18th congressional district and was the GOP leader in the House, serving as House Minority Leader during his last 14 years in Congress, 1981 to 1995.

Michel's tenure as House leader occurred during the latter part of the decades-long era in which the Democratic Party held a majority in the House of Representatives. Well known for his bipartisanship and friendship with prominent Democrats in the House, Michel was eventually eclipsed by Newt Gingrich and other younger Republicans who favored a more confrontational style. Michel did not seek re-election in the 1994 midterm elections, where Gingrich led the Republican Revolution that resulted in the GOP taking control of the House for the first time in 40 years.

== Early life ==
Michel was born and raised in Peoria, Illinois, the son of Anna (née Baer) and Charles Jean Michel. His father was an immigrant from Alsace and his mother was the daughter of German immigrants. He attended Peoria High School. He received a Bachelor of Science degree from Bradley University.

== Military service ==
When the U.S. entered the Second World War, Michel joined the United States Army and served with the 39th Infantry Regiment as an infantryman in England, France, Belgium, and Germany from February 10, 1943, to January 26, 1946, while also participating in the Invasion of Normandy in 1944. He was wounded by machine gun fire and awarded two Bronze Stars, the Purple Heart, and four battle stars.

== Education and early career ==
After the war ended, Michel attended Bradley University in Peoria, graduating in 1948. From 1949 to 1956, he worked as an administrative assistant to U.S. Representative Harold Velde.

== Electoral career ==
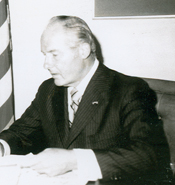
Michel as House Minority Leader

Although Michel was never part of the majority party, during his 38 years in the House, he was noted for his bipartisanship in striking bargains. Michel was well respected across the aisle and was good friends with Democrats, such as Speaker Thomas "Tip" O'Neill and Ways and Means Chairman Dan Rostenkowski.

Michel was elected as a Republican to the U.S. House of Representatives in 1956 and served until his retirement on January 3, 1995. He served as Minority Whip from 94th Congress through the 96th Congress. Michel served from 1959 to 1980 as a member of the House Appropriations Committee, including 12 years as the ranking Republican on the Labor, Health, Education, and Welfare Subcommittee. Later, he served as House Minority Leader from the 97th Congress through the 103rd Congress. Michel voted in favor of the Civil Rights Acts of 1957, 1960, 1964, and 1968, as well as the 24th Amendment to the U.S. Constitution. Michel voted in favor of the House amendment to the Voting Rights Act of 1965 on July 9, 1965, but voted against the joint conference committee report on August 3, 1965.

Michel's most difficult re-election was probably during the 1982 midterms, when he was in a tight race due to dissatisfaction over U.S. President Ronald Reagan's economic policies and the early 1980s recession. Reagan traveled to Peoria to campaign for him.

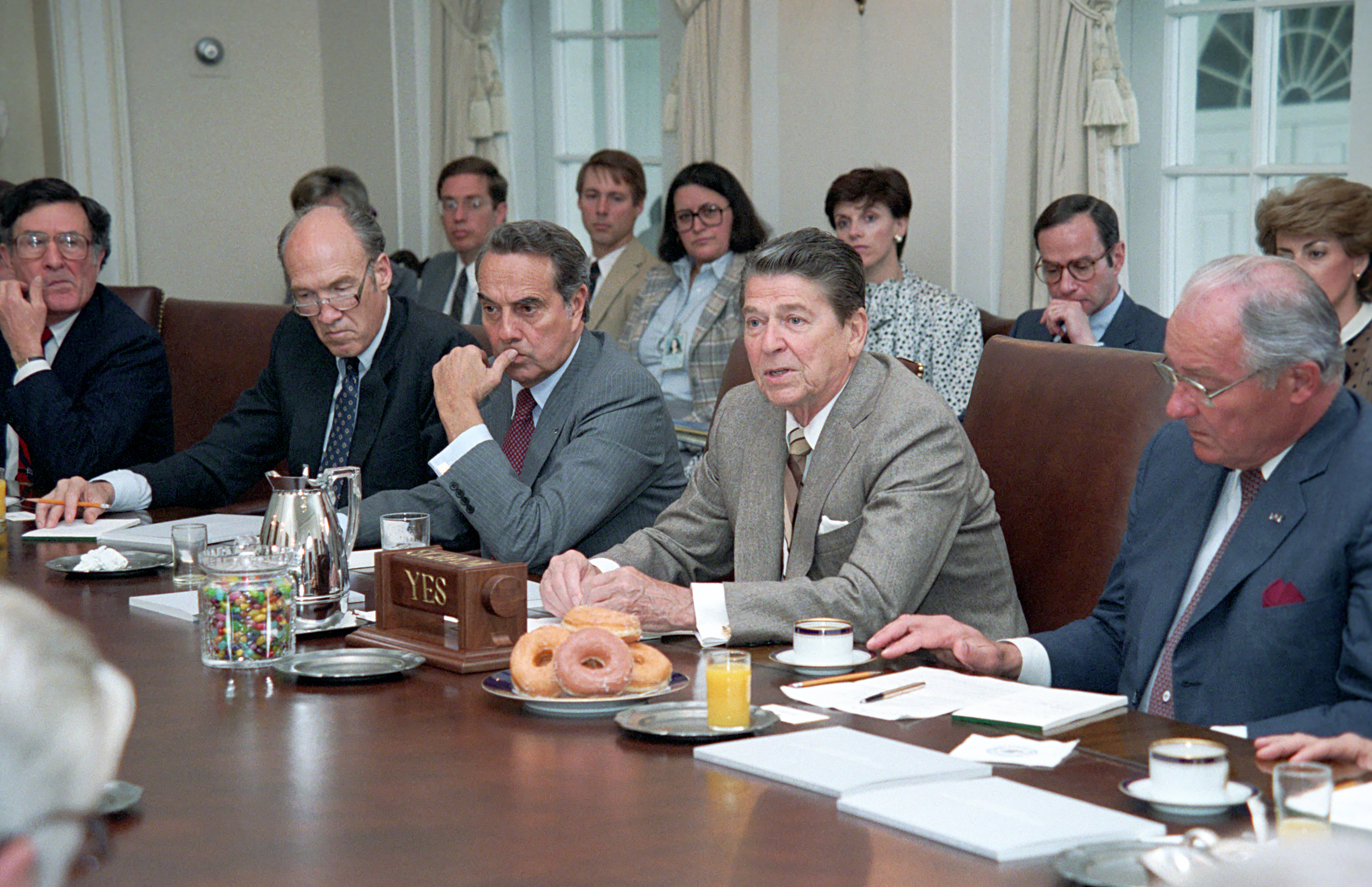
President Ronald Reagan meets with Michel, Bob Dole and Alan Simpson in the cabinet room in 1985

Michel voted in favor the bill establishing Martin Luther King Jr. Day as a federal holiday in August 1983. In March 1988, Michel voted against the Civil Rights Restoration Act of 1987 (as well as to uphold President Reagan's veto). Michel stirred a controversy in 1988 when he recalled enjoying and participating in blackface minstrel shows as a young man, and said he missed the shows. He also compared the removal of racially offensive words in songs such as "Ol' Man River" to the Soviet rewriting of history. He later apologized, explaining that he was attempting to understand and accept changes in U.S. culture.

In the early 1990s, Newt Gingrich and other young, aggressive conservative congressmen criticized Michel for being too easy-going and not fighting hard enough for Republican goals in the House. Supporters said Michel's practice of socializing with Democrats over a game of golf or cards resulted in deals that moved bills through the legislative process. It was also noted that Michel's voting record was nearly as conservative as Gingrich's.

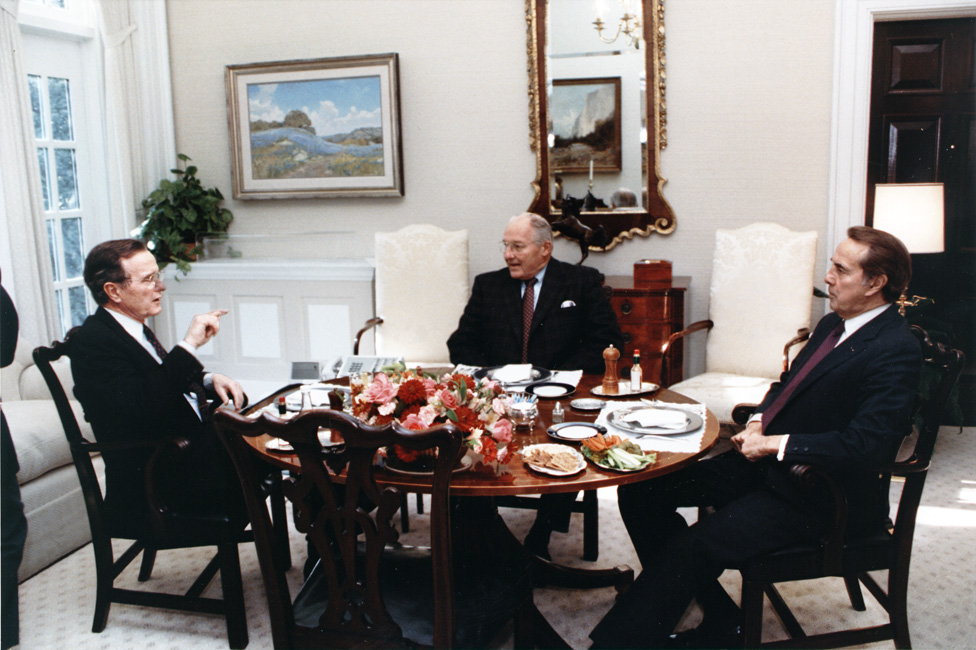
President George H. W. Bush having lunch at the White House with Michel and Bob Dole in 1991

During negotiations with the Democrats who held majorities in the House and Senate, President George H. W. Bush reached a deficit reduction package that contained tax increases despite his campaign promise of "read my lips: no new taxes." Gingrich led a revolt that defeated the initial appropriations package and led to the 1990 United States federal government shutdown. The deal was supported by the President and Congressional leaders from both parties after long negotiations, but Gingrich walked out during a televised event in the White House Rose Garden. Michel characterized Gingrich's revolt as "a thousand points of spite".

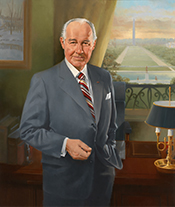
Michel's official portrait, 1992

In February 1993, Michel gave the rebuttal to President Bill Clinton's address to a joint session of Congress, criticizing the economic policies of the newly inaugurated president. "The Clinton spin doctors have even given us a new political vocabulary, if you will – investment now means big government spending your tax dollars. Change now means reviving old, discredited big government tax-and-spend schemes. Patriotism now means agreeing with the Clinton program. The powerful evocative word, sacrifice, has been reduced to the level of a bumper sticker slogan", he said. He was later criticized for obstructing Clinton's economic stimulus plan.

As a result of Gingrich's rising prominence which gradually attracted support from the caucus, Michel decided not to seek re-election in the 1994 mid-term elections. Had Michel run in the 1994 elections and won, he would have served in a Republican-controlled House for the first time in his entire Congressional career. However, the caucus would have likely favored Gingrich over Michel as Speaker of the House, due to Gingrich's central role in the Republican Revolution. In announcing his retirement, Michel complained that some of his fellow congressmen were more interested in picking fights than in passing laws. Gingrich had a confrontational style, which contrasted sharply with Michel's bipartisanship, but Republicans retained the majority during his term. Gingrich's successor as Speaker, Dennis Hastert, stated his desire to return to Michel's style.

Michel was succeeded in Congress by his longtime chief of staff, Ray LaHood. Several years after Michel's retirement, LaHood praised his former boss. Michel "knew warfare first hand", LaHood said. "That is the reason he never used the macho phrases like 'warfare' and 'take no prisoners' when discussing politics with his staff. To Bob, the harsh, personal rhetoric of ideological warfare had no place in his office, no place in the House, and no place in American politics."

== Namesakes and honors ==
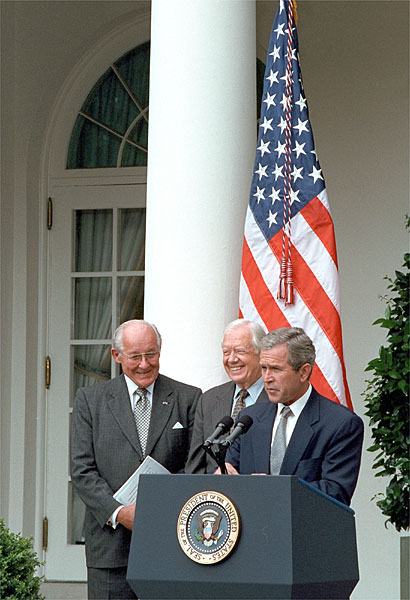
President George W. Bush, former President Jimmy Carter and House Minority Leader Bob Michel hold a press conference addressing election reform principles in the Rose Garden July 31, 2001

On January 18, 1989, outgoing president Ronald Reagan conferred upon him the Presidential Citizens Medal, the second highest civilian award given, making him the 7th recipient of the honor. On August 8, 1994, he was awarded the Presidential Medal of Freedom, the highest civilian award in the United States, by President Bill Clinton. He was one of the recipients of the first Congressional Distinguished Service Award in 2000, along with John Rhodes, Louis Stokes, and Don Edwards. This honor was created by then-Speaker Dennis Hastert and then-Minority Leader Dick Gephardt. In 2010, he was given the Schachman Award by the American Society for Biochemistry and Molecular Biology. The Society commended him for his post-congressional work in increasing public and congressional support for the National Institutes of Health which contributed to the doubling of the NIH's budget.

During the 1960s Michel was a frequent winning pitcher in the annual Democrats vs. Republicans baseball game, and in 1993, the Capitol Hill publication Roll Call, named him to its Baseball Hall of Fame.

In 1994, Michel received the U.S. Senator John Heinz Award for Greatest Public Service by an Elected or Appointed Official, an award given out annually by Jefferson Awards.

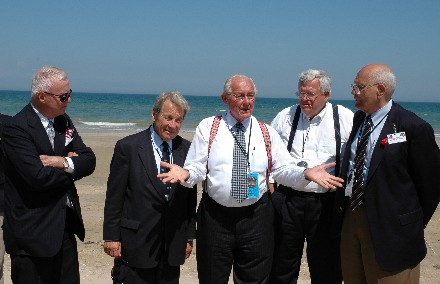
Michel and other members of Congress at Utah Beach in 2004

The Bob Michel Bridge, carrying Illinois Route 40 across the Illinois River at Peoria, is named after Robert H. Michel as is the Robert H. Michel Student Center at Bradley University. In the United States Capitol, the second-floor suite of offices occupied by the Speaker were designated the Robert H. Michel Rooms by the House in 1995. At the Capitol Hill Club located adjacent to the Republican National Committee, the cloak room is named for Bob Michel. In Peoria, Illinois, the VA Clinic is named the Bob Michel Community Based Outpatient Clinic. The Robert H. Michel Lifetime Achievement Award is presented by the Creve Coeur Club of Peoria each year at the club's Washington Day Banquet to recognize community leadership.

Robert H. Michel was inducted as a Laureate of The Lincoln Academy of Illinois and awarded the Order of Lincoln (the State's highest honor) by the Governor of Illinois in 1997 in the area of Government.

== Personal life and death ==
Michel was married to Corinne Woodruff (Michel) from 1948 until her death in 2003. The couple had four children, Scott, Bruce, Robin, and Laurie.

In 1978, he required hospital treatment after he was robbed and beaten by youths outside his Washington, D.C. home. One perpetrator was caught and convicted in juvenile court of assault on a member of Congress and assault with intent to rob.

Michel died on February 17, 2017, at the age of 93, from pneumonia in Arlington, Virginia.

U.S. House of Representatives
Preceded by Harold H. Velde	Member of the U.S. House of Representatives from Illinois's 18th congressional district 1957–1995	Succeeded by Ray LaHood
Preceded by Leslie C. Arends	House Minority Whip; 1975–1981	Succeeded by Trent Lott
Preceded by John Rhodes	House Minority Leader; 1981–1995	Succeeded by Dick Gephardt
Party political offices
Preceded by Bob Wilson	Chair of the National Republican Congressional Committee; 1973–1975	Succeeded by Guy Vander Jagt
Preceded by Leslie C. Arends	House Republican Deputy Leader; 1975–1981	Succeeded by Trent Lott
Preceded by John Rhodes	House Republican Leader; 1981–1995	Succeeded by Newt Gingrich
Preceded by Tom Foley	Response to the State of the Union address 1993	Succeeded by Bob Dole
