= 1990 United States federal government shutdown =

President George H. W. Bush negotiated a deficit reduction plan with Congressional leaders that included tax increases, despite his campaign pledge of "read my lips: no new taxes".

The United States federal government shut down from Saturday, October 6, until Monday, October 8, 1990. It stemmed from the fact that a deficit reduction package negotiated by President George H. W. Bush contained tax increases, despite his campaign promise of "read my lips: no new taxes", leading to a revolt led by House Minority Whip Newt Gingrich that defeated the initial appropriations package. Because the shutdown occurred over a weekend, the effects of the shutdown were lessened, with the National Parks and the Smithsonian museums being the most visible closures. Around 2,800 workers were furloughed, with the government losing $2.57 million in lost revenue and back wages.

== Background ==
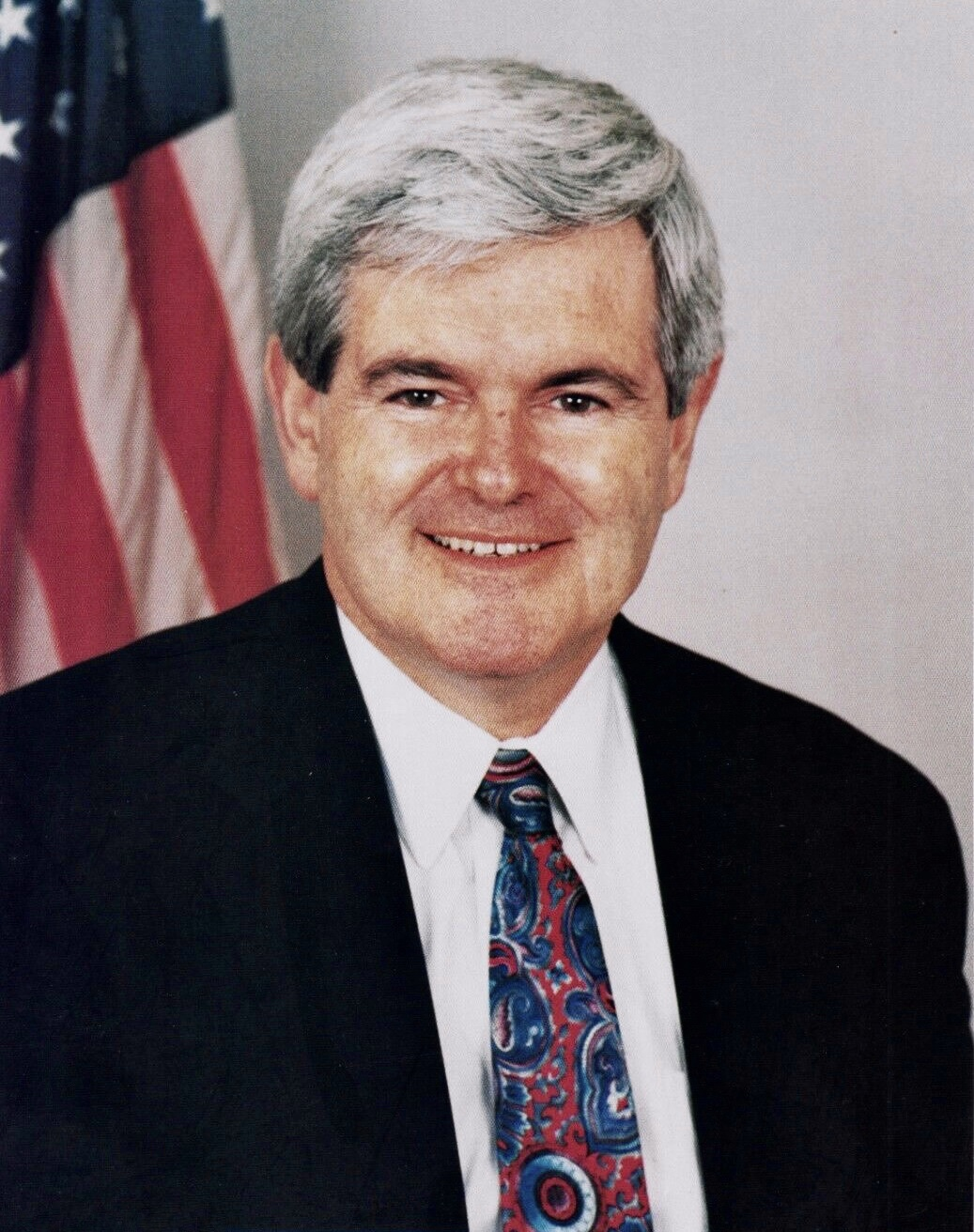
Newt Gingrich, then the House minority whip, led a revolt that led to the 1990 government shutdown. Because Gingrich opposed a deal supported by Congressional leaders from both parties, House Minority Leader Robert H. Michel characterized the revolt as "a thousand points of spite".

The shutdown stemmed from disagreements over the 1991 United States federal budget, whose fiscal year was to begin on October 1, 1990. Over the course of the prior year, President George H. W. Bush negotiated with Congressional leaders on a deficit reduction plan. At the time, Congress was controlled by Democrats. In June, Bush announced support for tax increases to break a stall in the negotiations, abandoning his campaign promise to not increase taxes. On September 30, the day before the beginning of fiscal year 1991, a deal was announced that would reduce the federal deficit by $500 billion over five years, including $134 billion in new taxes and making deep cuts to Medicare, with a temporary continuing resolution to fund the government through October 5.

However, the new taxes in the bill were opposed by conservative Republicans led by House Minority Whip Newt Gingrich. The fact that deal was supported by the President and Congressional leaders from both parties after long negotiations, with Gingrich walking out during a televised event in the White House Rose Garden, caused House Minority Leader Robert H. Michel to characterize the revolt as "a thousand points of spite". In addition, liberal Democrats opposed the bill's cuts to benefit programs. In response to the opposition, Bush made a nationally televised address warning of the negative effects of failing to reduce the deficit.

The deal was defeated in the House of Representatives in the early morning of October 5. Congress passed a second continuing resolution, but it was vetoed by Bush, causing a lapse in funding authority beginning on Saturday, October 6.

== Shutdown ==
Because the shutdown occurred during a weekend, the most visible effect was the closure of National Parks and the Smithsonian museums. Although none of the appropriations bills had been passed, not all government agencies actually shut down. Full shutdowns occurred in the Environmental Protection Agency, Department of Labor, Office of Personnel Management, and Department of Housing and Urban Development, and partial shutdowns occurred in the Library of Congress, Government Printing Office, and the Departments of Energy, Interior, and State. According to a study by the General Accounting Office, Interior (which includes the National Park Service) furloughed about 2,800 workers, the Library of Congress around 100, and the other agencies fewer than 10 each.

== Resolution and aftermath ==
In the morning of Tuesday, October 9, a revised deal was announced that would reduce the cuts to Medicare and would cut capital gains taxes in return for higher income taxes on the wealthy. A new continuing resolution lasting until October 19 was passed to allow for the bill to be finalized, allowing workers to return to work. The continuing resolution was passed by the Senate on a voice vote, and was passed by the House 362–3 at around 1:30 AM. The deal was driven by a perception that the public was blaming Congress for the shutdown rather than the President. Had the shutdown lasted into Tuesday, 2.4 million federal workers would have been furloughed.

The final deficit reduction deal, the Omnibus Budget Reconciliation Act of 1990, derived 28% of its savings from tax increases including an increase in the top income tax rate, but the gasoline tax was not raised. Trims to Medicare and discretionary spending were also included in the deal. Only 47 of the 176 House Republicans voted for the final package. The defeat of the initial bill was seen as giving Democrats more leverage in negotiating the final deal.

Bush initially announced that federal workers would not be paid for the furlough days, but Congress passed legislation granting them back pay due to the threat of lawsuits. The cost of the shutdown was $1.68 million, mainly as a result of lost revenue, not including back pay amounting to an additional $837,000.

The shutdown was later seen as the first high-visibility example of Gingrich's political power, showing his willingness to weaken the President and his own party leaders to try to stop them from making compromises with Democrats. The revolt was partially responsible for negative perceptions of the Bush presidency, as they could not use Reagan's strategy of claiming that Congressional Democrats were responsible for the tax increases. During his 1992 reelection campaign, Bush called the deal a mistake.

== See also ==
- Government shutdowns in the United States
