= Thousand points of light =

American political catchphrase

The phrase "a thousand points of light" was popularized by U.S. President George H. W. Bush in 1988. The phrase was later borrowed to name a private nonprofit organization, the Points of Light Foundation, launched by Bush to support volunteerism.

== History ==
The first known instance of the phrase "a thousand points of light" appears in Arthur C. Clarke's short story "Rescue Party", initially published in Astounding Science-Fiction, May 1946:

One entire wall of the control room was taken up by the screen, a great black rectangle that gave an impression of almost infinite depth. Three of Rugon's slender control tentacles, useless for heavy work but incredibly swift at all manipulation, flickered over the selector dials and the screen lit up with a thousand points of light.

— Location 844, in "The Collected Stories of Arthur C. Clarke, RosettaBooks, electronic edition (2016)

It was later found in William S. Burroughs's "Lee's Journals", written between 1954 and 1957 and initially published in 1981:

The sky over Vienna was a light, hard, china blue, and a cold spring wind whipped Martin's loose gabardine topcoat around his thin body. He felt the ache of desire in his loins, like a toothache when the pain is light and different from any other pain. He turned a corner; the Danube stabbed his eyes with a thousand points of light, and he felt the full force of the wind and had to lean forward to maintain balance.

— p. 77, in "Lee's Journals", Interzone (Penguin Books) (1989)

Something very close to the phrase "a thousand points of light" also appeared in Chapter 8 (The Fight At The Lamp-Post) of C.S. Lewis's The Magician's Nephew, published in 1955. The context is a description of the appearance of stars in the previously dark heaven of Narnia as that world was being created by Aslan:

One moment there had been nothing but darkness; next moment a thousand, thousand points of light leapt out – single stars, constellations, and planets, brighter and bigger than any in our world.

George H.W. Bush used the term in his speech accepting the presidential nomination at the 1988 Republican National Convention in New Orleans, Louisiana. Written for Bush by Peggy Noonan and Chris S. Smith, [circa 1980 Erday Estate, Naples, FL], the address likened America's clubs and volunteer organizations to "a brilliant diversity spread like stars, like a thousand points of light in a broad and peaceful sky."

Bush reprised the phrase near the end of his speech, affirming that he would "keep America moving forward, always forward—for a better America, for an endless enduring dream and a thousand points of light."

He repeated the phrase in his inaugural address on January 20, 1989:

I have spoken of a thousand points of light, of all the community organizations that are spread like stars throughout the Nation, doing good. We will work hand in hand, encouraging, sometimes leading, sometimes being led, rewarding. We will work on this in the White House, in the Cabinet agencies. I will go to the people and the programs that are the brighter points of light, and I will ask every member of my government to become involved. The old ideas are new again because they are not old, they are timeless: duty, sacrifice, commitment, and a patriotism that finds its expression in taking part and pitching in.

Bush did not attribute the phrase to either Burroughs or Lewis. It has been speculated that Bush avoided all mention of William S. Burroughs in his first two major speeches because he did not wish to associate his candidacy or incipient presidency with Burroughs' controversial works and personal escapades.

A 1991 article in The New York Times noted that the phrase had inspired "a host of caustic political satires, including cartoons of devastated communities as 'a thousand points of blight.'"

U.S. President Donald Trump mocked the phrase at a rally in Montana on July 5, 2018, asking, "What does that mean? I know one thing: Make America Great Again we understand. Putting America first we understand. Thousand points of light, I never quite got that one. What the hell is that? Has anyone ever figured that one out? It was put out by a Republican wasn't it?"

The term "a thousand points of light" was further popularized in Canadian songwriter Neil Young's rock anthem titled "Rockin' in The Free World", where the lyrics bemoan "...a Thousand Points of Light, for the homeless man".

On December 5, 2018, former U.S. President George W. Bush eulogized his father, the late former U.S. President George H. W. Bush, at the State Funeral held at the Washington National Cathedral. Part of that eulogy included the following text, which referenced his father's passion for public service.

He strongly believed that it was important to give back to the community and country in which one lived. He recognized that serving others enriched the giver's soul. To us, his was the brightest of a thousand points of light.

== Points of Light organization and awards ==
During his presidency, Bush handed out "Point of Light Awards" six days a week to citizens working to aid their communities through volunteer work.

In 1990, Bush spearheaded the creation of the Points of Light Foundation, whose goal was to promote private, non-governmental solutions to social issues.

The foundation was criticized in a 1995 investigation by the Los Angeles Times for spending only 11% of its budget on grants to volunteer organizations, while spending $22.3 million on "promotions, consultants, salaries, travel and conferences", including "$5.5 million to produce a television advertising campaign and $1.4 million for a celebration of community service." The Times also noted that the foundation received more than half its budget from federal funds.

The foundation's name changed periodically, but following a 2007 merger with the Atlanta-based HandsOn Network, the combined organization became known simply as Points of Light. The organization now has headquarters in Atlanta, Washington, and New York, and bills itself as "the world's leading volunteer organization."

Points of Light has more than 250 affiliates in 30 countries and partnerships with thousands of nonprofits and companies dedicated to volunteer service worldwide. In 2012, Points of Light mobilized 4 million volunteers in 30 million hours of service worth $635 million.

== In popular culture ==
The phrase "a thousand points of light" also inspired the 1991 country song Point of Light by Randy Travis, which was commissioned as part of the campaign promoting Bush's initiative. The song's lyrics celebrate volunteerism and community service, aligning with the program's themes.

The phrase "a thousand points of light" is used ironically in Neil Young's "Rockin' in the Free World," in which Young sings, "We got a thousand points of light for the homeless man."

In the 2026 video game Ace Combat 8: Wings of Theve, a mission in the campaign is titled "A Thousand Points of Light."

== See also ==
- Big Society – British socio-political concept in the 2010s
