= Read my lips: no new taxes =

Political catchphrase

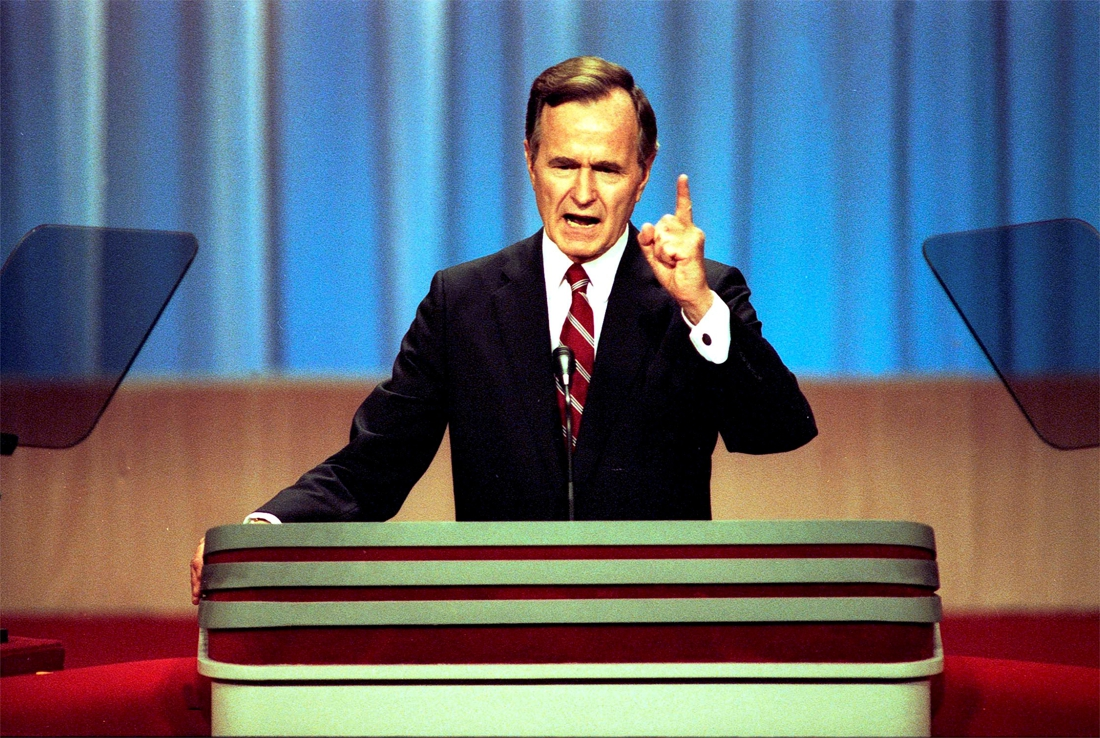
Then-Vice President Bush making his promise not to raise taxes during his acceptance speech at the 1988 Republican National Convention, August 18, 1988

"Read my lips: no new taxes."
Bush delivering the famous line at the 1988 convention

"Read my lips: no new taxes" is a phrase spoken by American presidential candidate George H. W. Bush at the 1988 Republican National Convention in New Orleans as he accepted the nomination on August 18. Written by speechwriter Peggy Noonan, the line was the most prominent sound bite from the speech. The pledge not to tax the American people further had been a consistent part of Bush's 1988 election platform, and its prominent inclusion in his speech cemented it in the public consciousness.

The line later hurt Bush politically. Although he did oppose the creation of new taxes as president, the Democratic-controlled Congress proposed increases in existing taxes as a way to reduce the national budget deficit. Bush negotiated with Congress for a budget that met his pledge, but was unable to make a deal with a Senate and House that was controlled by the opposing Democrats. Bush agreed to a compromise, which increased several existing taxes as part of a 1990 budget agreement.

In the 1992 presidential election campaign, Pat Buchanan repeatedly cited the pledge as an example of a broken promise in his unsuccessful challenge to Bush in the Republican primaries. In the general election, Democratic nominee Bill Clinton, running as a moderate, also cited the quotation and questioned Bush's trustworthiness. Bush lost his bid for re-election to Clinton, prompting many to suggest his failure to keep the "no new taxes" pledge as the primary reason for his defeat.

== Vice President Bush and taxes ==
Responding to Walter Mondale's admission in the 1984 United States presidential election debate that if he were elected taxes would likely be raised, Bush also implied that tax increases might be necessary in the next four years. Reagan asserted that he had no plans to raise taxes in his second term, and Bush quickly argued that he had been misunderstood. Bush's statements led some conservatives to begin doubting Bush's dedication to tax cuts.

As the competition to succeed Reagan began in 1986, it was clear that taxes would be a central issue. Grover Norquist, head of Americans for Tax Reform, had created a no-new-taxes pledge and was encouraging Republican candidates to sign it. A large number of congressional candidates signed, as did Bush's primary rivals Jack Kemp and Pete du Pont. Bush at first refused to sign the pledge, but in 1987 eventually acquiesced. (Note: Norquist still urges politicians to sign his tax pledge, and in subsequent Congresses majorities of Republicans and a smaller number of Democrats have signed the pledge.) The Bush campaign would later join other candidates in using the tax issue to attack Bob Dole, who had not been clear on the subject.

== Pledge ==
Bush had firmly secured the nomination by the time of the convention, but his advisers still worried about the lack of enthusiasm for Bush in the conservative wing of the Republican Party. Taxes were one issue that, in the words of Bush adviser James Pinkerton, "unified the right and didn't antagonize anybody else." Thus a firm no-new-tax pledge was included in Bush's acceptance speech at the New Orleans convention. The full section of the speech on tax policy was (emphasis added):

And I'm the one who will not raise taxes. My opponent now says he'll raise them as a last resort, or a third resort. But when a politician talks like that, you know that's one resort he'll be checking into. My opponent won't rule out raising taxes. But I will. And the Congress will push me to raise taxes and I'll say no. And they'll push, and I'll say no, and they'll push again, and I'll say, to them, "Read my lips: no new taxes."

The passage was written by leading speechwriter Peggy Noonan, with Jack Kemp having suggested the basic idea. Including the line caused some controversy, as some Bush advisers felt the language was too strong. The most prominent critic was economic adviser Richard Darman, who crossed the phrase out on an initial draft calling it "stupid and dangerous." Darman was one of the architects of Reagan's 1982 tax increase, and expected to have a major policy role in the Bush White House. He felt that such an absolute pledge would handcuff the administration.

Upon the advice of others however, especially Roger Ailes, the line remained in the speech. It was felt the pledge was needed to keep conservative support in a campaign that was trying to position itself as centrist. It was also hoped it would add an element of toughness to a candidate who was suffering from a perception of being weak and vacillating. At the time Bush was significantly behind Michael Dukakis in the polls, and Darman later argued that the campaign was far more concerned with winning than governing. The strategy appeared successful; after the convention, Bush began to take the lead over Dukakis. A Gallup poll taken the following week showed Bush leading by a 48 to 44 percent margin, with his favorability ratings increasing by nine points from pre-convention polls. California-based pollster Mervin Field declared that "I have never seen anything like this, this kind of swing in favorability ratings, ever since I have seen polls, going back to 1936." Another Gallup poll taken for Newsweek showed Bush with a 51% to 42% lead coming out of the convention.

== Taxes raised ==
Once in office, Bush found it challenging to keep his promise. The Bush campaign's figures had been based on the assumption that the high rates of economic growth in the late 1980s would continue throughout his time in office. Instead, a recession began. By 1990, rising budget deficits, fueled by a growth in mandatory spending and a declining economy, began to greatly increase the federal deficit. The Gramm–Rudman–Hollings Balanced Budget Act mandated that the deficit be reduced, or else mandatory cuts unpalatable to both Republicans and Democrats would be made. Reducing this deficit was a difficult task. New cuts of any substance would have to come either from government programs, such as Medicare or Social Security, or from defense.

The budget for the next fiscal year proved far more difficult. Bush initially presented Congress a proposed budget containing steep spending cuts and no new taxes, but congressional Democrats dismissed this out of hand. Negotiations began, but it was clear little progress could be made without a compromise on taxes. Richard Darman, who had been appointed head of the Office of Management and Budget, and White House Chief of Staff John H. Sununu both felt such a compromise was necessary. Other prominent Republicans had also come out in favor of a tax increase, including Gerald Ford, Paul O'Neill, and Lamar Alexander.

At the end of June, Bush released a statement stating that "it is clear to me that both the size of the deficit problem and the need for a package that can be enacted require all of the following: entitlement and mandatory program reform, tax revenue increases, growth incentives, discretionary spending reductions, orderly reductions in defense expenditures, and budget process reform." The key element was the reference to "tax revenue increases" now being up for negotiation. An immediate furor followed the release. The headline of the New York Post the next day read "Read my Lips: I Lied." Initially some argued that "tax revenue increases" did not necessarily mean tax increases. For example, he could mean that the government could work to increase taxable income. However, Bush soon confirmed that tax increases were on the table.

Some of the most enraged over the change in policy were other Republicans, including House Whip Newt Gingrich, the Senate leadership, and Vice President Dan Quayle. They felt Bush had destroyed the Republicans' most potent election plank for years to come. That the Republican leadership was not consulted before Bush made the deal also angered them. This perceived betrayal quickly led to a bitter feud within the Republican Party. When Sununu called Gingrich with the news, Gingrich hung up on him in anger. When Senator Trent Lott questioned the reversal, Sununu told the press that "Trent Lott has become an insignificant figure in this process." Republican National Committee co-chair Ed Rollins, who issued a memo instructing Republican congress members to distance themselves from the president if they wished to be re-elected, was fired from his position.

These events delivered a severe blow to Bush's popularity. From the historic high of 79% early in his term, Bush's approval rating had fallen to 56% by mid-October 1990.

On November 5, 1990, Bush signed the Omnibus Budget Reconciliation Act of 1990. Among other provisions, this raised multiple taxes.

The law increased the maximum individual income tax rate from 28 percent to 31 percent, and raised the individual alternative minimum tax rate from 21 percent to 24 percent. It also increased other taxes, including payroll and excise taxes, and limited itemized deductions for high-income individuals. However, it increased access to the earned income tax credit for low-income families, and limited the capital gains rate to 28 percent.

This may have been a blow to Republicans generally, who lost ground in both the House and Senate in the 1990 midterm elections. These elections were held on November 6, 1990. However, the events of the Gulf War pushed the issue out of the news, and Bush's popularity up. By February 1991, his approval rating rose to its highest level—89%.

== 1992 election ==
The reversal was used by the Democrats seeking their party's nomination, but it was first regularly used by Pat Buchanan during his primary election battle against Bush. Buchanan stated that Bush's reversal was one of his main reasons for opposing Bush. On the day he entered the race, he said it was "because we Republicans, can no longer say it is all the liberals' fault. It was not some liberal Democrat who said 'Read my lips: no new taxes,' then broke his word to cut a seedy backroom budget deal with the big spenders on Capitol Hill." Buchanan subsequently made extensive use of the 1988 quotation in his New Hampshire campaign, repeating it constantly in both television and radio commercials. Buchanan won a surprising 40% of the vote in New Hampshire, a major rebuff to the President.

The early response by Bush was that raising taxes had been essential due to the condition of the economy. Polling showed that most Americans agreed some tax increases were necessary, but that the greater obstacle was the loss of trust and respect for Bush. When the primary campaign moved to Georgia, and Buchanan remained a threat, Bush changed strategies and began apologizing for raising taxes. He stated that "I did it, and I regret it and I regret it" and told the American people that if he could go back he would not raise taxes again. In the October 19 debate, he repeatedly stated that raising taxes was a mistake and he "should have held out for a better deal." These apologies also proved ineffective, and the broken pledge dogged Bush for the entirety of the 1992 campaign.

Bush's eventual opponent Bill Clinton used the broken pledge to great effect late in the campaign. In October 1992 a television commercial, designed by campaign strategist James Carville, had Bush repeating the phrase to illustrate Bush's broken campaign promise. It was generally regarded as one of the most effective of all of Clinton's campaign ads. The tax reversal played a central role in reducing the public's opinion of Bush's character. Despite the variety of scandals that affected Clinton during the election, polls showed the public viewed Clinton and Bush as similar in integrity.

Even after the election, Clinton feared similar retribution from voters for raising taxes. Early in his first term, Bill Clinton was confronted by a larger than expected deficit. He responded with a tax increase, against the advice of aides, who insisted that he was breaking his campaign promise of a middle class tax cut. Ross Perot capitalized upon disenchantment with Bush and the status quo entering the 1992 race as an Independent candidate, leaving and subsequently re-entering. While the effects of his candidacy have been speculated, exit polls showed Perot essentially drew votes from Bush and Clinton evenly.

== Later views ==
Bush's broken promise was one of several important factors leading to Bush's defeat. Conservative talk show host Rush Limbaugh in his book See I Told You So, believes Bush would have easily won re-election had he not increased taxes. Republican pollster Richard Wirthlin called his promise "the six most destructive words in the history of presidential politics." Ed Rollins has called it "probably the most serious violation of any political pledge anybody has ever made." White House Press Secretary Marlin Fitzwater called the reversal the "single biggest mistake of the administration."

Others disagree with that view. Richard Darman does not believe that the reversal played a central role in Bush's defeat; rather he argues that it simply became a focal point for discontent with an economic situation that Bush had little control over. Others feel that the reversal was politically disastrous, but also good for the country. Daniel L. Ostrander has argued that Bush's actions should be seen as a noble sacrifice of his own political future for the good of the nation's well-being.

While the reversal played an important role in Bill Clinton's 1992 victory, it also played a role in the 1994 Republican congressional victory. Newt Gingrich, while a member of the congressional negotiating committee, refused to endorse Bush's compromise on the tax issue. He then led over one hundred Republican House members in voting against the president's first budget proposal. This made Gingrich a hero to conservative Republicans, and propelled him into the leadership role he would play in the "Republican Revolution" of 1994.

== Other uses ==
At a Republican primary debate in New Hampshire on January 6, 2000, George W. Bush, son of the former President, and Governor of Texas at the time of his campaign, was answering a question about his economic plans, when he referenced taxes. Manchester Union Leader reporter John Mephisto then asked "Is this 'no new taxes, so help me God?'," to which the candidate replied, "This is not only 'no new taxes,' this is 'a tax cut, so help me God'." Bush would go on to be elected and serve two terms. In Bush's 2004 reelection, taxes were typically seen as taking a back burner to foreign policy issues, though they had been lowered during his first term and many Democrats wanted to reverse the Bush tax cuts.

The phrase was subsequently used by Brian Lenihan, Jr., Irish Minister for Finance in 2009, promising not to raise taxes in the December 2009 budget. Ahead of the 2019 United Kingdom general election, Prime Minister Boris Johnson also evoked Bush's promise by saying "read my lips: we will not be raising taxes"—specifically naming income tax, value-added tax, and National Insurance (NI) contributions as taxes that would not be raised—and, like Bush, reversed on his pledge in 2021 by proposing a 1.25% increase in NI to subsidise health and social care.

== See also ==
- List of United States political catchphrases
- Peace for our time
- 1990 United States federal government shutdown
