= Speeches and debates of Ronald Reagan =

Seminal oratory of President of the US

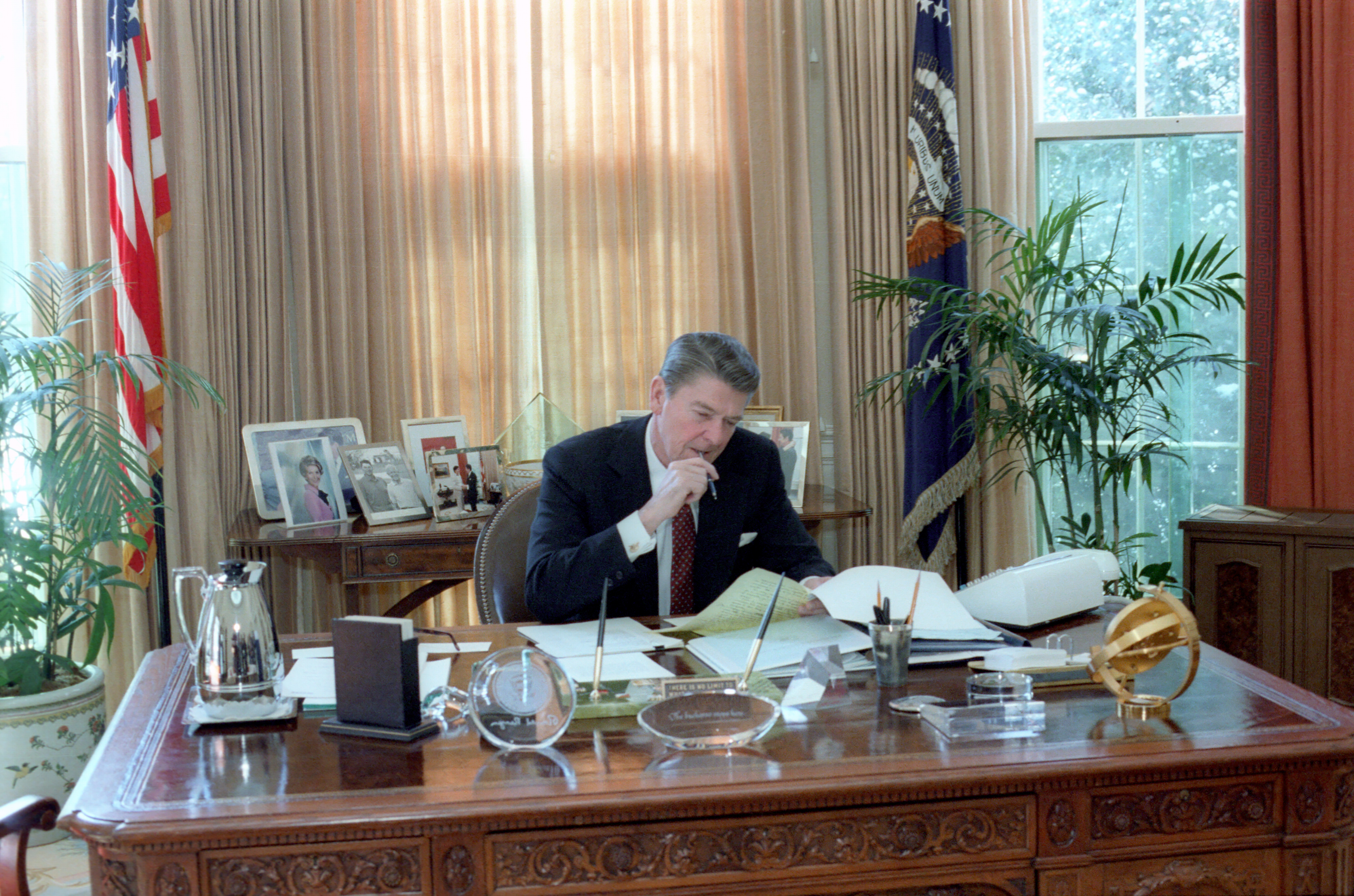
Reagan working on his first State of the Union Address in the Oval Office, 1982

The speeches and debates of Ronald Reagan comprise the seminal oratory of the 40th President of the United States. Reagan began his career in Iowa as a radio broadcaster. In 1937, he moved to Los Angeles where he started acting, first in films and later television. After delivering a stirring speech in support of Barry Goldwater's presidential candidacy in 1964, he was persuaded to seek the California governorship, winning two years later and again in 1970. In 1980, as the Republican nominee for president of the United States, he defeated incumbent Jimmy Carter. He was reelected in a landslide in 1984, proclaiming that it was "Morning in America". Reagan left office in 1989.

== Overview ==
Reagan as a WHO Radio announcer in Des Moines, Iowa, 1934–37

After graduating from Eureka College in Illinois, Reagan moved first to Iowa to work as a radio broadcaster. Then, in 1937, to California where he began a career as an actor, first in films and later television.

In 1964 Reagan endorsed the campaign of conservative presidential contender Barry Goldwater. In his speech, "A Time for Choosing", Reagan stressed the need for smaller government. The speech raised 1 million dollars for Goldwater and is considered the event that launched Reagan's political career. It also marked a shift of the Republican Party from a moderate to a "Western more politically charged ideology." California Republicans were impressed with Reagan's political views and charisma after his "Time for Choosing" speech, and nominated him for Governor of California in 1966. Reagan was elected governor and served two terms.

At the first Conservative Political Action Conference (CPAC) in 1974 Reagan addressed the attendees saying "We Will Be As a Shining City upon a Hill", in reference to John Winthrop's use of the City upon a Hill trope from Matthew 5:14; with the addition of "shining" it became Reagan's trademark expression.

In 1980 Reagan challenged Jimmy Carter for the presidency of the United States. During their only debate, Reagan used the phrase, "There you go again." The line emerged as a single defining phrase of the 1980 presidential election. The phrase has endured in the political lexicon in news headlines, as a way to quickly refer to various presidential candidates' bringing certain issues up repeatedly during debates, or to Reagan himself. The Associated Press wrote in 2008: "Reagan was a master at capturing a debate moment that everyone will remember. His 'there you go again' line defused his opponent's attack." In the general election Reagan won by a landslide.

Reagan was the first American president to address the British Parliament. In a famous address on June 8, 1982, to the British Parliament in the Royal Gallery of the Palace of Westminster, Reagan said, "the forward march of freedom and democracy will leave Marxism–Leninism on the ash-heap of history."

Reagan ran for reelection in 1984. The Democratic nominee was Walter Mondale. Reagan performed poorly in the first debate, but rebounded in the second debate, and confronted questions about his age, quipping, "I will not make age an issue of this campaign. I am not going to exploit, for political purposes, my opponent's youth and inexperience," which generated applause and laughter, even from Mondale himself. Mondale later recalled that

If TV can tell the truth, as you say it can, you'll see that I was smiling. But I think if you come in close, you'll see some tears coming down because I knew he had gotten me there. That was really the end of my campaign that night, I think. [I told my wife] the campaign was over, and it was.

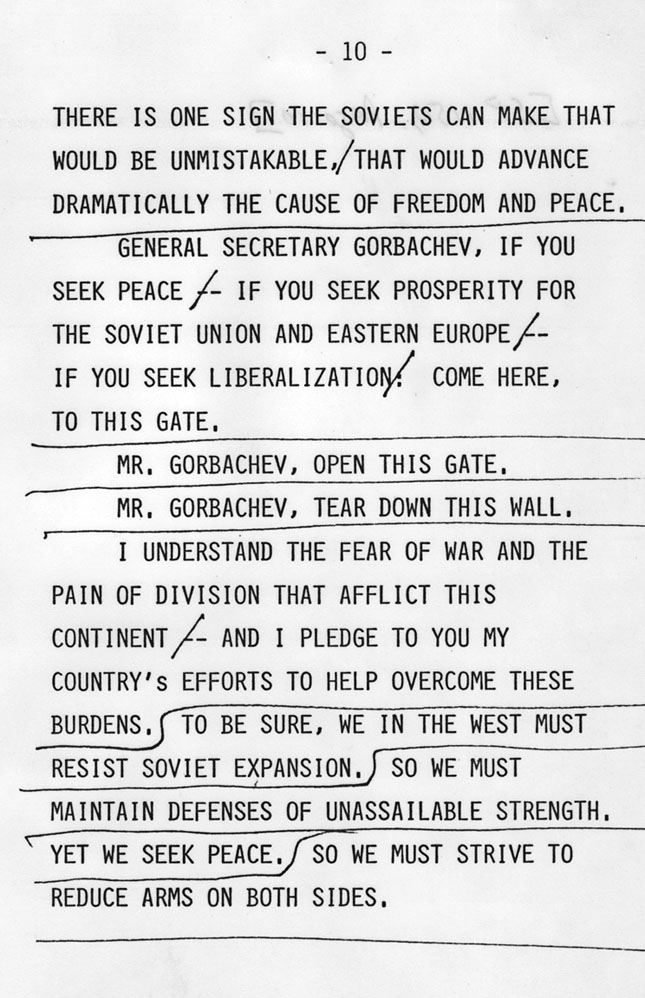
Page 10 of the "Tear Down this Wall" speech

The disintegration of the Space Shuttle Challenger on January 28, 1986, proved a pivotal moment in Reagan's presidency. All seven astronauts aboard were killed. On the night of the disaster, Reagan delivered a speech, written by Peggy Noonan, in which he said:

The future doesn't belong to the fainthearted; it belongs to the brave... We will never forget them, nor the last time we saw them, this morning, as they prepared for their journey and waved goodbye and 'slipped the surly bonds of Earth' to 'touch the face of God.'

Reagan believed that Western Democracy offered the best hope to open the Berlin Wall. On June 12, 1987, he gave a speech at the Wall in which he challenged Soviet leader Mikhail Gorbachev to "Tear down this wall!" Reagan's senior staffers objected to the phrase, but Reagan overruled them saying, "I think we'll leave it in." "Tear down this wall!" has been called "The four most famous words of Ronald Reagan's Presidency." Although there is some disagreement over how much influence Reagan's words had on the destruction of the wall, the speech is remembered as an important moment in Cold War history and was listed by Time magazine as one of the ten greatest speeches in history.

== Oratorical style ==
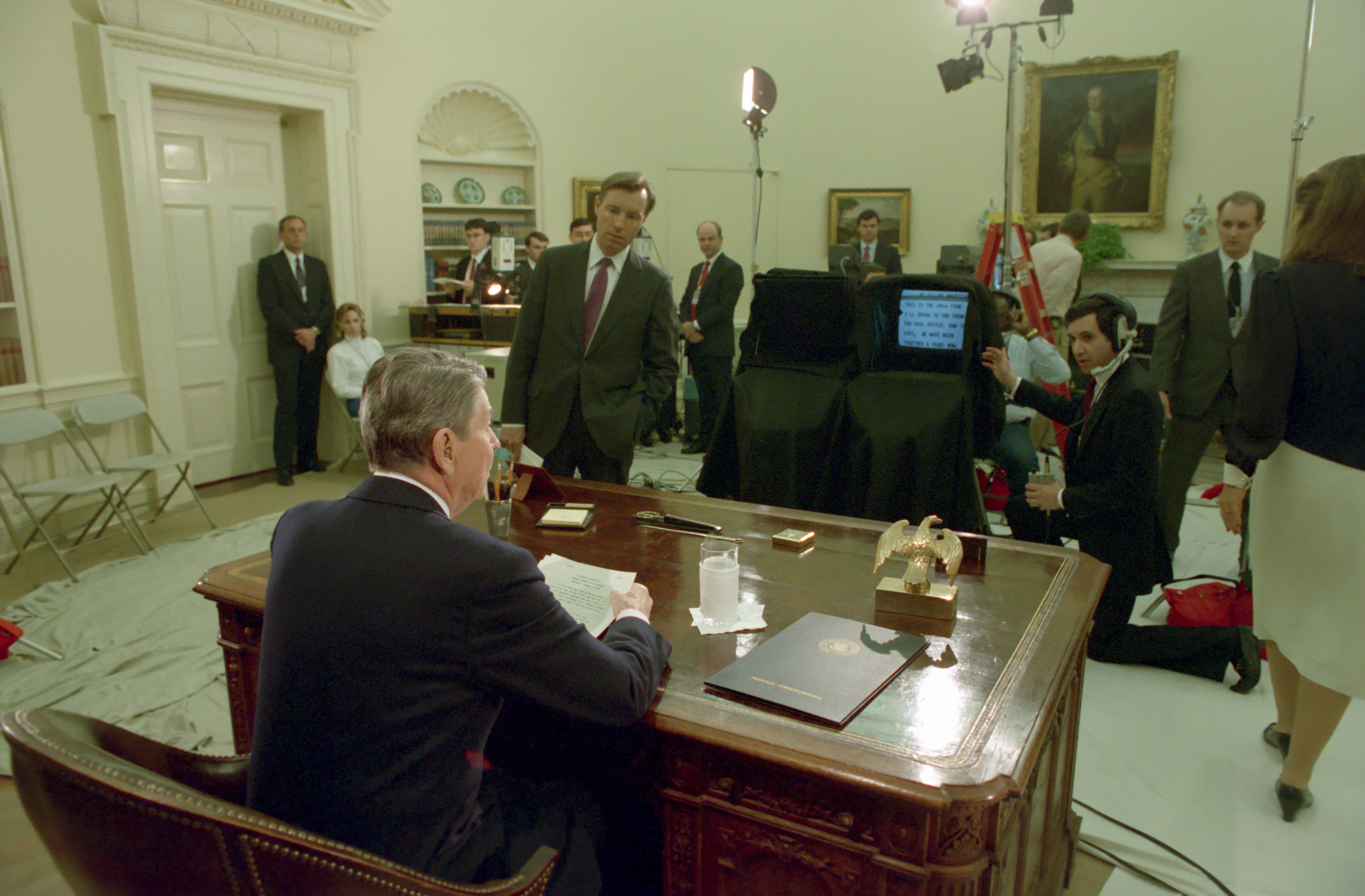
Reagan preparing for his farewell address to the nation from the Oval Office, 1989

Reagan's effectiveness as a public speaker earned him the moniker, "Great Communicator." Former Reagan speechwriter Ken Khachigian wrote, "What made him the Great Communicator was Ronald Reagan's determination and ability to educate his audience, to bring his ideas to life by using illustrations and word pictures to make his arguments vivid to the mind's eye. In short: he was America's Teacher."

Franklin D. Roosevelt, from whom Reagan often borrowed, ushered in a new age of presidential communication by broadcasting his "fireside chats" on the newly invented radio. Reagan, in his time, put his own stamp on presidential communication by harnessing the power of television broadcasting. He used skills developed during his radio, film and television career, and according to Lou Cannon, Reagan "set the standard in using television to promote his presidency." Khachigian noted three qualities that fostered Reagan's success. He described Reagan's voice as "a fine Merlot being poured gently into a crystal goblet." Reagan, a trained actor, has excellent "camera presence." Khachigan found Reagan's ability to create word pictures critical in communicating with his audience.

Reagan said that it was his "empathy" with the American people that made him an effective communicator and leader. Reagan was able to connect to people through storytelling. While this simple form of communicating led detractors such as Clark Clifford to label Reagan as "an amiable dunce", Michael K. Deaver likened this dismissive attitude to a "secret weapon."

At the end of his political career, Reagan reflected on the moniker "Great Communicator." At his farewell address he said:

I wasn't a great communicator, but I communicated great things, and they didn't spring full bloom from my brow, they came from the heart of a great nation–from our experience, our wisdom and our belief in the principles that have guided us for two centuries.

== Speeches ==
Key
Governor – first term (1967–1971)
Governor – second term (1971–1975)
President – first term (1981–1985)
President – second term (1985–1989)

Selected speeches of Ronald Reagan
Year	Date	Speech	Location	Media	Text
1964	October 27	"A Time for Choosing". In this televised speech Reagan stressed his belief in smaller government saying, "The Founding Fathers knew a government can't control the economy without controlling people. And they knew when a government sets out to do that, it must use force and coercion to achieve its purpose. So we have come to a time for choosing." The speech launched Reagan's political career.	Los Angeles, CA		
1965	September 28	"The Myth of the Great Society" In this speech, delivered after Lyndon Johnson unveiled and started to roll out his Great Society set of programs, Reagan offers a critique. His critique uses historiography, economics and Republicanism to offer his viewpoint that an expanded federal bureaucracy will do more harm than good	New Haven Arena, New Haven CT		
1967	January 5	"California and the Problem of Government Growth". In his gubernatorial inaugural address he outlined his direction for the state saying, "The cost of California's government is too high. It adversely affects our business climate. We are going to squeeze and cut and trim until we reduce the cost of government."	Sacramento, CA		
1974	January 25	"We Will Be As a City upon a Hill" is a line from a speech Reagan delivered at the first Conservative Political Action Conference (CPAC) which would become his signature saying.	Washington, D.C.		
1975	March 1	"Let Them Go Their Way". In the wake of heavy Republican losses in 1974 Reagan resists suggestions to "broaden the base." At the CPAC convention Reagan addressed moderates saying "let them go their way."	Washington, D.C.		
1976	March 31	"To Restore America". In a challenge to President Gerald Ford, Reagan announces his candidacy for the Republican presidential nomination in this televised address.	CA		
1976	August 19	"A Shining City on a Hill". Reagan's impromptu concession speech at the 1976 Republican National Convention has been called a "defining moment of the Reagan Revolution."	Kansas City, MO		
1977	February 6	"The New Republican Party" was a speech delivered at CPAC in which Reagan calls for expanding the Republican Party to African Americans.	Washington, D.C.		
1980	July 17	"Time to Recapture Our Destiny". Presidential nomination acceptance speech at the 1980 Republican National Convention. Regarding Democratic opponent Jimmy Carter he said, "A recession is when your neighbor loses his job. A depression is when you lose yours. And recovery is when Jimmy Carter loses his."	Detroit, MI		
1981	January 20	In his first inaugural address, which Reagan himself wrote, he addressed the country's economic malaise arguing: "In this present crisis, government is not the solution to our problems; government is the problem." Written by Reagan and Ken Khachigian.	Washington, D.C.		
1981	February 18	Address to a joint session of Congress	Washington, D.C.		
1981	April 28	Address on the Program for Economic Recovery	Washington, D.C.		
1982	January 26	First State of the Union address. Reagan spoke on economic issues in 1981 in lieu of a State of the Union address. The speech is known for Reagan's proposal to increase the power of the states, dubbed "New Federalism" by the media. Reagan recognizes Lenny Skutnik and starts a tradition. (excerpt)	Washington, D.C.		
1982	June 8	Address to the British Parliament. Notable for Reagan's use of the expression "ash heap of history" in predicting the fall of the Soviet Union. The phrase was suggested by Tony Dolan	London, UK		
1982	June 17	Reagan's first address to the United Nations General Assembly was extremely critical of the Soviet Union. He accused the Soviets of "tyranny," "ruthless repression" and "atrocities." He closed by saying, "We must serve mankind through genuine disarmament."	New York, NY		
1982	November 22	"Address to the Nation on Strategic Arms Reduction and Nuclear Deterrence." Reagan announces the deployment of MX missiles.	Washington, D.C.		
1983	January 25	In the 1983 State of the Union Address Reagan stressed that the economy was "on the mend." He warned that deficits were "a clear and present danger to the basic health of the republic" and recommended a far-ranging freeze on spending. (excerpt)	Washington, D.C.		
1983	March 8	Speech delivered to the National Association of Evangelicals. First use of the description "Evil Empire." The speech was written by Tony Dolan.	Orlando, FL		
1983	March 23	The Strategic Defense Initiative is outlined in an address to the nation.	Washington, D.C.		
1984	January 25	1984 State of the Union Address. Reagan reported that the economy is in full recovery and calls on Congress to work together to reduce deficits. He announces plans to build a space station saying, "We can follow our dreams to distant stars, living and working in space for peaceful economic and scientific gain." (excerpt)	Washington, D.C.		
1984	June 6	"The boys of Pointe du Hoc" speech was delivered on the 40th anniversary of D-Day in front of the Pointe du Hoc memorial. The speech was written by Peggy Noonan.	Normandy		
1985	January 21	Second inaugural address to the nation. Because January 20 fell on a Sunday, a public celebration was not held but took place in the Capitol Rotunda the following day. January 21 was one of the coldest days on record in Washington, D.C.; due to poor weather, inaugural celebrations were held inside the Capitol. Written by Reagan, Bently Elliott, Noonan and Dolan.	Washington, D.C.		
1985	February 6	1985 State of the Union Address. The Reagan Doctrine is introduced. Speech is given on Reagan’s 74th birthday.	Washington, D.C.		
1986	January 28	Address to the nation regarding the Space Shuttle Challenger disaster. The speech is ranked as one of the ten best American political speeches of the 20th century	Washington, D.C.		
1986	February 4	The 1986 State of the Union Address was postponed due to the Space Shuttle Challenger disaster. In the speech Reagan calls abortion "a wound in our national conscience" and he reopened the welfare debate saying, "in the welfare culture, the breakdown of the family ... has reached crisis proportions." He explains that the recovery was attributed to "the American people" and their "quiet courage and common sense..."	Washington, D.C.		
1987	January 27	1987 State of the Union Address. He said "mistakes were made" in the Iran–Contra affair.	Washington, D.C.		
1987	June 12	Brandenburg Gate speech. Reagan challenges Gorbachev to "Tear down this wall!." The speech made Time magazine's "Top 10 Greatest Speeches List" and was written by Peter Robinson.	West Berlin		
1988	January 25	1988 State of the Union Address. This was Reagan's last State of the Union Address. Not content to rest on his laurels, he announced a policy agenda. He famously summarized the effect of government intervention on the poor saying: "Some years ago the federal government declared War on Poverty, and poverty won." (excerpt)	Washington, D.C.		
1989	January 11	Reagan states in his farewell address: "They called it the Reagan revolution. Well, I'll accept that, but for me it always seemed more like the great rediscovery, a rediscovery of our values and our common sense." The speech was written by Peggy Noonan.	Washington, D.C.		
1990	November 19	"The Brotherhood of Man". At the dedication of a monument to Winston Churchill, Reagan discusses the fall of the Berlin Wall the previous year.	Fulton, MO		
1992	August 17	"Empire of Ideals" was a speech delivered at the Republican National Convention. Regarding Democratic presidential nominee Bill Clinton Reagan quipped, "I knew Thomas Jefferson. He was a friend of mine. And governor, you're no Thomas Jefferson." (excerpt)	Houston, TX		
1994	February 3	Remarks on the occasion of his 83rd birthday	Washington, D.C.		

=== Rankings ===
In 2009 a list was compiled by professors at the University of Wisconsin–Madison and Texas A&M University and based on the opinions of "137 leading scholars of American public address." The speeches by Ronald Reagan which made the list are below:

#8	Space Shuttle Challenger Disaster Address
#25	"A Time For Choosing"
#29	"The Evil Empire"
#30	First Inaugural address
#60	"Boys of Pointe Du Hoc"
#94	Brandenburg Gate Address

Time magazine listed the Brandenburg Gate Address on its list of "Top 10 Greatest Speeches".

== Debates ==
Selected debates of Ronald Reagan
Year	Date	Debate	Location	Media	Transcript
1980	February 23	Debate with former CIA Director George H. W. Bush for the Republican presidential nomination. When Reagan's microphone is turned off, the former governor paraphrases Spencer Tracy and yells, "I paid for this microphone, Mr. Green!"	Nashua, NH		
1980	October 28	Presidential debate with President Jimmy Carter. Reagan baits the president by saying, "There you go again," and in closing asks voters: "Are you better off than you were four years ago?"	Cleveland, OH		
1984	October 21	Second presidential debate with former Vice President Walter Mondale. President Reagan said he wouldn't hold Mondale's "youth and inexperience" against him.	Kansas City, MO		

== Behind the scenes ==
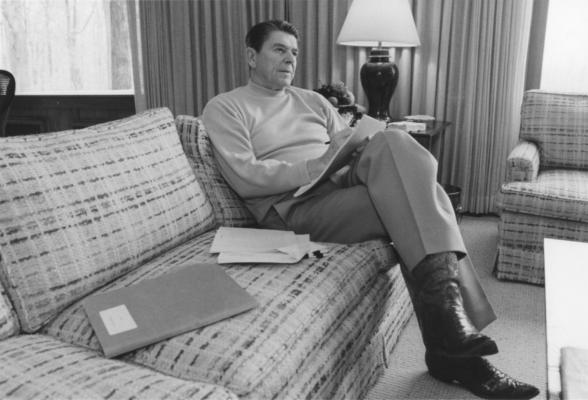
Reagan at Camp David working on the 1982 State of the Union

Reagan and David Stockman prepare for the presidential debate at Camp David, October 6, 1984

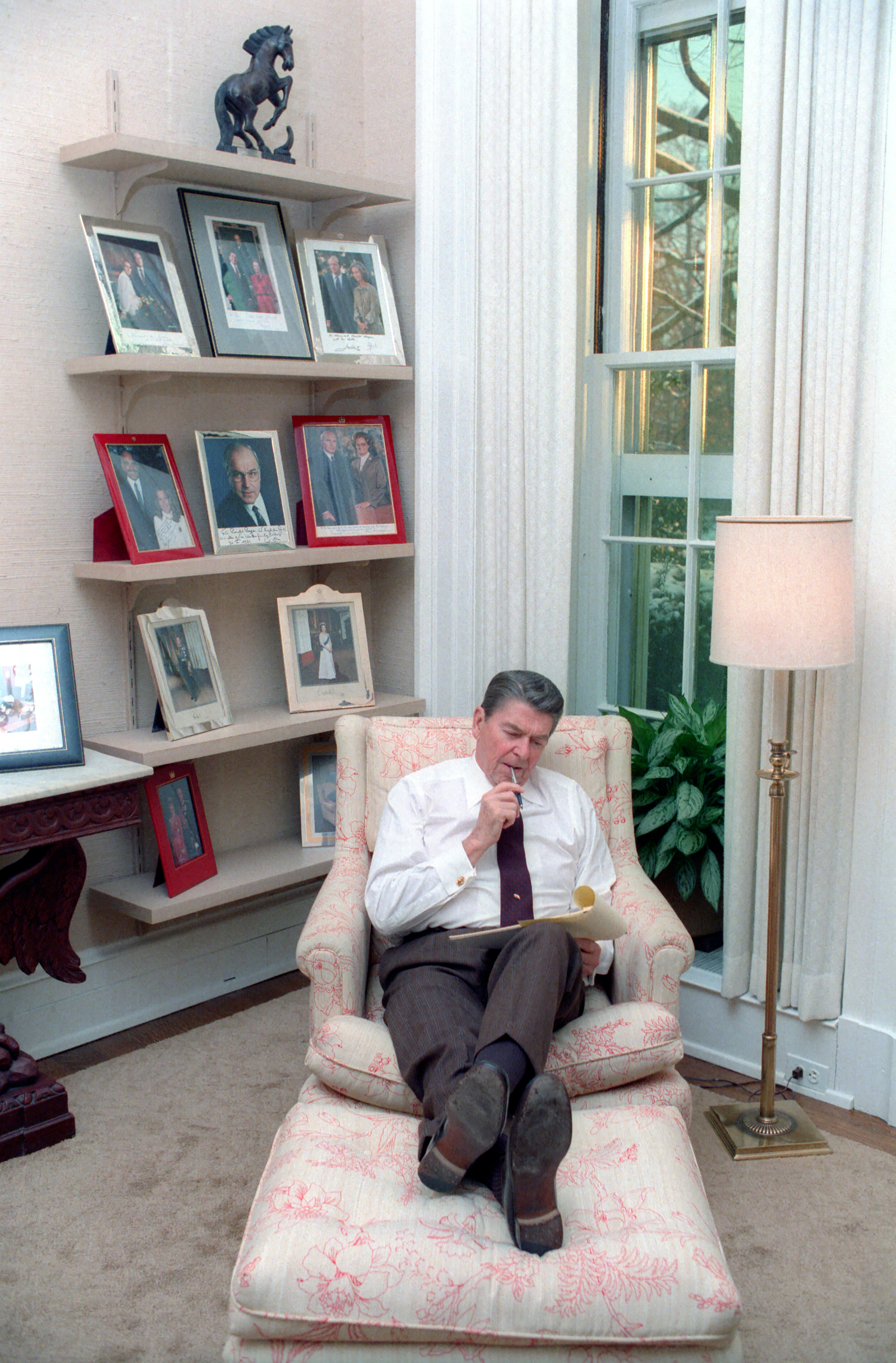
Drafting the second inaugural address in the Oval Office study, 1985

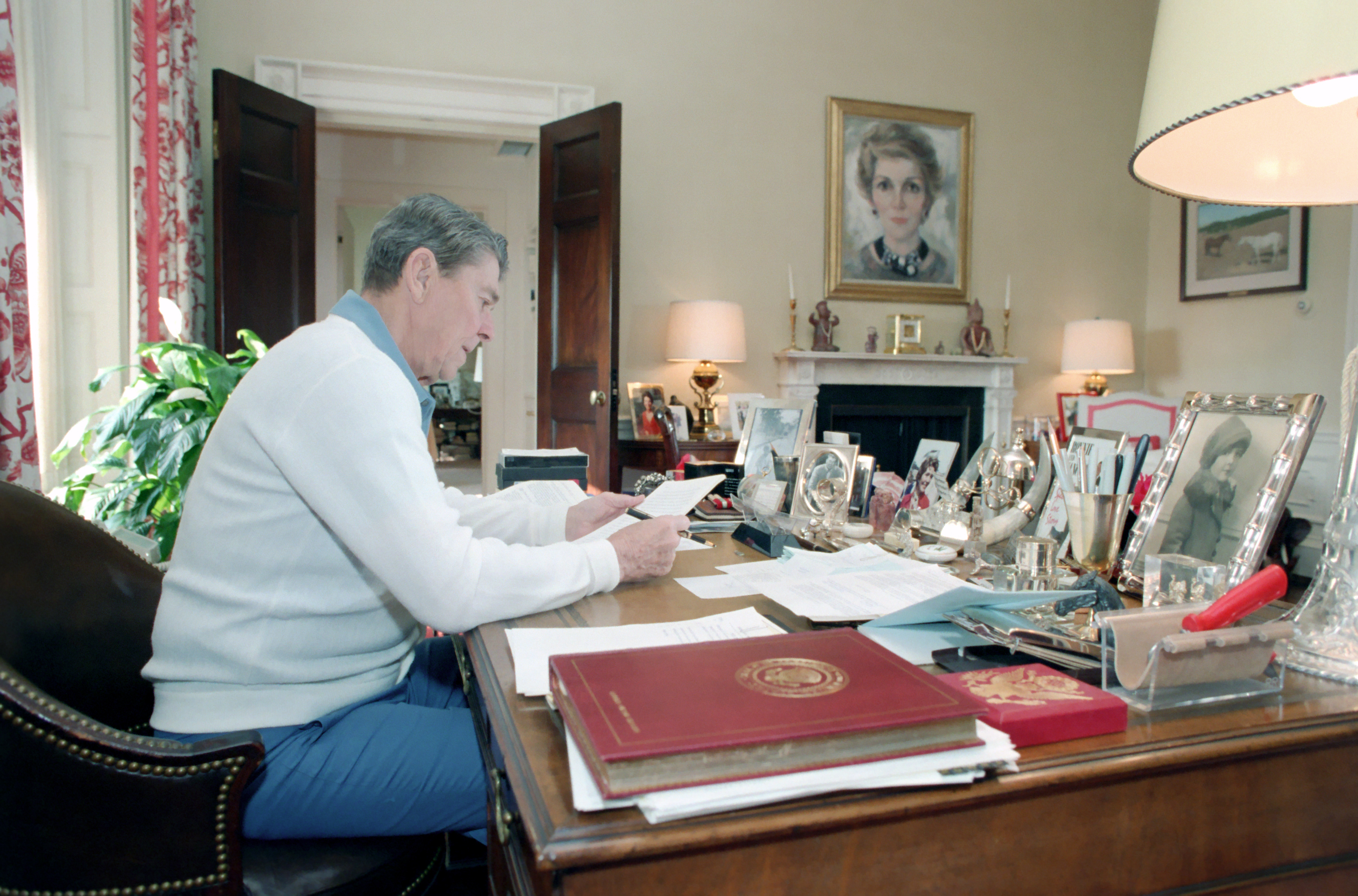
Writing the 1987 State of the Union address in the Residence

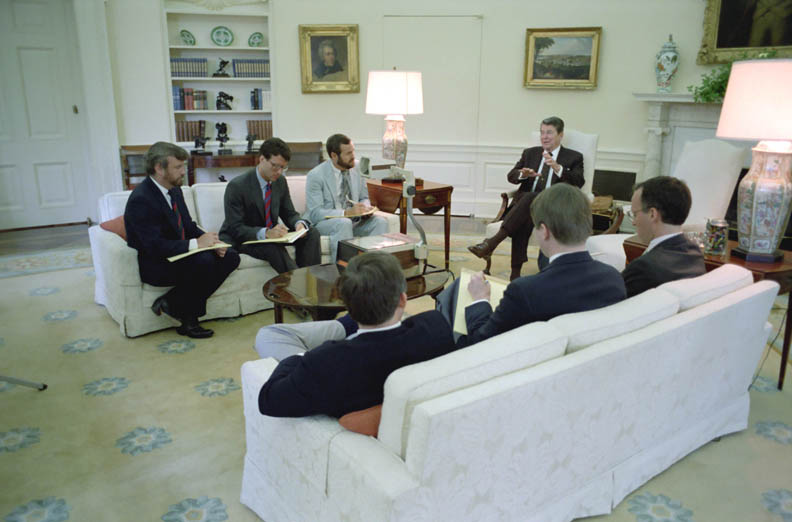
White House speechwriters meet to develop the Berlin Wall speech, 1987

== See also ==
- Ronald Reagan Speaks Out Against Socialized Medicine
- State of the Union address
- United States presidential election debates

Reagan speechwriters

- Tony Blankley
- Aram Bakshian
- Ben T. Elliott
- Jeffrey Hart
- Ken Khachigian
- Peggy Noonan
- Mari Maseng
- John Podhoretz
- Dana Rohrabacher
- David Tell
