= Ben T. Elliott =

American writer

Ben Elliott

White House Director of Speechwriting
- In office October 19, 1983 – June 6, 1986
- President: Ronald Reagan
- Preceded by: Aram Bakshian
- Succeeded by: Anthony R. Dolan (Chief Speechwriter)

Personal details
- Born: Bently Thomas Elliott; November 6, 1944 (age 82) Bryn Mawr, Pennsylvania, U.S.
- Party: Republican
- Education: Bucknell University (BA); Sciences Po (MA)

Bently Thomas "Ben" Elliott (born 1944) is an American writer who served as President Ronald Reagan’s director of speechwriting from 1982 to 1986. In this capacity he directed better known speechwriters like Peggy Noonan and Peter Robinson, both of whom he hired.

== Life ==
Elliott was born on November 6, 1944, in Philadelphia, Pennsylvania. He is a 1966 graduate of Bucknell University and a 1970 graduate of The Institut d'Études Politiques de Paris. At Bucknell he played free safety for the Bison football team and was a member of the Phi Gamma Delta fraternity. In 1962 he graduated from the Haverford School, which honored him with its Distinguished Alumni Award in 2007.

In 1978, he worked for the U.S. Chamber of Commerce. In 1980, he was hired as White House speech writer, by Ken Khachigian. In 1983, he succeeded him as chief speech writer.

When Treasury Secretary Don Regan took over as Reagan’s chief of staff in 1985, he asked Elliott to resign, which occurred in 1986. Eleanor Clift reported, “Elliott, a staunch believer in supply-side economics and a fervent right-to-life advocate, clashed with Regan and other top presidential assistants over the rhetorical tone of the President's State of the Union address last January. Although Elliott was widely believed to have won the battle, his language was nevertheless softened considerably.”

After leaving the White House, Elliott wrote speeches for Jack Kemp, William Simon, Steve Forbes, IBM, Pepsi, Goldman Sachs and the New York Stock Exchange. He serves as a speechwriter at Bank of America and is a trustee of Bucknell University.

He has four children, one of whom, Tom Elliott, is the founder and CEO of the news-clipping platform, Grabien.
