= The boys of Pointe du Hoc =

1984 speech by Ronald Reagan

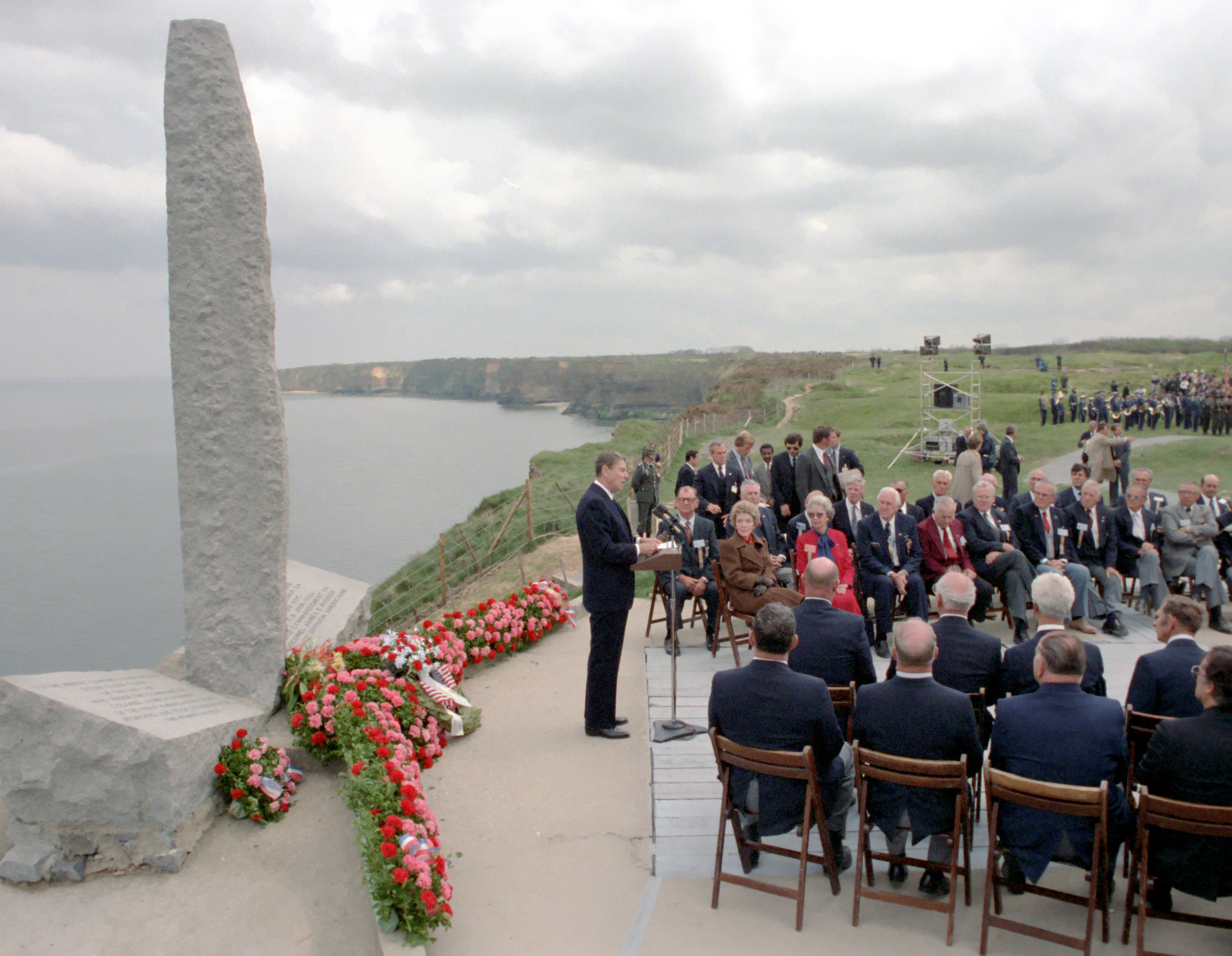
- Reagan delivers the speech in front of the Pointe du Hoc monument, 1984.
- Date: June 6, 1984
- Venue: Pointe du Hoc
- Participants: Ronald Reagan
- The full text of the speech at Wikisource

"The boys of Pointe du Hoc" was a speech delivered by United States president Ronald Reagan on the 40th anniversary of the Normandy landings at Pointe du Hoc to a crowd of soldiers who fought at the battle. The speech was written by Peggy Noonan.

The speech is often viewed as one of the best remembrance speeches by a U.S. president, and modern presidents are often compared to Reagan during their speeches on anniversary events of the Normandy landings.

== Background ==
Pointe du Hoc lies 6.5 km (4.0 miles) west of the center of Omaha Beach. During the Nazi occupation of France, as part of the Atlantic Wall fortifications, the prominent cliff top location was fortified by the Germans. At the end of the two-day action, the initial Ranger landing force of 225 was reduced to about 90 fighting men.

Pointe du Hoc now features a memorial and museum dedicated to the battle. Many of the original fortifications have been left in place and the site remains speckled with a number of bomb craters. On January 11, 1979, this 13-hectare field was transferred to American control, and the American Battle Monuments Commission was made responsible for its maintenance.

== Speech ==
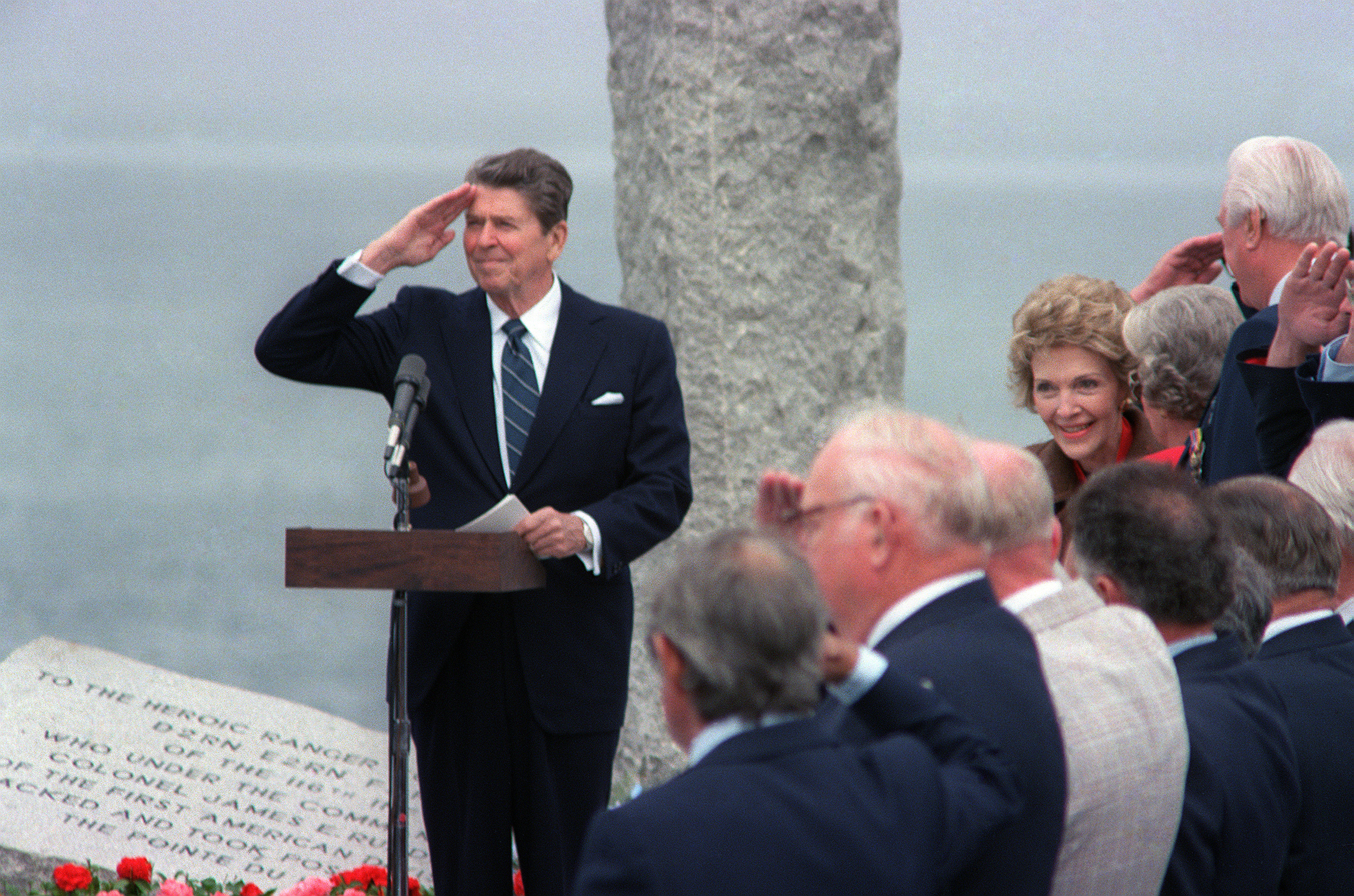
Reagan salutes the retired soldiers.

Recording of Reagan's speech at Pointe de Hoc

On June 6, 1984, United States president Ronald Reagan delivered the speech "The boys of Pointe du Hoc" in front of the Pointe du Hoc memorial atop the cliffs of Pointe du Hoc. In attendance were 62 survivors of the battle. Reagan referred directly to them in his speech:

These are the boys of Pointe du Hoc. These are the men who took the cliffs. These are the champions who helped free a continent. These are the heroes who helped end a war.

Noonan said she took the line "the boys of" from the title of the similarly named book about the Brooklyn Dodgers by Roger Kahn.

== Legacy ==
The speech is often viewed as influential in raising approval of Reagan's foreign policy abilities and seen as one of the best obituary or remembrance speeches by a U.S. president.

The speech was commemorated by American author and historian Douglas Brinkley in his 2005 book The Boys of Pointe du Hoc: Ronald Reagan, D-Day, and the U.S. Army 2nd Ranger Battalion.

Modern U.S. presidents are often compared to Reagan when they give speeches on the anniversary of the Normandy landings. Barack Obama was compared to Reagan in 2009 and in 2024, Joe Biden was said to have tried to evoke Reagan in his version of his Normandy address.

== See also ==
- Bayeux speeches
- Speeches and debates of Ronald Reagan
