= 1980 United States presidential debates =

Part of the 1980 U.S. presidential election

- September 21, 1980; October 28, 1980

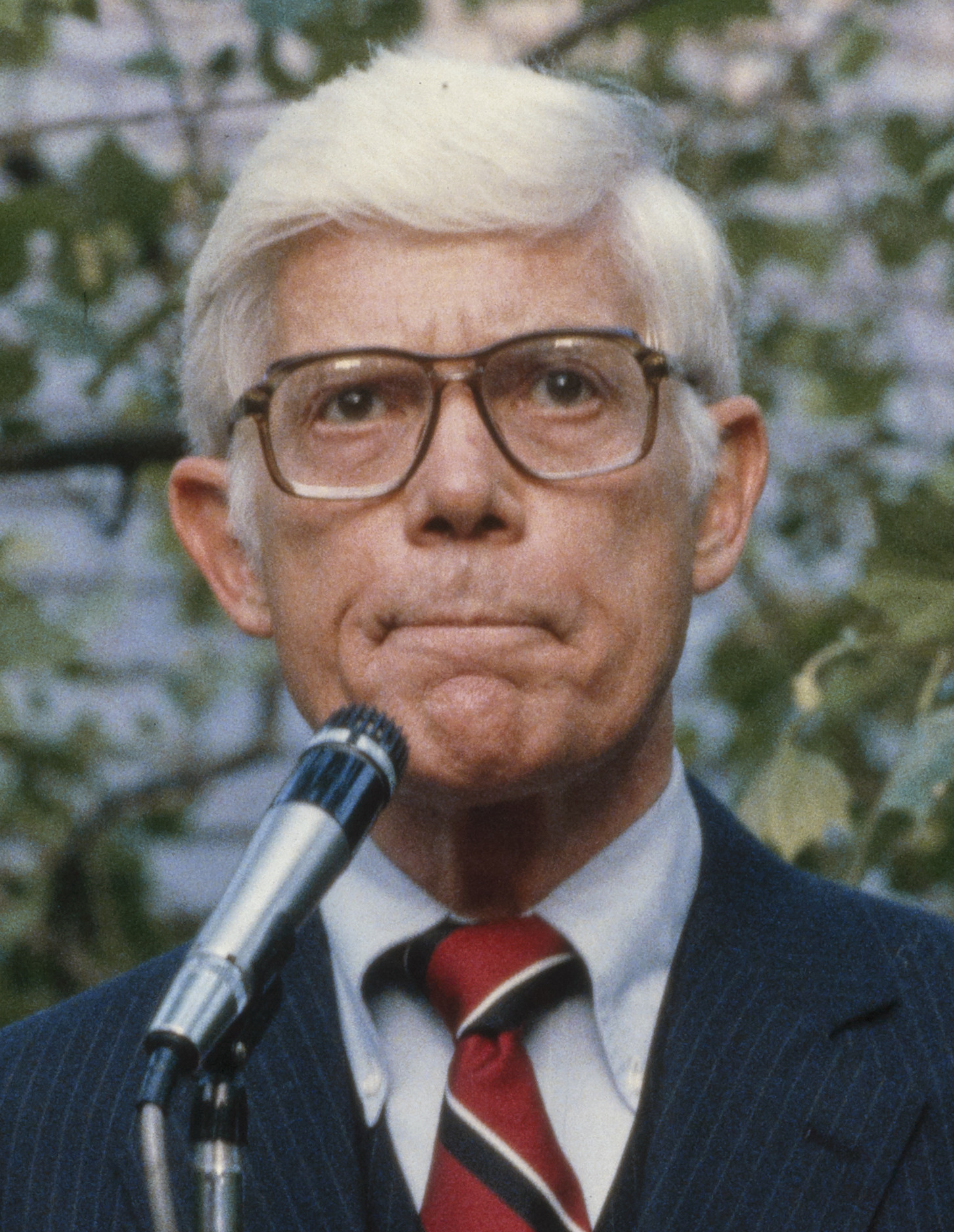
Nominee	Jimmy Carter (October 28)	Ronald Reagan	John B. Anderson (September 21)
Party	Democratic	Republican	Independent
Home state	Georgia	California	Illinois
- 1980 United States vice presidential debate
- October 2, 1980 (canceled)
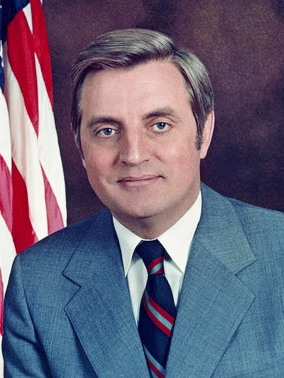

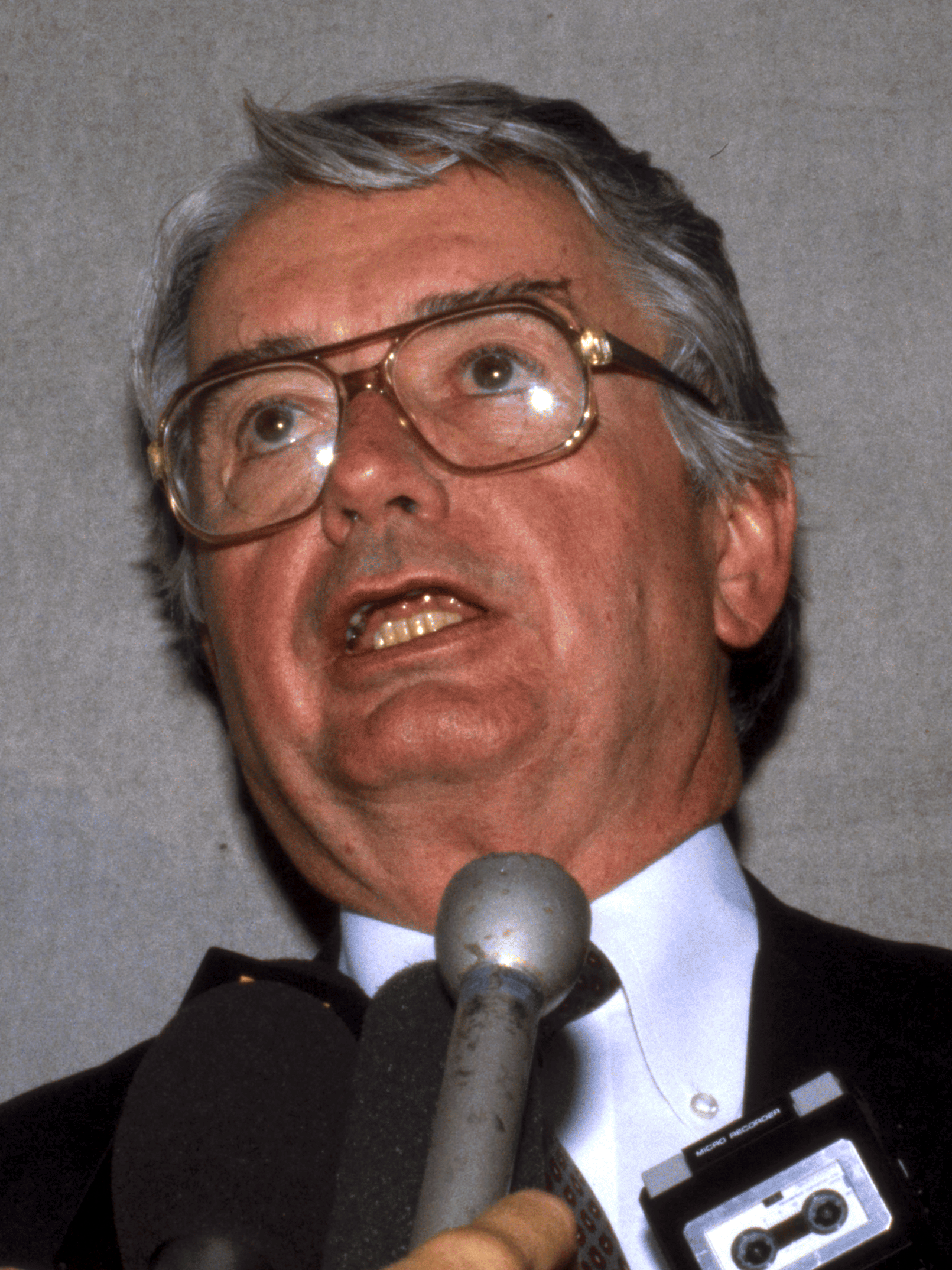
Nominee	Walter Mondale	George H. W. Bush	Patrick Lucey
Party	Democratic	Republican	Independent
Home state	Minnesota	Texas	Wisconsin

The 1980 United States presidential debates were a series of debates held during the 1980 presidential election.

The League of Women Voters sponsored two presidential debates: the first on September 21, and the second on October 28. The second presidential debate is the second most-watched debate in American history. Republican nominee Ronald Reagan participated in both debates. Independent candidate John B. Anderson only participated in the first presidential debate, while Democratic nominee Jimmy Carter only participated in the second presidential debate.

No vice presidential debate was held in 1980. Anderson's running mate Patrick Lucey was the only one who agreed to participate, while Carter's running mate Walter Mondale and Reagan's running mate George H. W. Bush both refused.

== League of Women Voters-sponsored debates ==
=== Negotiations ===
The tentative schedule for the debates, reported in August 1980, was as follows:

- September 18, in Baltimore, Maryland
- October 2, in Louisville, Kentucky (Vice Presidential debate)
- October 13, in Portland, Oregon
- October 27, in Cleveland, Ohio

The 1980 election featured a major third-party candidate, John B. Anderson. The League of Women Voters allowed for Anderson to participate in the debate if he polled above 15%.

The Carter campaign, believing that a three-way debate between Jimmy Carter, Ronald Reagan, and Anderson, would boost Anderson's campaign, tried to push for an earlier debate only featuring Carter and Reagan. This plan was supported by the chairs of the Democratic and Republican National Committee. The two-person debate did not materialize, and Carter declined to debate alongside Anderson.

The vice presidential debate was canceled on September 29, days before it was scheduled to be held. George H. W. Bush and Walter Mondale refused to attend, leaving only Anderson's running mate Patrick Lucey accepting the invitation.

=== Debate schedule ===
1980 United States presidential election debates
No.	Date and time	Host	Location	Moderator	Participants		
Key: P Participant N Non-invitee A Absent invitee					Democratic	Republican	Independent
Key: P Participant N Non-invitee A Absent invitee					President Jimmy Carter of Georgia	Governor Ronald Reagan of California	Congressman John B. Anderson of Illinois
1	Sunday, September 21, 1980 10:00 – 11:00 p.m. EDT	Baltimore Convention Center	Baltimore, Maryland	Bill Moyers of PBS	A	P	P
2	Tuesday, October 28, 1980 9:30 – 11:00 p.m. EST	Music Hall	Cleveland, Ohio	Howard K. Smith of ABC	P	P	N
1980 United States vice presidential debate
No.	Date and time	Host	Location	Moderator	Participants		
					Democratic	Republican	Independent
					Vice President Walter Mondale of Minnesota	Director George H. W. Bush of Texas	Ambassador Patrick Lucey of Wisconsin
~~VP~~	~~Thursday, October 2, 1980~~	~~Commonwealth Convention Center~~	~~Louisville, Kentucky~~	Canceled			

== September 21: First presidential debate (Baltimore Convention Center) ==
First presidential debate
- Date(s): September 21, 1980
- Duration: 60 minutes
- Venue: Baltimore Convention Center
- Location: Baltimore, Maryland
- Participants: John B. Anderson; Ronald Reagan
- Moderator(s): Bill Moyers of PBS

Debate between Ronald Reagan and John Anderson on September 21, 1980

The first presidential debate took place on Sunday, September 21, 1980, at the Baltimore Convention Center in Baltimore, Maryland. The three invitees were Carter, Anderson and Reagan, though Carter refused to attend due to the presence of Anderson.

Following a strong performance by Reagan, Anderson's poll numbers began to drop. Consequently, Anderson would not be invited to the second debate.

=== Format ===
The debate started at 10:00 p.m. EDT, and lasted for one hour. Anderson and Reagan both received six questions. They were given two and a half minutes to answer each question, as well as one minute and 15 seconds to rebut. Closing statements could be as long as three minutes.

== October 28: Second presidential debate (Music Hall) ==
Second presidential debate
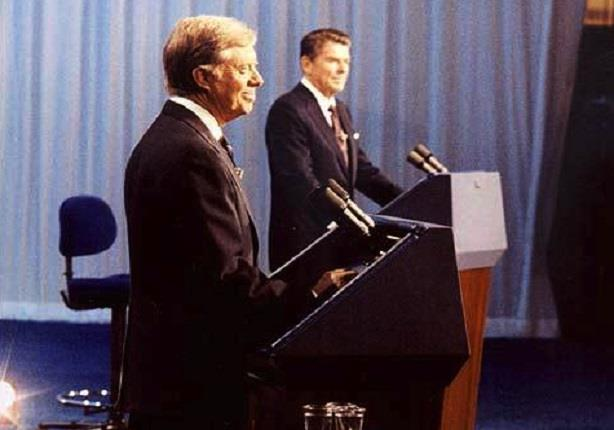
- Date(s): October 28, 1980
- Duration: 90 minutes
- Venue: Music Hall
- Location: Cleveland, Ohio
- Participants: Jimmy Carter; Ronald Reagan
- Moderator(s): Howard K. Smith of ABC

Debate between Ronald Reagan and Jimmy Carter on October 28, 1980

The second presidential debate took place on Tuesday, October 28, 1980, at the Music Hall in Cleveland, Ohio. Carter and Reagan were the only invitees. Reagan's most notable moments include using the phrase "There you go again" and asking whether or not Americans were better off than they were four years ago. CNN attempted to include Anderson from the Constitution Hall in Washington, D.C. CNN's Daniel Schorr read the same questions to Anderson. They then aired Anderson's live responses along with tape delay of Carter and Reagan's responses, despite technical difficulties.

=== Format ===
The second presidential debate started at 9:30 p.m. EST, and lasted for 90 minutes. The debate consisted of two halves, and panelists were only allowed to offer follow-ups in the first half. Candidates Carter and Reagan both received the same 12 questions and the ability to rebut twice for one minute each.

=== Viewership ===
According to Nielsen Media Research, the debate garnered 80.6 million viewers. It was the most-watched debate in American history until the first presidential debate of 2016.

=== Reaction ===
An unscientific televote poll carried out by ABC immediately after the debate received about 650,000 responses, two thirds in favor of Reagan.

=== Aftermath ===
In 1983, Reagan's campaign came under fire for having access to Carter's internal debate briefing materials.

== Other debates ==
A minor party debate was held by the New York Committee for Marxist Education on October 9. The debate was moderated by Bill Henning, and attended by representatives of the Communist Party USA, Socialist Workers Party, Socialist Party USA, Citizens Party, and Workers World Party. The only candidate to attend in person was Workers World's Deirdre Griswold.

== See also ==
- Jimmy Carter 1980 presidential campaign
- Ronald Reagan 1980 presidential campaign
- 1980 United States presidential election
