= Aram Bakshian =

American political aide and speechwriter (1944–2022)

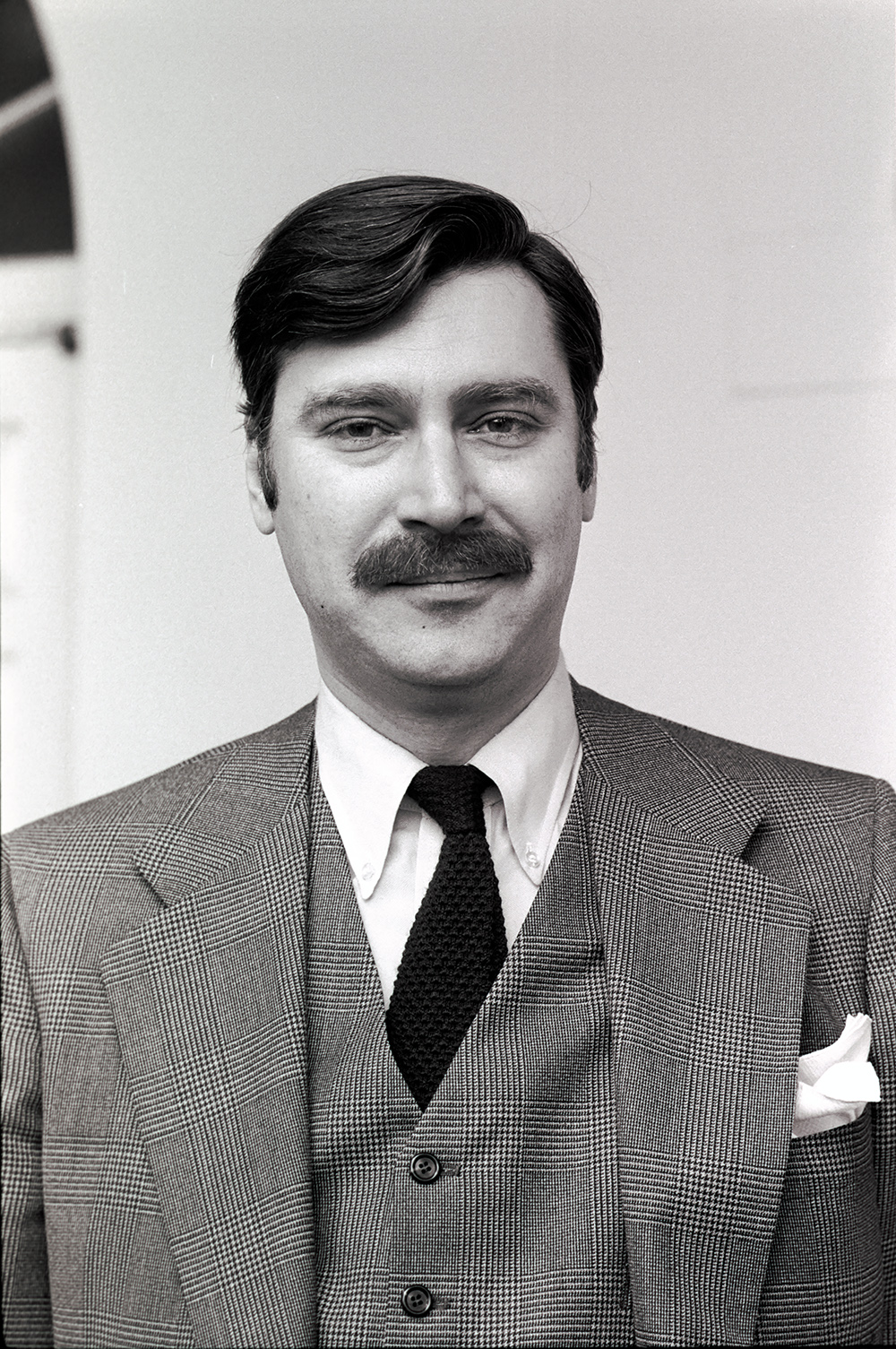

White House Director of Speechwriting
- In office November 17, 1981 – October 19, 1983
- President: Ronald Reagan
- Preceded by: Anthony R. Dolan (Chief Speechwriter)
- Succeeded by: Ben T. Elliott

Personal details
- Born: March 11, 1944 Washington, D.C., U.S.
- Died: September 14, 2022 (aged 78) Washington, D.C., U.S.
- Party: Republican

Aram Bakshian Jr. (March 11, 1944 – September 14, 2022) was an American political aide and speechwriter. He began his career working for Congressman Bill Brock (1966–70), then became a special assistant and speechwriter for Republican National Committee (RNC) Chairman Senator Bob Dole (1971). He joined the speechwriting staff of President Richard Nixon and, later, of President Ford (1972–75). He then became a senior consultant to Treasury Secretary William E. Simon (1976–77). Following his government service, Aram went on the lecture circuit as well as becoming a senior fellow at Harvard Kennedy School at Harvard University before being brought back for White House service.

President Ronald Reagan brought Aram on during his first term initially in the Office of Public Liaison as a Special Assistant to the President (Arts, Humanities, Education/Academia, and International Affairs (1981), before he was hired as the Director of the White House Office of Speechwriting (1981–83). In 1987, President Reagan nominated him to a term on the National Council on the Humanities (1987–92). Following his years in government, Bakshian began his tenure as the editor-in-chief of the periodic journal the American Speaker (1992 until his retirement in 2009). In 2014, he began to serve as a contributing editor to The National Interest magazine.

Aram died September 14, 2022, of pancreatic cancer.
