= A Time for Choosing =

1964 speech by Ronald Reagan

"A Time for Choosing" speech
- In support of Goldwater, Reagan delivers the address, "A Time for Choosing"—the speech launched Reagan to national prominence in politics
- Date: October 27, 1964; 61 years ago
- Duration: 29:33
- Location: Los Angeles County, California, U.S.
- Also known as: "The Speech"
- Type: Televised campaign speech
- Participants: Ronald Reagan
- The full text of the speech at Wikisource

"A Time for Choosing", also known as "the Speech", was a speech presented during the 1964 U.S. presidential election campaign by future president Ronald Reagan on behalf of Republican candidate Barry Goldwater. "A Time for Choosing" launched Reagan into national prominence in politics. He uses antithesis and rhetorical questions to convey a serious tone to the audience.

== Background ==
Many versions of this speech exist since it was altered over many weeks. Contrary to popular belief, however, the speech was not given at the 1964 Republican National Convention in San Francisco, California as a nomination speech for presidential candidate Barry Goldwater; Everett Dirksen gave that nomination speech, while Richard Nixon introduced Goldwater prior to his acceptance speech. Reagan, though he campaigned for Goldwater, did not use "A Time for Choosing" until October 27, 1964, when it was part of a pre-recorded television program, Rendezvous with Destiny (the title of the program was used by Franklin D. Roosevelt in his June 27, 1936 speech to the 1936 Democratic National Convention). In his autobiography, An American Life, Reagan recalled going to bed that night "hoping I hadn't let Barry down."

Speaking for Goldwater, Reagan stressed his belief in the importance of smaller government. In the speech, Reagan revealed his ideological motivation: "The Founding Fathers knew a government can't control the economy without controlling people. And they knew when a government sets out to do that, it must use force and coercion to achieve its purpose. So we have come to a time for choosing." He also said, "You and I are told we must choose between a left or right, but I suggest there is no such thing as a left or right. There is only an up or down. Up to man's age-old dream – the maximum of individual freedom consistent with law and order – or down to the ant heap of totalitarianism." The speech raised $1 million for Goldwater's campaign, and is considered the event that launched Reagan's political career.

== Aftermath and legacy ==
"A Time for Choosing" has been considered one of the most effective speeches ever made by an eventual presidential candidate. Following "A Time for Choosing" in 1964, Washington Post reporter David S. Broder called the speech "the most successful national political debut since William Jennings Bryan electrified the 1896 Democratic Convention with his 'Cross of Gold' speech." Nevertheless, Barry Goldwater lost the election by one of the largest margins in history. Soon afterward, Reagan was asked to run for Governor of California, which he did and won the election in 1966. When Reagan won the White House in 1980, George Will of The Washington Post referred back to "A Time for Choosing" and said, "Goldwater won the election of 1964... it just took sixteen years to count the votes."

In 2014, Steven F. Hayward, Professor of Public Policy at Pepperdine University and Reagan biographer, looked back at the speech and said, "at the time, critics thought the speech was too emotional; while others thought it was too controversial. But after the speech, it was clear that Ronald Reagan and his ideas were simply irresistible."

"A Time for Choosing" ushered in a conservative movement in American politics at a time when the country was looking for strong leadership following John F. Kennedy's assassination, and while experiencing both a growing welfare state and a raging Cold War. Reagan's speech in 1964 not only made him the leader of this movement but also earned him the nickname "The Great Communicator" in recognition of his effective oratory skills. Among Reagan's admirers, "A Time for Choosing" is known simply as "The Speech".
