= Peggy Noonan =

American political commentator and author (born 1950)

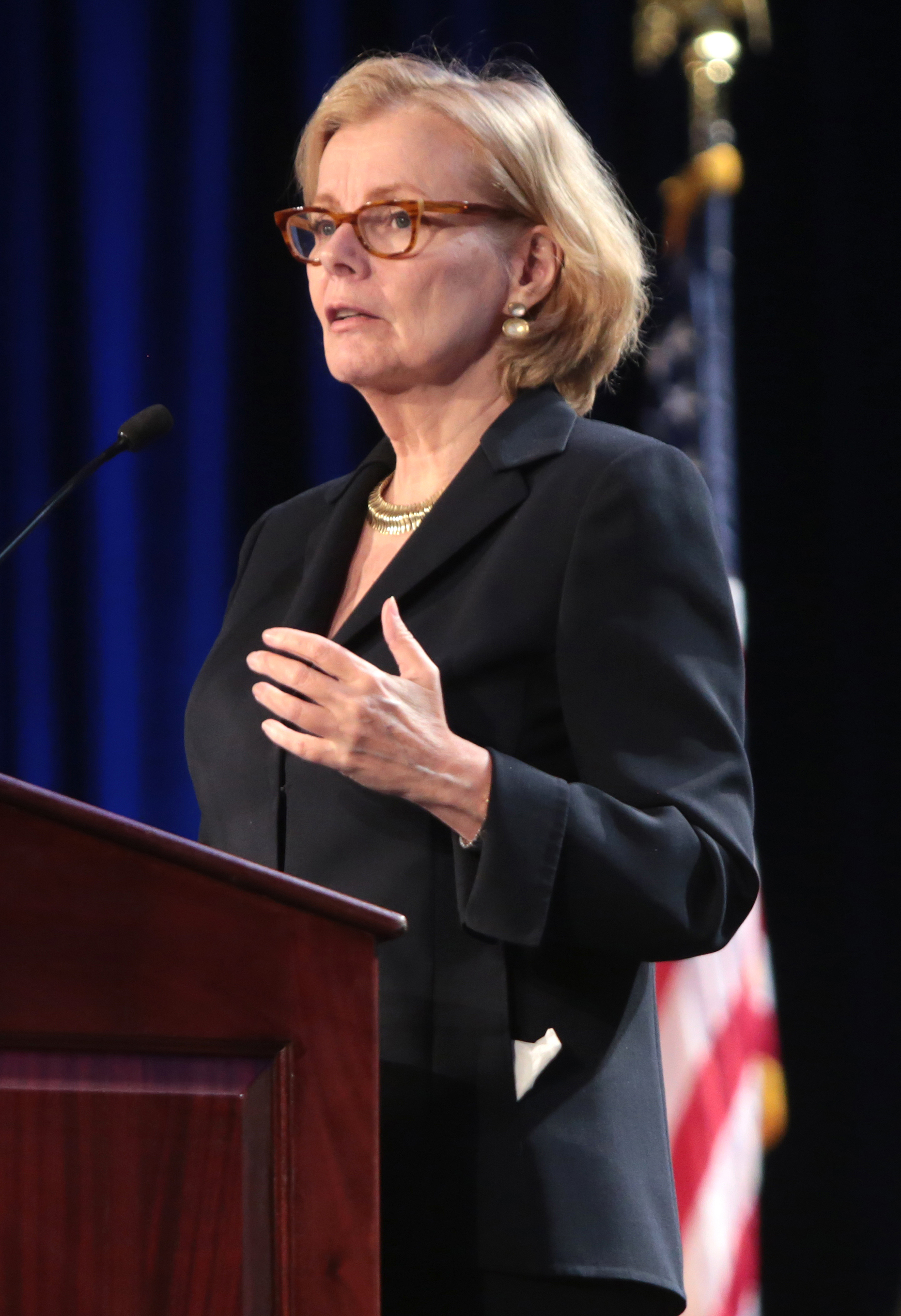
- Noonan in 2016
- Born: Margaret Ellen Noonan; September 7, 1950 (age 76); New York City, New York, U.S.
- Education: Fairleigh Dickinson University (BA)
- Occupations: Political commentator; political speechwriter
- Political party: Republican

Margaret Ellen Noonan (born September 7, 1950) is an American weekly columnist for The Wall Street Journal and contributor to NBC News and ABC News. She was a primary speechwriter and Special Assistant to President Ronald Reagan from 1984 to 1986. Five of Noonan's books have been New York Times bestsellers. Noonan was nominated for an Emmy Award for her work on America: A Tribute to Heroes.

== Early life and early career ==
Noonan was born on September 7, 1950, in Brooklyn, New York, the daughter of a merchant seaman. She is of Irish descent. Noonan grew up in Massapequa, New York, on Long Island and is a graduate of Rutherford High School in Rutherford, New Jersey, and Fairleigh Dickinson University. Noonan worked as the daily CBS Radio commentary writer for anchorman Dan Rather at CBS News, whom she once called "the best boss I ever had". From 1975 through 1977, she worked the overnight shift as a newswriter at WEEI Radio in Boston, where she was later Editorial and Public Affairs Director. In 1978 and 1979, she was an adjunct professor of journalism at New York University.

== Speechwriting ==
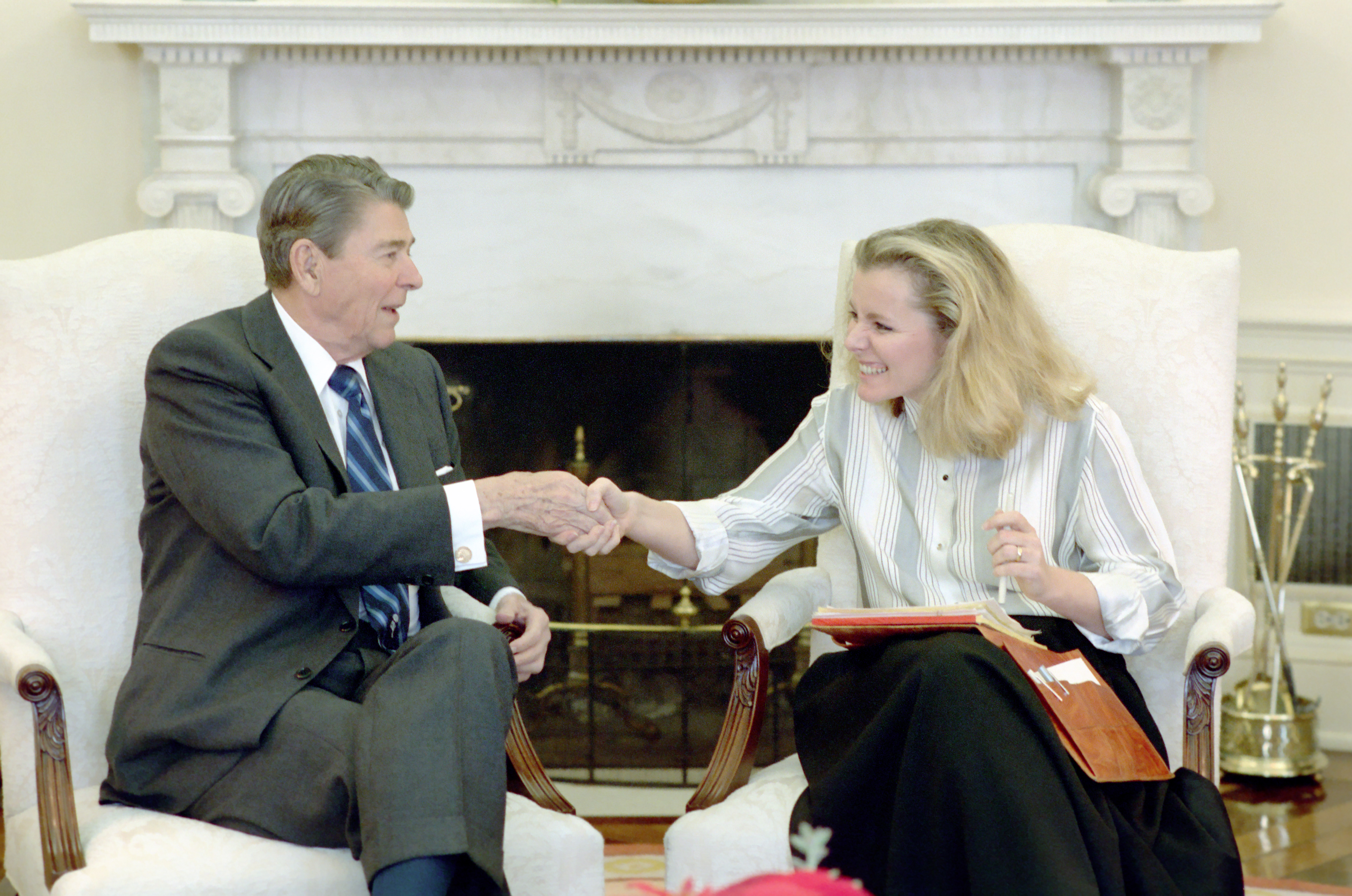
Noonan meeting with President Ronald Reagan in 1988

In 1984, Noonan, as a speechwriter for President Ronald Reagan, wrote his "The boys of Pointe du Hoc" speech on the 40th anniversary of D-Day. She also wrote Reagan's address to the nation after the 1986 Space Shuttle Challenger disaster, drawing upon the poet John Magee's words about aviators who "slipped the surly bonds of earth ... and touched the face of God." The latter is ranked as the eighth-best American political speech of the 20th century, according to a list compiled by professors at the University of Wisconsin–Madison and Texas A&M University.

Noonan worked on a tribute Reagan gave to honor President John F. Kennedy at a fundraising event held at the McLean, Virginia, home of Senator Edward M. Kennedy, in the spring of 1984. Later, while working for then-Vice President George H. W. Bush's 1988 presidential campaign, Noonan coined the phrase "a kinder, gentler nation", and also popularized "a thousand points of light", two memorable catchphrases used by Bush. Noonan also wrote Bush's acceptance speech at the Republican National Convention in New Orleans, in which he pledged "Read my lips: no new taxes". Bush's subsequent reversal of this pledge is often cited as a major reason for his defeat in his 1992 re-election campaign.

In 1995, Noonan received the Golden Plate Award of the American Academy of Achievement presented by Awards Council member and Pulitzer Prize–winning writer Edmund Morris.

== Later career ==
Noonan worked as a consultant on the American television drama The West Wing. In 2003, Noonan was a supporter of the US invasion of Iraq. In mid-August 2004, she took a brief unpaid leave from The Wall Street Journal to campaign for George W. Bush's reelection. In 2007, Noonan was one of the founding members of the now-shuttered wowOwow.com, along with Liz Smith, Lesley Stahl, Mary Wells Lawrence, and Joni Evans.

During the 2008 presidential campaign, Noonan wrote about Sarah Palin's vice presidential candidacy in The Wall Street Journal. In one opinion piece, Noonan expressed her view that Palin did not demonstrate "the tools, the equipment, the knowledge or the philosophical grounding one hopes for, and expects, in a holder of high office", concluding that Palin's candidacy marked a "vulgarization in American Politics" that is "no good ... for conservatism ... [or] the country". Tony Blankley sharply criticized Noonan for her criticism of Palin.

Noonan's weekly column for The Wall Street Journal, titled "Declarations", has been running since 2000. She is also a regular commentator on NBC's Meet the Press. In 2017, Noonan won the Pulitzer Prize for Commentary for "rising to the moment with beautifully rendered columns that connected readers to the shared virtues of Americans during one of the nation's most divisive political campaigns."

== Personal life ==
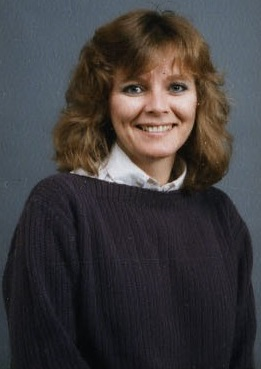
Noonan in 1986

In November 1985, at age 35, Noonan married 43 year old Richard W. Rahn, who was then chief economist at the US Chamber of Commerce. It was his third marriage, her first. Their son, Will, was born in 1987. Noonan and her husband were divorced after five years of marriage. In 1989, a few months after separating from Rahn, she returned with her son to her native New York. In 2004, according to an interview with Crisis Magazine, she lived in a brownstone in Brooklyn Heights with her son, who attended the nearby Saint Ann's School. As of 2026, her son, Will Rahn, is a senior editor and writer for The Free Press. Previously, he was the politics editor for Yahoo! News and the Washington bureau chief for The Daily Beast.

Noonan lives in Manhattan. She is a practicing Catholic and attends St. Thomas More Church on Manhattan's Upper East Side. Since the late 2010s, Noonan has distanced herself from the Republican Party under Donald Trump. In both 2016 and 2020, she declined to vote for either Trump or his Democratic opponent. In the 2020 presidential election, she wrote in 18th-century political philosopher Edmund Burke.

Noonan has received honorary degrees from several universities, including Adelphi University, St. John Fisher College, Miami University, University of Portland, the University of Pennsylvania, University of Notre Dame, Farleigh Dickinson University, and Harvard University.

== Reception ==
While Noonan's speechwriting has been praised, her books and Wall Street Journal columns have been the source of criticism and mockery. Critics have singled out her reliance on personal anecdotes to make broad assertions about current events and changes in American politics and society. During Hurricane Katrina, Noonan called for looters in New Orleans to be shot. Henry Giroux called it a "barely coded rationale to shoot low-income Black people."

In 2000, Noonan was criticized for a column claiming that Elián González was rescued from a shipwreck by a group of dolphins that "surrounded him like a contingent of angels", adding that this should be seen "as possible evidence of the reasonable assumption that God's creatures had been commanded to protect one of God's children." Richard Cohen described her as "unhinged" in The Washington Post.

In a March 2013 column, she used her experience staying at a short-staffed airport hotel to demonstrate the Obama administration's lack of focus on job creation and infrastructure spending, even though infrastructure was a significant component of Obama's American Recovery and Reinvestment Act, which Noonan had previously criticized in November 2010. In August 2019, Noonan was mocked for writing a column on Donald Trump's support among Hispanic Americans which centered on a conversation she had with a Dominican friend who worked at the deli counter at her grocery store.

Recurring themes in Noonan's books and columns include the decline of civility, social graces, religiosity, patriotism, bipartisanship and statesmanship in contemporary American politics and society, as well as enduring praise for past conservative political figures such as Ronald Reagan and George H. W. Bush. As a result, her writing is criticized for being overly nostalgic. In June 2019, after Noonan called on congressional Democrats to censure President Trump in the wake of the Mueller report, he attacked her on Twitter, calling her "simplistic" and claiming that she "is stuck in the past glory of Reagan". In June 2022, Trump issued a statement calling Noonan a "weak and frail RINO... who did much less for Ronald Reagan than she claims, and who actually said bad things about him and his ability to speak" after she wrote in the Wall Street Journal that the Republican Party was "rejecting" Trump in the aftermath of the 2021 United States Capitol attack. Jeet Heer criticized her writing about the Columbia University pro-Palestinian campus protests in The Nation.

== Books ==
External videos
- Booknotes interview with Noonan on What I Saw at the Revolution, February 18, 1990, C-SPAN
- Presentation by Noonan on Simply Speaking, February 19, 1998, C-SPAN
- Presentation by Noonan on The Case Against Hillary Clinton, April 3, 2000, C-SPAN
- Washington Journal interview with Noonan on Patriotic Grace, October 6, 2008, C-SPAN
- Presentation by Noonan on The Time of Our Lives, November 25, 2015, C-SPAN
- Interview with Noonan on The Time of Our Lives, November 21, 2015, C-SPAN

- Noonan, Peggy (2003). What I saw at the revolution: a political life in the Reagan era (1st Random House trade pbk. ed.). New York: Random House Trade Paperbacks. ISBN 978-0-8129-6989-4.
- 1994: Life, Liberty and the Pursuit of Happiness (ISBN 1-55850-509-1)
- 1998: Simply Speaking: How to Communicate Your Ideas With Style, Substance, and Clarity (ISBN 0-7881-6775-8) (Published in paperback under the title On Speaking Well)
- 1999: Character Above All (ISBN 0-684-82709-3) (one chapter in an anthology)
- 2000: The Case Against Hillary Clinton (ISBN 0-06-039340-8)
- 2001: When Character Was King: A Story of Ronald Reagan (ISBN 0-14-200168-6)
- 2003: A Heart, A Cross And A Flag (ISBN 0-7432-5005-2)
- 2005: John Paul The Great: Remembering a Spiritual Father (ISBN 0-670-03748-6)
- 2008: Patriotic Grace: What It Is and Why We Need It Now (ISBN 978-0-06-173582-0)
- 2015: The Time of Our Lives: Collected Writings (ISBN 978-1-45-556313-5)
- 2024: A Certain Idea of America: Selected Writings (ISBN 978-0593854778)
