= There you go again =

American political catchphrase

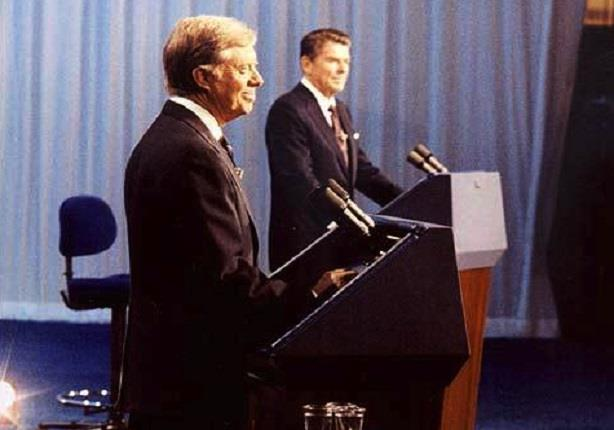
President Carter (left) and former Governor Reagan (right) at the presidential debate on October 28, 1980

"There you go again" was a phrase spoken during the second United States presidential debate of 1980 by Republican presidential candidate Ronald Reagan to his Democratic opponent, incumbent President Jimmy Carter. Reagan would use the line in a few debates over the years, always in a way intended to disarm his opponent.

"There you go again" emerged as a defining phrase of the 1980 presidential election. The phrase has endured in the political lexicon in news headlines, as a way to quickly imply that an opponent is engaged in hyperbole or even hysterical comments.

== Context ==
The second debate between Reagan and Carter of the 1980 presidential election year was held (October 28) a week before Election Day by the League of Women Voters. At one point, Carter went on the offensive against Reagan's record regarding Medicare.

President Carter: These constant suggestions that the basic Social Security System should be changed does call for concern and consternation among the aged of our country. It is obvious that we should have a commitment to them, that Social Security benefits should not be taxed and that there would be no peremptory change in the standards by which Social Security payments are made to retired people... Governor Reagan, as a matter of fact, began his political career campaigning around this nation against Medicare. Now, we have an opportunity to move toward national health insurance, with an emphasis on the prevention of disease, an emphasis on out-patient care, not in-patient care; an emphasis on hospital cost containment to hold down the cost of hospital care for those who are ill, an emphasis on catastrophic health insurance, so that if a family is threatened with being wiped out economically because of a very high medical bill, then the insurance would help pay for it. These are the kinds of elements of a national health insurance, important to the American people. Governor Reagan, again, typically is against such a proposal.

(Moderator) Howard K. Smith: Governor?

Governor Reagan: There you go again. When I opposed Medicare, there was another piece of legislation meeting the same problem before the Congress. I happened to favor the other piece of legislation and thought that it would be better for the senior citizens and provide better care than the one that was finally passed. I was not opposing the principle of providing care for them. I was opposing one piece of legislation versus another.

An Associated Press article from 2008 stated:

Reagan was a master at capturing a debate moment that everyone will remember. His 'there you go again' line defused his opponent's attack.

== Later use ==
Reagan used the phrase during the first 1984 presidential debate against Walter Mondale.

Reagan sometimes used the phrase during his presidential press conferences.

In the first 1996 presidential debate Republican presidential nominee Bob Dole used the line against President Bill Clinton.

In the 2008 vice presidential debate, Republican vice presidential nominee Sarah Palin used the line on her Democratic opponent Joe Biden.

During the 2012 presidential election, former President Bill Clinton paraphrased the line after criticizing the policies of the Republican platform by saying, "There they go again."

In the 2016 vice presidential debate, Republican vice presidential nominee Mike Pence used the line "There they go again" in responding to Democratic vice presidential nominee Tim Kaine's statement that Pence was a "chief cheerleader for the privatization of social security."

In a 2024 presidential debate, Donald Trump used the phrase "there she goes again" in reference to Kamala Harris, who accused Trump of supporting a nationwide abortion ban.
