= Vice presidency of George H. W. Bush =

U.S. vice presidential tenure from 1981 to 1989

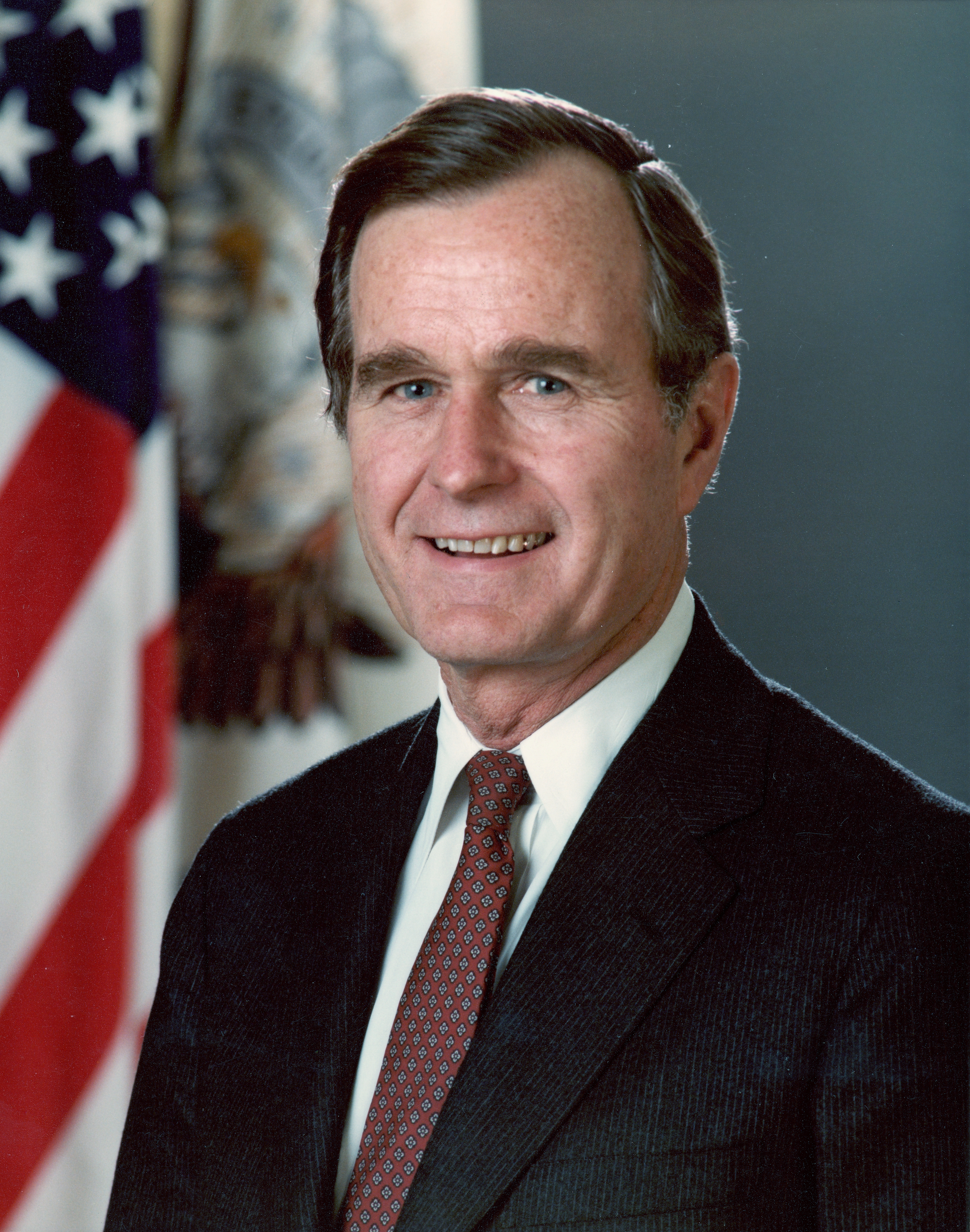
- Official portrait, 1981
- Vice presidency of George H. W. Bush; January 20, 1981 – January 20, 1989
- President: Ronald Reagan
- Cabinet: See list
- Party: Republican
- Election: 1980; 1984
- Seat: Number One Observatory Circle
- Seal of the Vice President

George H. W. Bush was the 43rd vice president of the United States during the presidency of Ronald Reagan from January 20, 1981, to January 20, 1989. Bush, a member of the Republican Party who previously served in various other federal positions, was selected as Reagan's running mate and took office following their victory in the 1980 presidential election over Democratic incumbent president Jimmy Carter and vice president Walter Mondale. Four years later, in the 1984 presidential election, they defeated Democratic nominees, Mondale and Geraldine Ferraro, to win re-election.

Near the end of his tenure, Bush ran for president as the Republican nominee in the 1988 presidential election and selected junior Indiana senator Dan Quayle as his running mate. Bush and his running mate Quayle defeated Democratic nominees, Michael Dukakis and Lloyd Bentsen. As vice president in his capacity as the president of the Senate, Bush oversaw the certification of himself and his running mate as the winners of the election on January 4, 1989. Reagan and Bush were succeeded in office by himself and Quayle on January 20, 1989. Bush became the first vice president to be elected president since Richard Nixon and first sitting vice president to be elected president since Martin Van Buren.

== 1980 presidential election ==
=== Presidential campaign ===
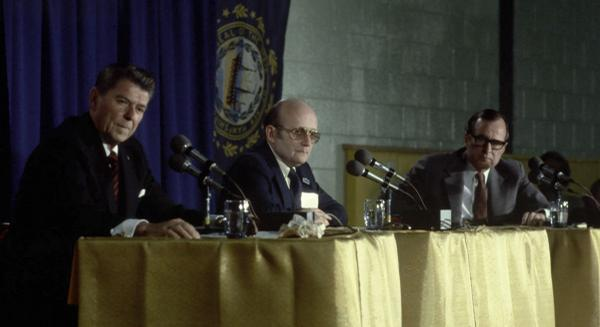
Ronald Reagan, moderator Jon Breen, and Bush at the presidential debate in Nashua, New Hampshire, during the Republican party presidential primary in 1980

Bush's tenure at the CIA ended after Carter narrowly defeated Ford in the 1976 presidential election. Out of public office for the first time since the 1960s, Bush became chairman on the executive committee of the First International Bank in Houston. He also spent a year as a part-time professor of Administrative Science at Rice University's Jones School of Business, continued his membership in the Council on Foreign Relations, and joined the Trilateral Commission. Meanwhile, he began to lay the groundwork for his candidacy in the 1980 Republican Party presidential primaries. In the 1980 Republican primary campaign, Bush faced Ronald Reagan, who was widely regarded as the front-runner, as well as other contenders like Senator Bob Dole, Senator Howard Baker, Texas Governor John Connally, Congressman Phil Crane, and Congressman John B. Anderson.

Bush's campaign cast him as a youthful, "thinking man's candidate" who would emulate the pragmatic conservatism of President Eisenhower. Amid the Soviet–Afghan War, which brought an end to a period of détente, and the Iran hostage crisis, in which 52 Americans were taken hostage, the campaign highlighted Bush's foreign policy experience. At the outset of the race, Bush focused heavily on winning the January 21 Iowa caucuses, making 31 visits to the state. He won a close victory in Iowa with 31.5% to Reagan's 29.4%. After the win, Bush stated that his campaign was full of momentum, or "the Big Mo", and Reagan reorganized his campaign. Partly in response to the Bush campaign's frequent questioning of Reagan's age (Reagan turned 69 in 1980), the Reagan campaign stepped up attacks on Bush, painting him as an elitist who was not truly committed to conservatism. Prior to the New Hampshire primary, Bush and Reagan agreed to a two-person debate, organized by The Nashua Telegraph but paid for by the Reagan campaign.

Days before the debate, Reagan announced that he would invite four other candidates to the debate; Bush, who had hoped that the one-on-one debate would allow him to emerge as the main alternative to Reagan in the primaries, refused to debate the other candidates. All six candidates took the stage, but Bush refused to speak in the presence of the other candidates. Ultimately, the other four candidates left the stage, and the debate continued, but Bush's refusal to debate anyone other than Reagan badly damaged his campaign in New Hampshire. He decisively lost New Hampshire's primary to Reagan, winning just 23 percent of the vote. Bush revitalized his campaign with a victory in Massachusetts but lost the next several primaries. As Reagan built up a commanding delegate lead, Bush refused to end his campaign, but the other candidates dropped out of the race. Criticizing his more conservative rival's policy proposals, Bush famously labeled Reagan's supply side–influenced plans for massive tax cuts as "voodoo economics". Though he favored lower taxes, Bush feared that dramatic reductions in taxation would lead to deficits and, in turn, cause inflation.

=== Vice presidential campaign ===
The Reagan–Bush ticket won the 1980 presidential election with 50.7% of the popular vote and a large majority of the electoral vote.

After Reagan clinched a majority of delegates in late May, Bush reluctantly dropped out of the race. At the 1980 Republican National Convention, Reagan made the last-minute decision to select Bush as his vice presidential nominee after negotiations with Ford regarding a Reagan–Ford ticket collapsed. Though Reagan had resented many of the Bush campaign's attacks during the primary campaign, and several conservative leaders had actively opposed Bush's nomination, Reagan ultimately decided that Bush's popularity with moderate Republicans made him the best and safest pick. Bush, who had believed his political career might be over following the primaries, eagerly accepted the position and threw himself into campaigning for the Reagan–Bush ticket. The 1980 general election campaign between Reagan and Carter was conducted amid a multitude of domestic concerns and the ongoing Iran hostage crisis, and Reagan sought to focus the race on Carter's handling of the economy. Though the race was widely regarded as a close contest for most of the campaign, Reagan ultimately won over the large majority of undecided voters. Reagan took 50.7 percent of the popular vote and 489 of the 538 electoral votes, while Carter won 41% of the popular vote and John Anderson, running as an independent candidate, won 6.6% of the popular vote.

== Vice presidency (1981–1989) ==
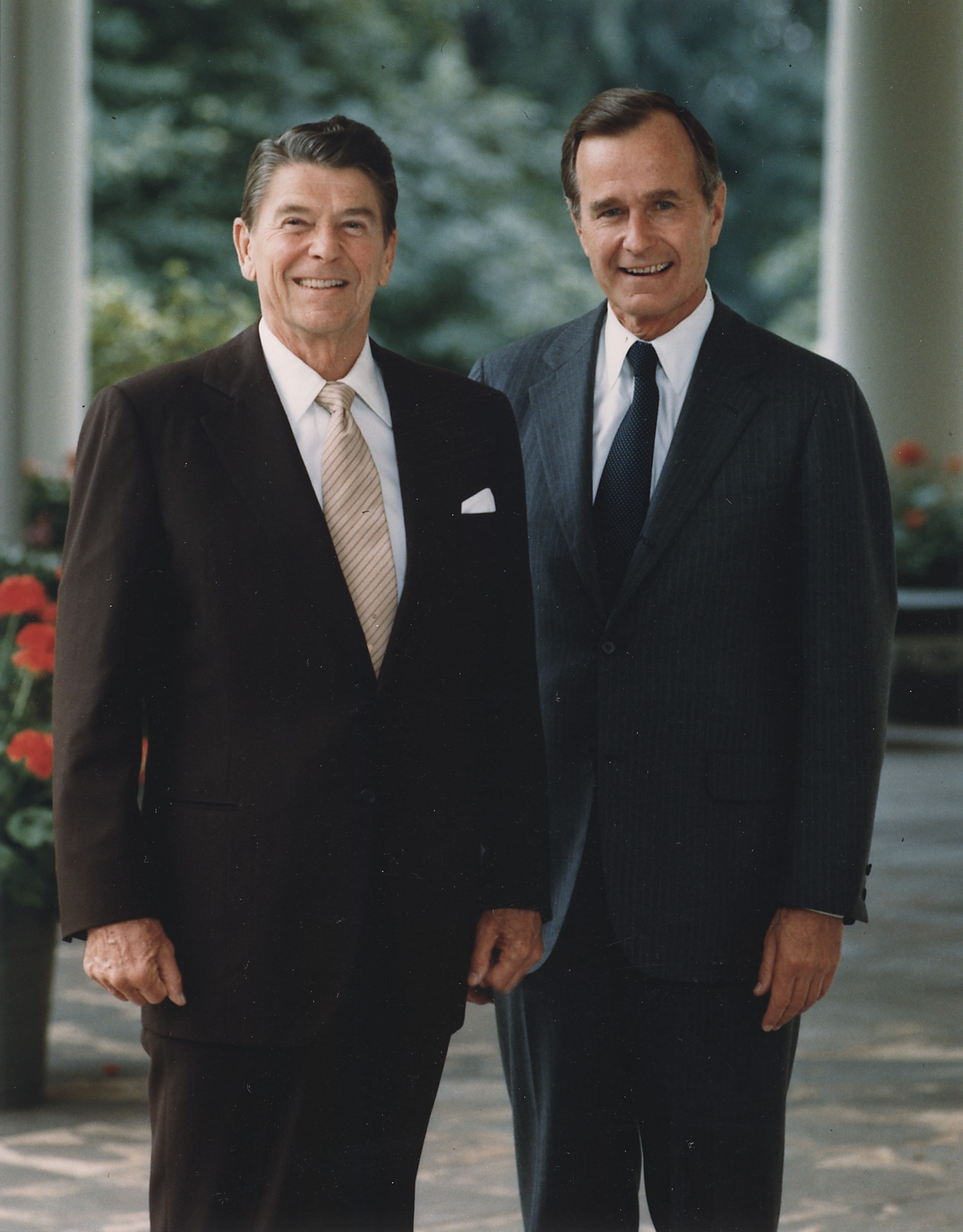
Bush with President Ronald Reagan in 1981

As vice president, Bush generally maintained a low profile, recognizing the constitutional limits of the office; he avoided decision-making or criticizing Reagan in any way. This approach helped him earn Reagan's trust, easing tensions left over from their earlier rivalry. Bush also generally enjoyed a good relationship with Reagan staffers, including Bush's close friend James Baker, who served as Reagan's initial chief of staff. His understanding of the vice presidency was heavily influenced by Vice President Walter Mondale, who enjoyed a strong relationship with Carter in part because of his ability to avoid confrontations with senior staff and Cabinet members, and by Vice President Nelson Rockefeller's difficult relationship with some members of the White House staff during the Ford administration. The Bushes attended a large number of public and ceremonial events in their positions, including many state funerals, which became a common joke for comedians. As the president of the Senate, Bush also stayed in contact with members of Congress and kept the president informed on occurrences on Capitol Hill.

=== First term ===
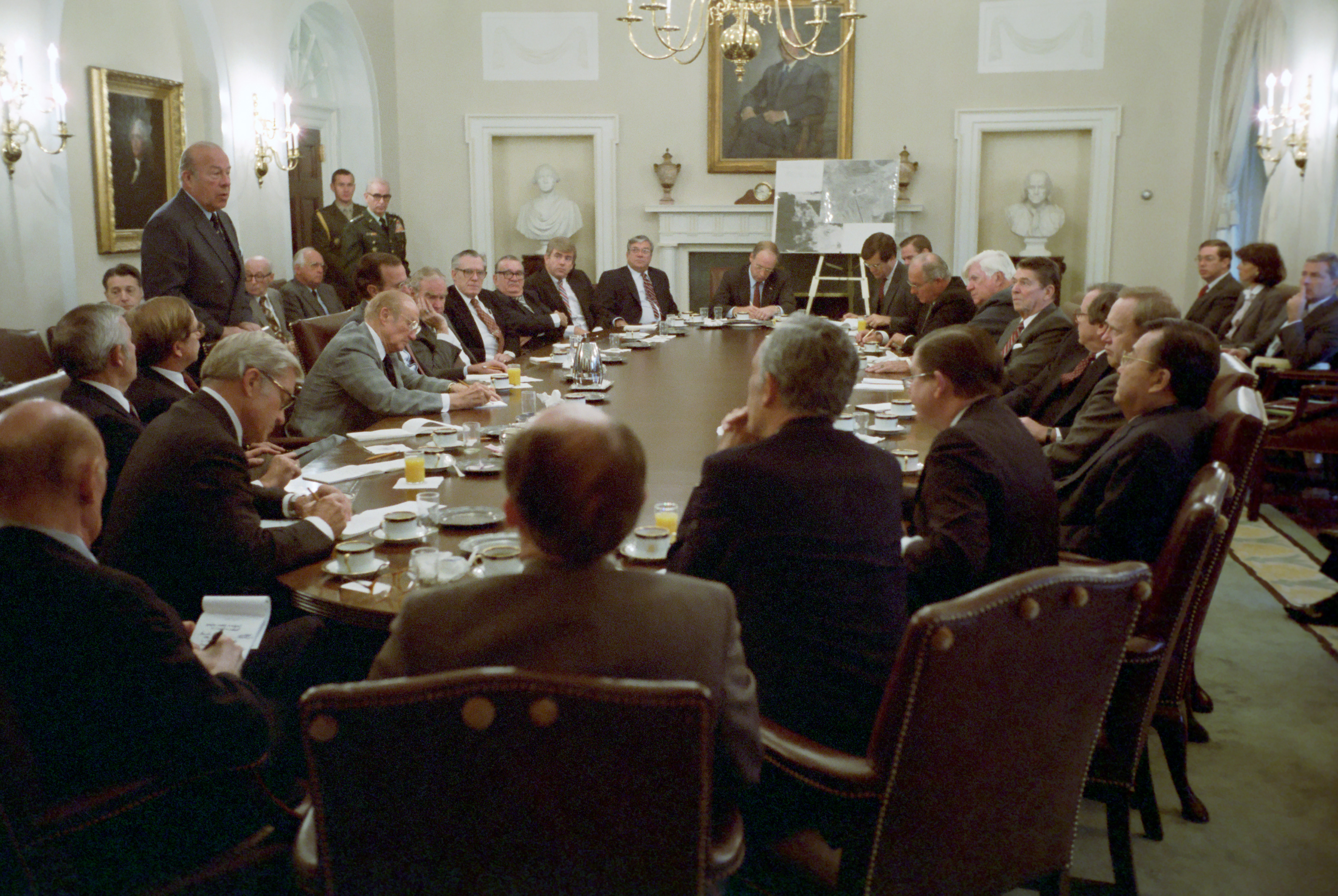
Reagan and Bush in a meeting to discuss the United States' invasion of Grenada with a group of bipartisan members of Congress in October 1983

On March 30, 1981, while Bush was in Texas, Reagan was shot and seriously wounded by John Hinckley Jr. Bush immediately flew back to Washington D.C.; when his plane landed, his aides advised him to proceed directly to the White House by helicopter to show that the government was still functioning. Bush rejected the idea, fearing that such a dramatic scene risked giving the impression that he sought to usurp Reagan's powers and prerogatives. During Reagan's short period of incapacity, Bush presided over Cabinet meetings, met with congressional and foreign leaders, and briefed reporters. Still, he consistently rejected invoking the Twenty-fifth Amendment. Bush's handling of the attempted assassination and its aftermath made a positive impression on Reagan, who recovered and returned to work within two weeks of the shooting. From then on, the two men would have regular Thursday lunches in the Oval Office.

Reagan assigned Bush to chair two special task forces, one on deregulation and one on international drug smuggling. Both were popular issues with conservatives, and Bush, largely a moderate, began courting them through his work. The deregulation task force reviewed hundreds of rules, making specific recommendations on which ones to amend or revise to curb the size of the federal government. The Reagan administration's deregulation push strongly impacted broadcasting, finance, resource extraction, and other economic activities, and the administration eliminated numerous government positions. Bush also oversaw the administration's national security crisis management organization, which had traditionally been the responsibility of the National Security Advisor. In 1983, Bush toured Western Europe as part of the Reagan administration's ultimately successful efforts to convince skeptical NATO allies to support the deployment of Pershing II missiles.

Reagan's approval ratings fell after his first year in office, but they bounced back when the United States began to emerge from recession in 1983. Former vice president Walter Mondale was nominated by the Democratic Party in the 1984 presidential election. Down in the polls, Mondale selected Congresswoman Geraldine Ferraro as his running mate in hopes of galvanizing support for his campaign, thus making Ferraro the first female major party vice presidential nominee in U.S. history. She and Bush squared off in a single televised vice presidential debate. Public opinion polling consistently showed a Reagan lead in the 1984 campaign, and Mondale was unable to shake up the race. In the end, Reagan won re-election, winning 49 of 50 states and receiving 59% of the popular vote to Mondale's 41%.

=== Second term ===
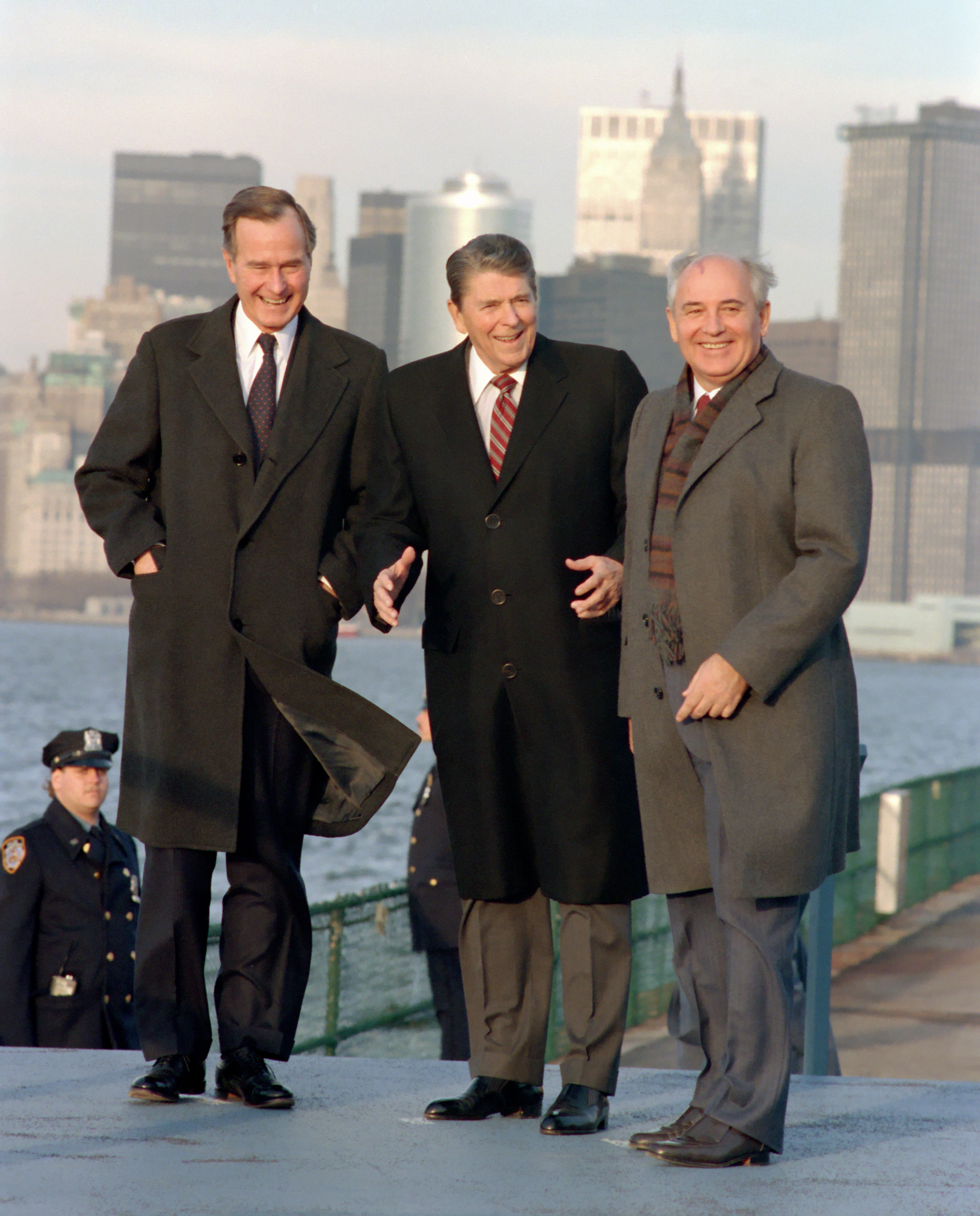
Vice President Bush standing with President Ronald Reagan and Soviet leader Mikhail Gorbachev on the New York City waterfront in 1988

Mikhail Gorbachev came to power in the Soviet Union in 1985. Rejecting the ideological rigidity of his three elderly sick predecessors, Gorbachev insisted on urgently needed economic and political reforms called "glasnost" (openness) and "perestroika" (restructuring). At the 1987 Washington Summit, Gorbachev and Reagan signed the Intermediate-Range Nuclear Forces Treaty, which committed both signatories to the total abolition of their respective short-range and medium-range missile stockpiles. The treaty began a new era of trade, openness, and cooperation between the two powers. President Reagan and Secretary of State George Shultz took the lead in these negotiations, but Bush sat in on many meetings. Bush did not agree with many of the Reagan policies, but he did tell Gorbachev that he would seek to continue improving relations if he succeeded Reagan. On July 13, 1985, Bush became the first vice president to serve as acting president when Reagan underwent surgery to remove polyps from his colon; Bush served as the acting president for approximately eight hours.

In 1986, the Reagan administration was shaken by a scandal when it was revealed that administration officials had secretly arranged weapon sales to Iran during the Iran–Iraq War. The officials had used the proceeds to fund the Contra rebels in their fight against the leftist Sandinista government in Nicaragua. Democrats had passed a law that appropriated funds could not be used to help the Contras. Instead, the administration used non-appropriated funds from the sales. When news of the affair broke to the media, Bush stated that he had been "out of the loop" and unaware of the diversion of funds. Biographer Jon Meacham writes that "no evidence was ever produced proving Bush was aware of the diversion to the contras," but he criticizes Bush's "out of the loop" characterization, writing that the "record is clear that Bush was aware that the United States, in contravention of its own stated policy, was trading arms for hostages". The Iran–Contra scandal, as it became known, did serious damage to the Reagan presidency, raising questions about Reagan's competency. Congress established the Tower Commission to investigate the scandal, and, at Reagan's request, a panel of federal judges appointed Lawrence Walsh as a special prosecutor charged with investigating the Iran–Contra scandal. The investigations continued after Reagan left office, and, though Bush was never charged with a crime, the Iran–Contra scandal would remain a political liability for him.

On July 3, 1988, the guided missile cruiser USS Vincennes accidentally shot down Iran Air Flight 655, killing 290 passengers. Bush, then-vice president, defended his country at the United Nations by arguing that the U.S. attack had been a wartime incident and the crew of Vincennes had acted appropriately to the situation.

==== 1988 presidential election ====
1988 electoral vote results. Bush won 426–111.

Bush began planning for a presidential run after the 1984 election, and he officially entered the 1988 Republican Party presidential primaries in October 1987. He put together a campaign led by Reagan staffer Lee Atwater, which also included his son, George W. Bush, and media consultant Roger Ailes. Though he had moved to the right during his time as vice president, endorsing a Human Life Amendment and repudiating his earlier comments on "voodoo economics", Bush still faced opposition from many conservatives in the Republican Party. His major rivals for the Republican nomination were Senate minority leader Bob Dole of Kansas, Representative Jack Kemp of New York, and Christian televangelist Pat Robertson. Reagan did not publicly endorse any candidate but privately expressed support for Bush.

Though considered the early front-runner for the nomination, Bush came in third in the Iowa caucus, behind Dole and Robertson. Much as Reagan had done in 1980, Bush reorganized his staff and concentrated on the New Hampshire primary. With help from Governor John H. Sununu and an effective campaign attacking Dole for raising taxes, Bush overcame an initial polling deficit and won New Hampshire with 39 percent of the vote. After Bush won South Carolina and 16 of the 17 states holding a primary on Super Tuesday, his competitors dropped out of the race.

Bush, occasionally criticized for his lack of eloquence compared to Reagan, delivered a well-received speech at the Republican convention. Known as the "thousand points of light" speech, it described Bush's vision of America: he endorsed the Pledge of Allegiance, prayer in schools, capital punishment, and gun rights. Bush also pledged that he would not raise taxes, stating: "Congress will push me to raise taxes, and I'll say no, and they'll push, and I'll say no, and they'll push again. And all I can say to them is: read my lips. No new taxes." Bush selected little-known Senator Dan Quayle of Indiana as his running mate. Though Quayle had compiled an unremarkable record in Congress, he was popular among many conservatives, and the campaign hoped that Quayle's youth would appeal to younger voters.

President Reagan greets President-elect Bush at the White House; November 9, 1988.

Meanwhile, the Democratic Party nominated Governor Michael Dukakis, known for presiding over an economic turnaround in Massachusetts. Leading in the general election polls against Bush, Dukakis ran an ineffective, low-risk campaign. The Bush campaign attacked Dukakis as an unpatriotic liberal extremist and seized on the Willie Horton case, in which a convicted felon from Massachusetts raped a woman while on a prison furlough, a program Dukakis supported as governor. The Bush campaign charged that Dukakis presided over a "revolving door" that allowed dangerous convicted felons to leave prison. Dukakis damaged his own campaign with a widely mocked ride in an M1 Abrams tank and poor performance at the second presidential debate. Bush also attacked Dukakis for opposing a law that would require all students to recite the Pledge of Allegiance. The election is widely considered to have had a high level of negative campaigning, though political scientist John Geer has argued that the share of negative ads was in line with previous presidential elections.

Bush defeated Dukakis by a margin of 426 to 111 in the Electoral College, and he took 53.4% of the national popular vote. Bush ran well in all the major regions of the country, but especially in the South. He became the fourth sitting vice president to be elected president and the first to do so since Martin Van Buren in 1836 and the first person to succeed a president from his own party via election since Herbert Hoover in 1929. (Note: The 1988 presidential election remains the only presidential election since 1948 in which either party won a third consecutive term.) In the concurrent congressional elections, Democrats retained control of both houses of Congress.

== Elections during the Bush vice presidency ==
Congressional party leaders
		Senate leaders		House leaders	
Congress	Year	Majority	Minority	Speaker	Minority
97th	1981–1982	Baker	Byrd	O'Neill	Michel
98th	1983–1984	Baker	Byrd	O'Neill	Michel
99th	1985–1986	Dole	Byrd	O'Neill	Michel
100th	1987–1988	Byrd	Dole	Wright	Michel
101st (Note: 17 days of the 97th Congress (January 3, 1981 – January 19, 1981) took place under Vice President Mondale, and 17 days of the 101st Congress (January 3, 1989 – January 19, 1989) took place during Bush's vice presidency.)	1989	Mitchell	Dole	Wright	Michel

Republican seats in Congress
Congress	Senate	House
97th	53–54	192
98th	54–55	166
99th	53	182
100th	45–46	177
101st	45	175

== See also ==
- Presidency of Ronald Reagan
- Electoral history of George H. W. Bush
