= Bush presidential campaign =

Bush presidential campaign may refer to any of the following presidential campaigns conducted by members of the Bush family:

- George H. W. Bush 1980 presidential campaign, an unsuccessful primary campaign for the Republican nomination that resulted in him being selected as Ronald Reagan's running mate and elected the 43rd vice president of the United States
- George H. W. Bush 1988 presidential campaign, a successful election campaign resulting in him being elected the 41st president of the United States
- George H. W. Bush 1992 presidential campaign, an unsuccessful re-election campaign
- George W. Bush 2000 presidential campaign, a successful election campaign resulting in him being elected the 43rd president of the United States
- George W. Bush 2004 presidential campaign, a successful re-election campaign
- Jeb Bush 2016 presidential campaign, an unsuccessful primary campaign for the Republican nomination
