= 1980 New Hampshire Republican presidential primary =

- February 26, 1980
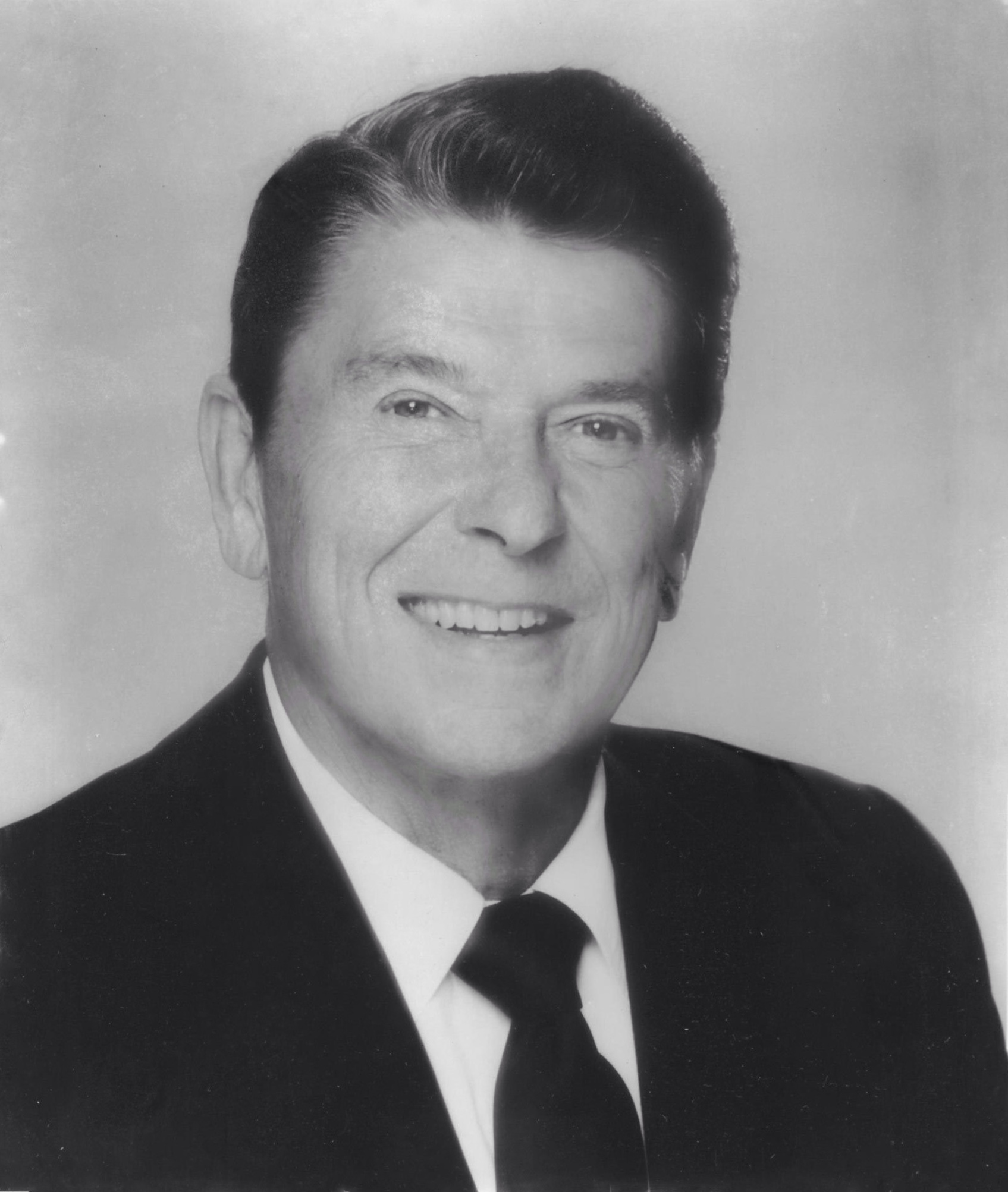

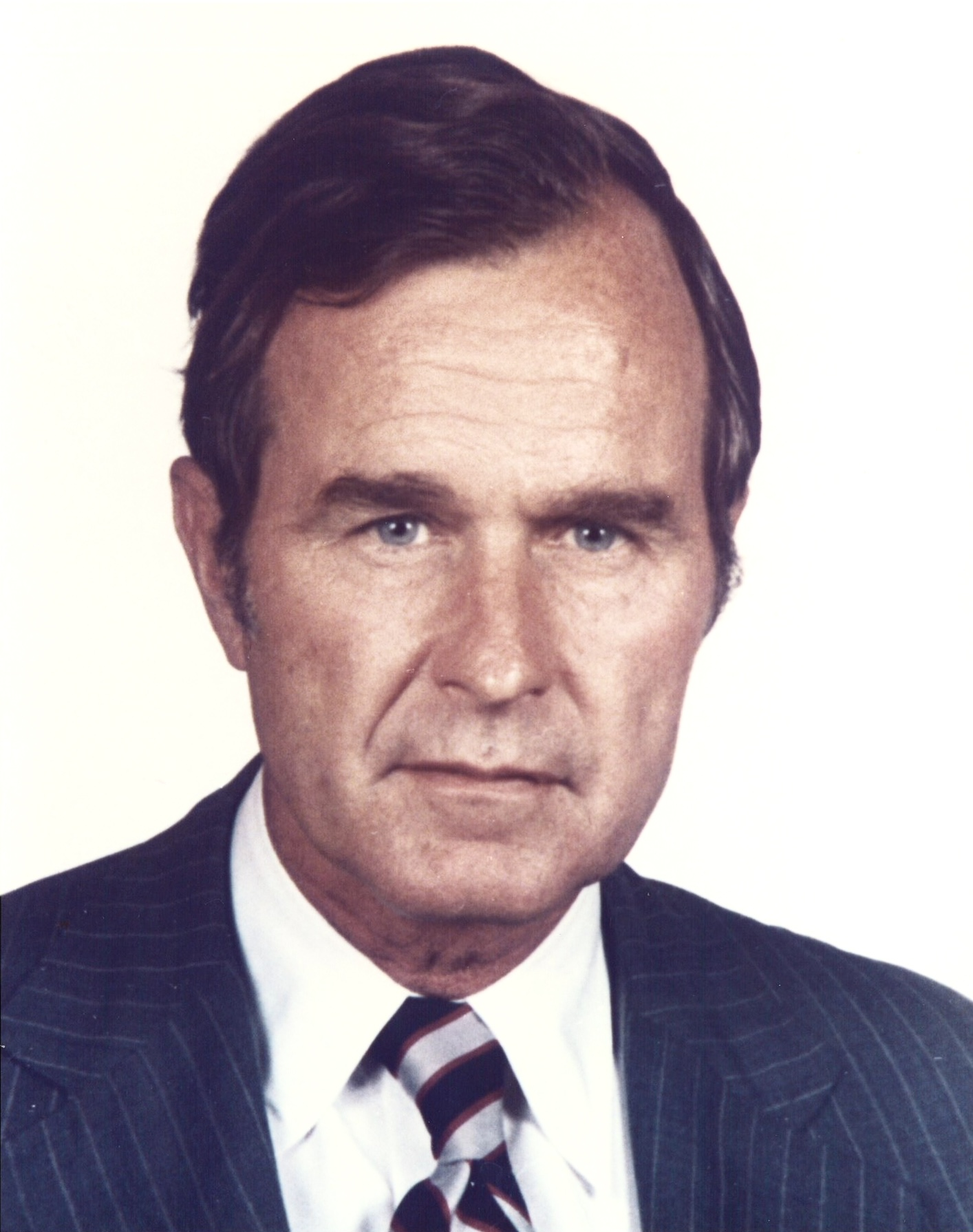

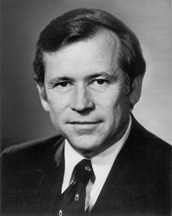

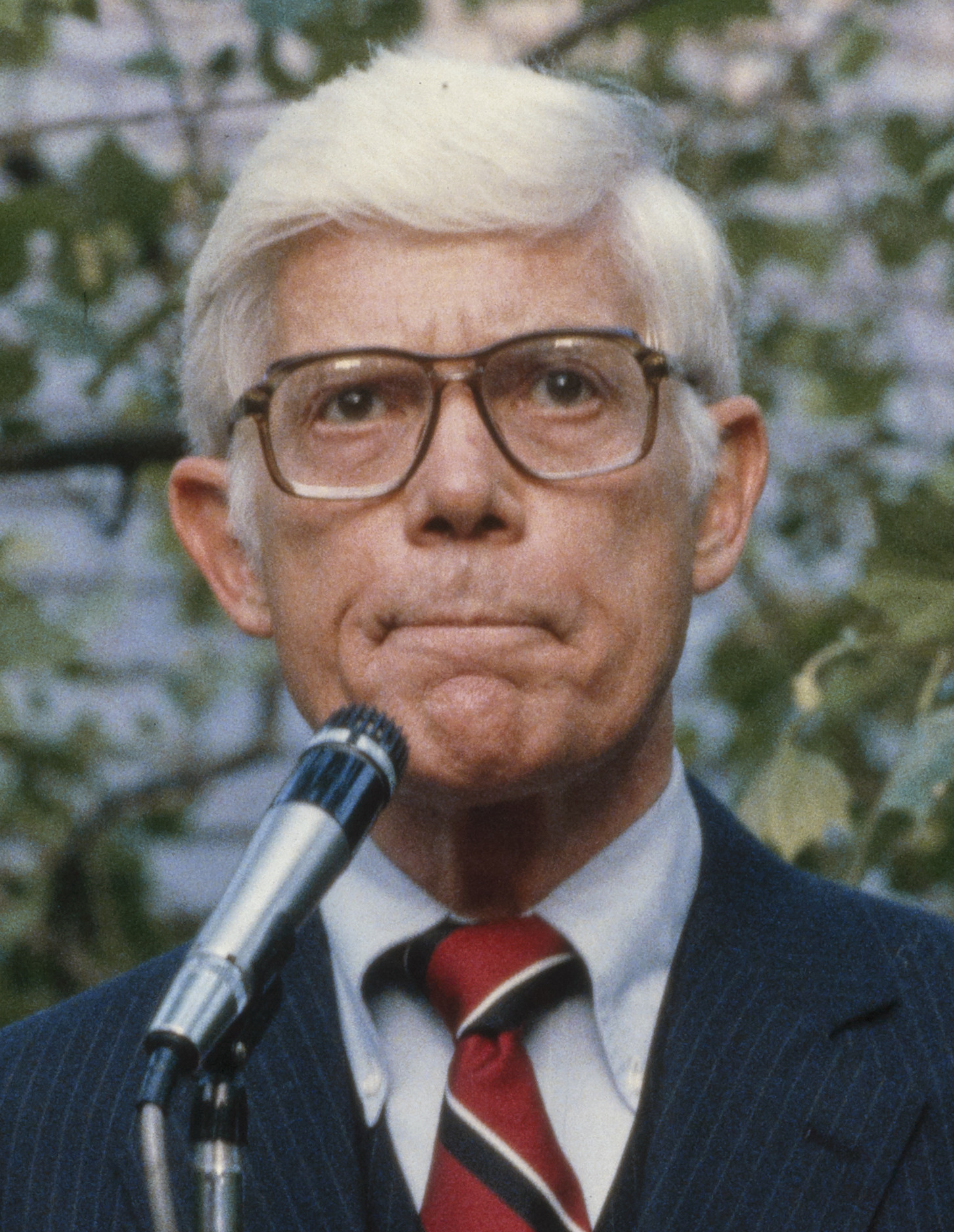
Candidate	Ronald Reagan	George H. W. Bush
Home state	California	Texas
Delegate count	15	5
Popular vote	72,983	33,443
Percentage	50.2%	23.0%
Candidate	Howard Baker	John B. Anderson
Home state	Tennessee	Illinois
Delegate count	2
Popular vote	18,943	14,458
Percentage	13.0%	10.0%

Reagan: 30-40% 40-50% 50-60% 60-70%
Reagan Bush	Baker Tie	No vote

The 1980 New Hampshire Republican presidential primary was held on February 26, 1980, in New Hampshire as one of the Republican Party's statewide nomination contests ahead of the 1980 United States presidential election.

Despite having recently lost the Iowa caucuses in a shocking upset, Ronald Reagan claimed a landslide victory, securing a majority of the vote and a 27 percentage point victory over his next closest opponent, George H. W. Bush. Behind them, Howard Baker of Tennessee finished 3rd, and John Anderson of Illinois finished 4th.
