= 1980 Alabama Republican presidential primary =

State selection of Republican US presidential candidate

- March 11, 1980

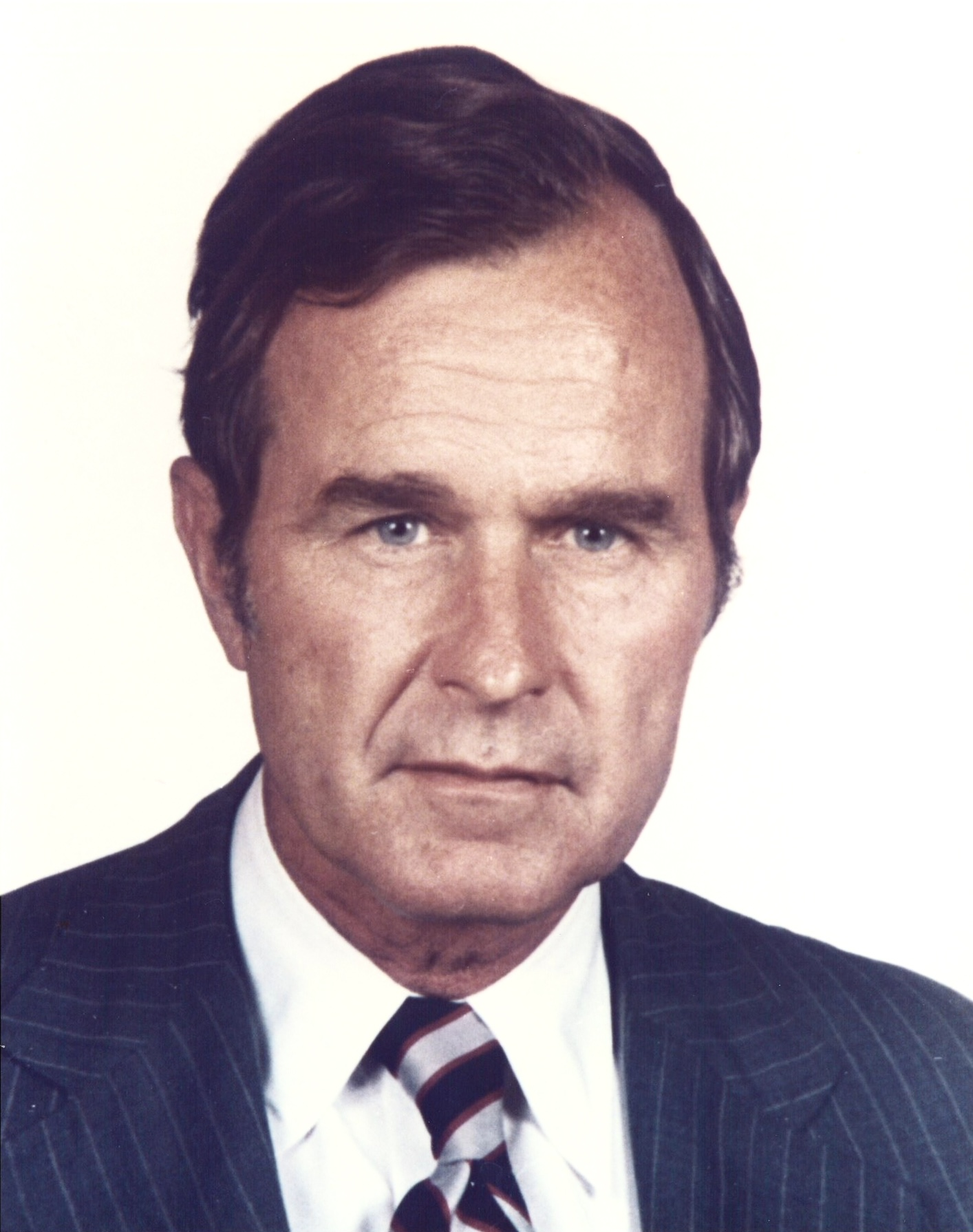
Candidate	Ronald Reagan	George H. W. Bush
Home state	California	Texas
Delegate count	18	9
Popular vote	147,352	54,730
Percentage	66.4%	24.7%

The 1980 Alabama Republican presidential primary was held on March 11, 1980, to select 27 delegates to represent Alabama in the 1980 Republican National Convention. The primary was held as part of the national 1980 Republican Party presidential primaries.

== Candidates ==
Eight candidates appeared on the ballot statewide.

- Howard Baker, U.S. Senator from Tennessee (withdrawn)
- Nick Belluso, businessman
- George H. W. Bush, former U.S. representative
- John Connally, former Governor of Texas (withdrawn)
- Phil Crane, U.S. representative
- Bob Dole, U.S. Senator from Kansas
- Harold Stassen, former Governor of Minnesota and perennial candidate
- Ronald Reagan, former Governor of California

== Results ==
Alabama Republican primary, March 11, 1980
Candidate	Votes	Percentage	Delegates
Candidate	Votes	Percentage	Total
Ronald Reagan	147,352	66.44%	18
George H. W. Bush	54,730	24.66%	9
Phil Crane	5,099	2.30%	0
Howard Baker	1,963	0.89%	0
John Connally	1,077	0.49%	0
Harold Stassen	544	0.24%	0
Bob Dole	447	0.20%	0
Nick Belluso	141	0.06%	0
Total:	221,353	100.00%	27
