= George H. W. Bush 1980 presidential campaign =

First political campaign for president of George H. W. Bush

- Campaign: 1980 Republican primaries 1980 U.S. presidential election
- Candidate: George H. W. Bush, 11th Director of Central Intelligence (1976–1977)
- Affiliation: Republican Party
- Status: Announced, May 1, 1979; Withdrew, May 26, 1980
- Headquarters: Washington, D.C.
- Key people: James Baker, campaign manager Barber Conable, head of steering committee
- Slogan: A President We Won't Have to Train

The 1980 presidential campaign of George H. W. Bush began when he announced he was running for the Republican Party's nomination in the 1980 United States presidential election, on May 1, 1979, after over 16 months of speculation as to when or whether he would run. At the outset of the primaries in 1980, Bush won the Iowa caucuses, but only won seven other primary contests, the rest being swept by Ronald Reagan. Bush withdrew on May 26, 1980, and later that year was selected by Reagan to be the Republican vice-presidential candidate, in a successful electoral bid that ultimately led to Bush's election as president in the 1988 United States presidential election.

== Background ==
Prior to his candidacy, Bush had held a number of elected and appointed offices, most recently serving as the 11th Director of Central Intelligence Agency. Bush's tenure at the CIA ended after Jimmy Carter narrowly defeated Gerald Ford in the 1976 presidential election. Out of public office for the first time since the 1960s, Bush became chairman on the executive committee of the First International Bank in Houston. He also spent a year as a part-time professor of Administrative Science at Rice University's Jones School of Business, continued his membership in the Council on Foreign Relations, and joined the Trilateral Commission. Meanwhile, he began to lay the groundwork for his candidacy in the 1980 Republican Party presidential primaries, noting as early as December 1977 that he was "interested" in pursuing the 1980 Republican presidential nomination.

== Campaign ==
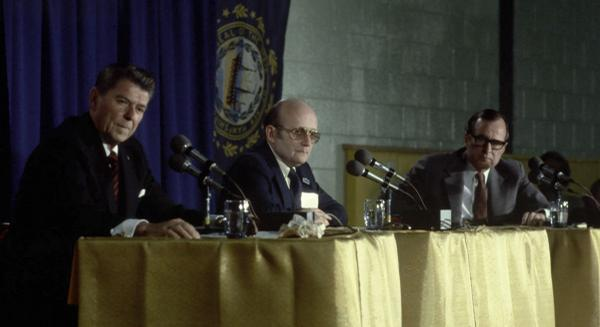
Ronald Reagan, moderator Jon Breen, and Bush participate in the Nashua, New Hampshire, presidential debate, 1980

Bush ended the campaign winning six states, along with the District of Columbia and Puerto Rico (not pictured).

In the 1980 Republican primary campaign, Bush faced Ronald Reagan, who was widely regarded as the front-runner, as well as other contenders like Senator Bob Dole, Senator Howard Baker, Texas Governor John Connally, Congressman Phil Crane, and Congressman John B. Anderson. The Bush campaign acknowledged that Reagan and Connally were considered the early front-runners, and that Bush intended to "do as well as possible in the early primaries, and hope to pick up additional support if and when one of the front-runners falters".

=== Announcement and themes ===
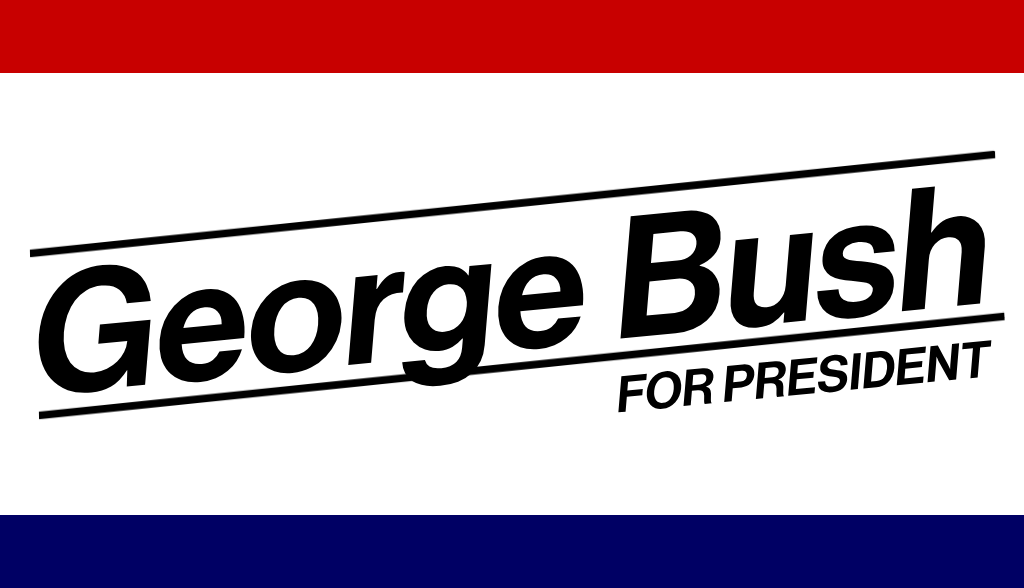
Campaign alternate logo

Bush officially announced his candidacy in a speech on the morning of May 1, 1979, criticizing "tax and spend" policies which he broadly attributed to the Democratic Party, while not mentioning President Carter by name. Bush's campaign cast him as a youthful, "thinking man's candidate" who would emulate the pragmatic conservatism of President Eisenhower. Amid the Afghan–Soviet War, which brought an end to a period of détente, and the Iran hostage crisis, in which 52 Americans were taken hostage, the campaign also highlighted Bush's foreign policy experience.

=== Primaries ===
Reagan's campaign director John Sears deciding to capitalize on Reagan's initial polling lead with an "above the fray" strategy. While Reagan did not attend many of the multi-candidate forums and straw polls in the summer and fall of 1979, Bush did go to all the so-called "cattle calls", and began to come in first at a number of these events. At the outset of the race, Bush focused heavily on winning the January 21 Iowa caucuses, making 31 visits to the state. He won a close victory in Iowa with 31.5% to Reagan's 29.4%, which "surprised most observers". After the win, Bush stated that his campaign was full of momentum, or "the Big Mo", and Reagan reorganized his campaign.

Reagan boycotted the Puerto Rico primary in deference to New Hampshire, allowing Bush to win the territory easily, giving him an early lead going into New Hampshire. Partly in response to the Bush campaign's frequent questioning of Reagan's age (Reagan turned 69 in 1980), the Reagan campaign stepped up attacks on Bush, painting him as an elitist who was not truly committed to conservatism. Prior to the New Hampshire primary, Bush and Reagan agreed to a two-person debate, organized by The Nashua Telegraph but paid for by the Reagan campaign. Days before the debate, Reagan announced that he would invite four other candidates to the debate; Bush, who had hoped that the one-on-one debate would allow him to emerge as the main alternative to Reagan in the primaries, refused to debate the other candidates. All six candidates took the stage, but Bush refused to speak in the presence of the other candidates. At the beginning of the debate, Reagan was interrupting the debate moderator, Jon Breen, who was attempting to ask the first debate question, for Reagan to announce his intention of including the other four candidates. As Reagan tried to explain his intention, Breen asked Bob Malloy, the volume operator, to mute Reagan's microphone. When Malloy did not do so, Breen repeated his request in muting Reagan's microphone. Reagan angrily retaliated by shouting, "I am paying for this microphone, Mr. Green! [sic]". (Note: Reagan misstated Breen's last name as "Mr. Green") Ultimately, the other four candidates left the stage, and the debate continued, but Bush's refusal to debate anyone other than Reagan badly damaged his campaign in New Hampshire. He decisively lost New Hampshire's primary to Reagan, winning just 23 percent of the vote.

Bush revitalized his campaign with a victory in Massachusetts but lost the next several primaries. As Reagan built up a commanding delegate lead, Bush refused to end his campaign, but the other candidates dropped out of the race. Criticizing his more conservative rival's policy proposals, Bush famously labeled Reagan's supply side-influenced plans for massive tax cuts as "voodoo economics". Though he favored lower taxes, Bush feared that dramatic reductions in taxation would lead to deficits and, in turn, cause inflation. As the race dragged on and Reagan's delegate lead became increasingly insurmountable, journalist Nicholas von Hoffman published an op-ed sarcastically accusing Bush of trying to physically weary a "tired" Reagan by forcing the older candidate to continue campaigning after the outcome of race was no longer in serious doubt. The following day, Bush withdrew his candidacy and endorsed Reagan, urging his convention delegates to support Reagan. Bush blamed the failure of his campaign on the media having written about the campaign as if Reagan's victory was a foregone conclusion, dampening Bush's ability to engage in needed fundraising.

Ultimately, Bush won eight primary contests, of which six were states, in Iowa (January 21), Puerto Rico (February 17), Massachusetts (March 4), Connecticut (March 25), Maine (April 19), Pennsylvania (April 22), Washington, D.C. (May 6), and Michigan (May 20). His campaign spent $16.2 million, and ended with $300,000 in debt.

The Reagan–Bush ticket won the 1980 presidential election with 50.7% of the popular vote and a large majority of the electoral vote.

=== Major endorsements ===
- Francis W. Hatch Jr. of Massachusetts, former state representative
- Henry Cabot Lodge Jr. of Massachusetts, former senator, ambassador and 1960 Republican Vice-Presidential nominee
- Elliot Richardson of Massachusetts, former United States Attorney General and Commerce Secretary
- William B. Saxbe of Ohio, former senator and U.S. Attorney General
- Robert Taft Jr. of Ohio, former senator

=== National polls ===
Over the course of the campaign, polls were periodically conducted by Gallup, Inc. Throughout the race, Bush never led in the polls, and was often in single digits, and was often in fifth place or worse. Bush had his best polling outcome after winning the Iowa caucuses in late January, at which time Bush polled at 28%, with Reagan polling at 29%. By February, Reagan's lead had again widened.

Publication date	John Anderson	Howard Baker	George Bush	John Connally	Bob Dole	Gerald Ford	Ronald Reagan	Others
July 1978	–	9%	1%	5%	4%	37%	31%	5%
Dec. 1978	1%	9%	1%	6%	1%	24%	40%	11%
Apr. 1979	2%	8%	1%	12%	1%	26%	31%	11%
May 1979	–	10%	–	8%	3%	27%	28%	–
June 1979	0%	11%	0%	5%	0%	29%	37%	5%
July 1979	3%	11%	1%	9%	2%	27%	32%	15%
Aug. 1979	1%	10%	3%	8%	1%	21%	29%	16%
Nov. 1979	1%	14%	2%	10%	3%	22%	33%	15%
Nov. 1979	0%	11%	5%	8%	3%	24%	40%	—
Dec. 1979	1%	9%	7%	10%	4%	18%	40%	10%
Jan. 1980	3%	9%	9%	9%	0%	27%	33%	—
Jan. 1980	0%	6%	28%	7%	0%	18%	29%	—
Feb. 1980	2%	6%	17%	4%	1%	32%	34%	3%
Feb. 1980	3%	7%	16%	–	–	25%	44%	—

== Aftermath ==
1980 Republican Party Ticket
- Campaign: U.S. presidential–vice-presidential election, 1980
- Candidate: George H. W. Bush (vice-presidential); Director of Central Intelligence, 1976–1977
- Affiliation: Republican Party
- Status: Official VP nominee: July 17, 1980; Elected VP: November 4, 1980; Inaugurated VP: January 20, 1981

=== Reagan–Bush ticket ===
After Reagan clinched a majority of delegates in late May, Bush reluctantly dropped out of the race. At the 1980 Republican National Convention, Reagan made the last-minute decision to select Bush as his vice presidential nominee after negotiations with Ford regarding a Reagan–Ford ticket collapsed. Though Reagan had resented many of the Bush campaign's attacks during the primary campaign, and several conservative leaders had actively opposed Bush's nomination, Reagan ultimately decided that Bush's popularity with moderate Republicans made him the best and safest pick. Bush, who had believed his political career might be over following the primaries, eagerly accepted the position and threw himself into campaigning for the Reagan–Bush ticket.

The 1980 general election campaign between Reagan and Carter was conducted amid a multitude of domestic concerns and the ongoing Iran hostage crisis, and Reagan sought to focus the race on Carter's handling of the economy. Though the race was widely regarded as a close contest for most of the campaign, Reagan ultimately won over the large majority of undecided voters. Reagan took 50.7 percent of the popular vote and 489 of the 538 electoral votes, while Carter won 41% of the popular vote and John Anderson, running as an independent candidate, won 6.6% of the popular vote. Bush served as vice-president for eight years, and was himself elected president in 1988.

== See also ==
- 1980 Republican Party presidential primaries
- 1980 Republican Party vice presidential candidate selection
- 1980 Republican National Convention
- 1980 United States presidential election
- George H. W. Bush 1988 presidential campaign
- George H. W. Bush 1992 presidential campaign
