= 1980 Republican Party presidential primaries =

Selection of Republican US presidential candidate

- January 21 to June 28, 1980

1,990 delegates to the Republican National Convention 996 (majority) votes needed to win

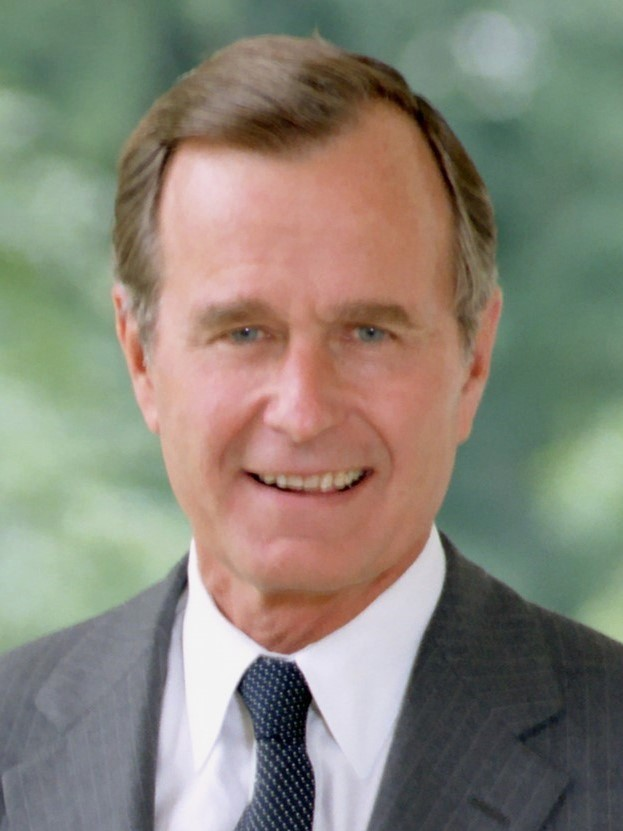

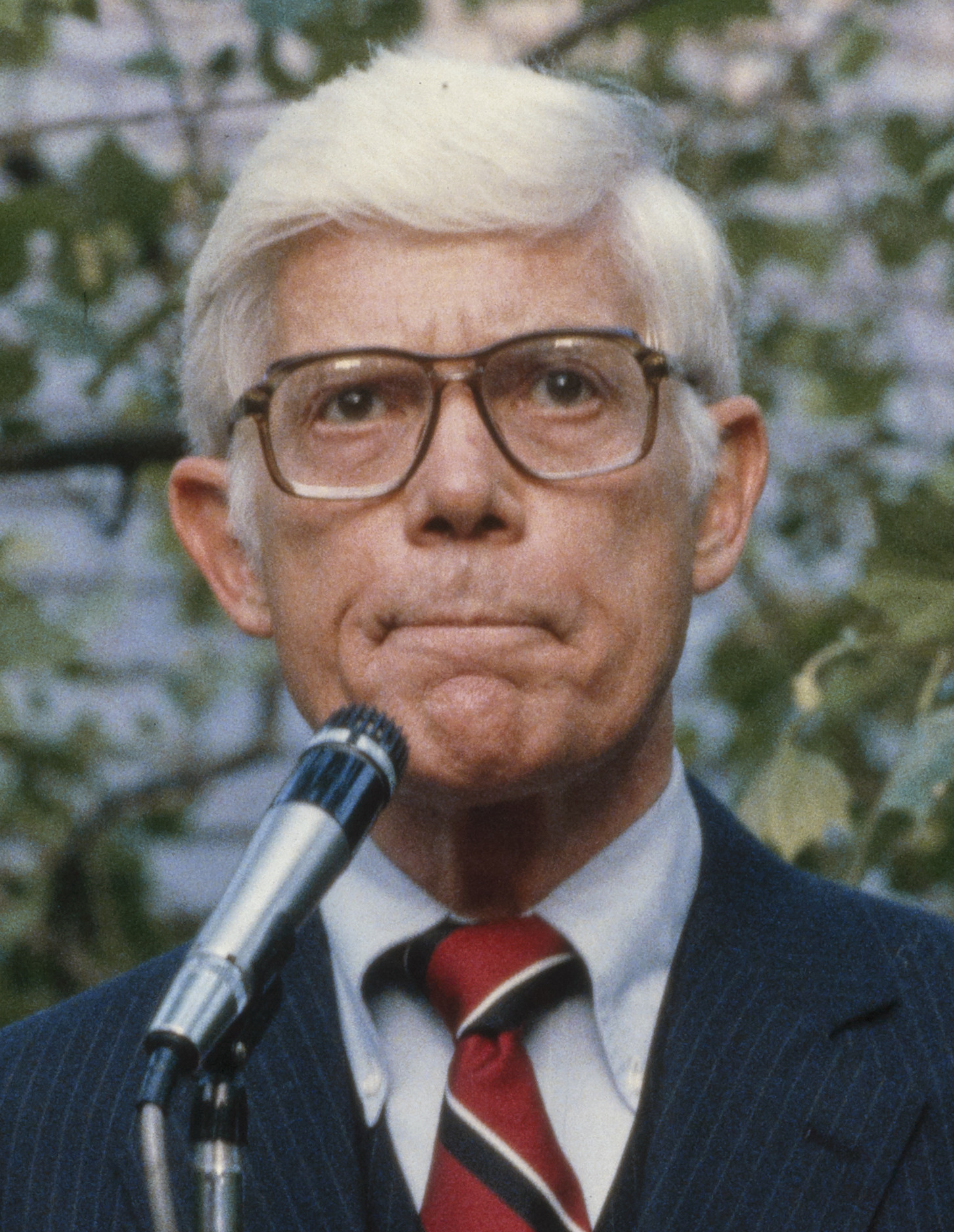
Candidate	Ronald Reagan	George H. W. Bush	John B. Anderson
Home state	California	Texas	Illinois
Delegate count	1,407	250	59
Contests won	42	9	0
Popular vote	7,709,793	3,070,033	1,572,174
Percentage	59.79%	23.81%	12.19%
- Reagan Bush Uncommitted
Previous Republican nominee
Gerald Ford
Republican nominee
Ronald Reagan

From January 21 to June 28, 1980, voters of the Republican Party chose its nominee for president in the 1980 United States presidential election. Retired Hollywood actor and two-term California governor Ronald Reagan was selected as the nominee through a series of primary elections and caucuses culminating in the Republican National Convention held from July 14 to 17, 1980, in Detroit, Michigan. This was the last Republican primary which featured the nominee choosing a fellow candidate as his running mate.

== Background ==
As the 1980 presidential election approached, incumbent Democratic president Jimmy Carter appeared vulnerable. High gas prices, economic stagflation, a renewed Cold War with the Soviet Union following the invasion of Afghanistan, and the Iran hostage crisis that developed when Iranian students seized the American embassy in Tehran all contributed to a general dissatisfaction with Carter's presidency; his job approval rating sank to below 30 percent in late-1979 as a result. Consequently, the president faced stiff Democratic primary challenges from Massachusetts Senator Ted Kennedy and California Governor Jerry Brown.A large field of Republican challengers also emerged.

== Candidates ==
=== Nominee ===
Candidate	Most recent office	Home state	Campaign Withdrawal date	Popular vote	Contests won	Running mate
Ronald Reagan	Governor of California (1967–1975)	California	(Campaign • Positions); Secured nomination: May 24, 1980	7,709,793 (59.79%)	42	George Bush

=== Withdrew during primaries ===
Candidate	Most recent office	Home state	Campaign Withdrawal date	Popular vote	Contests won
George H. W. Bush	Director of Central Intelligence Agency (1976–1977)	Texas	Campaign; Withdrew: May 26 (endorsed Ronald Reagan, who later chose Bush as his vice presidential running-mate)	3,070,033 (23.81%)	9 CT, DC, DE, IA, ME, MA, MI, PA, PR
John Anderson	U.S. Representative from Illinois (1961–1981)	Illinois	Withdrew: April 24 (ran as independent)	1,572,174 (12.19%)	None
Phil Crane	U.S. Representative from Illinois (1969–2005)	Illinois	Withdrew: April 17 (endorsed Ronald Reagan)	97,793 (0.76%)	None
Ben Fernandez	Special Envoy to Paraguay (1973)	California	Withdrew: March 30 (endorsed Ronald Reagan)	25,520 (0.20%)	None
Bob Dole	U.S. Senator from Kansas (1969–1996)	Kansas	Withdrew: March 15 (endorsed Ronald Reagan)	7,204 (0.06%)	None
John Connally	Secretary of the Treasury (1971–1972)	Texas	Withdrew: March 9 (endorsed Ronald Reagan)	82,625 (0.64%)	None
Howard Baker	U.S. Senator from Tennessee (1967–1985)	Tennessee	Withdrew: March 5 (endorsed Ronald Reagan)	181,153 (1.41%)	None
Harold Stassen	Director of the Foreign Operations Administration (1953–1955)	Pennsylvania	Withdrew: February 26	25,425 (0.20%)	None

=== Withdrew before primaries ===
Candidate	Most recent office	Home state	Campaign Withdrawal date
Larry Pressler	U.S. Senator from South Dakota (1979–1997)	South Dakota	January 8, 1980
Lowell Weicker	U.S. Senator from Connecticut (1971–1989)	Connecticut	May 16, 1979

=== Declined to run ===
Jesse Helms	Richard Schweiker	Jim Thompson	Bill Simon	Jack Kemp	Anne L. Armstrong	Elliot Richardson	Alexander Haig	Gerald Ford
U.S. Senator from North Carolina (1973–2003)	U.S. Senator from Pennsylvania (1969–1981)	Governor of Illinois (1977–1991)	United States Secretary of the Treasury (1974–1977)	U.S. Representative from New York (1971–1989)	U.S. Ambassador to the United Kingdom (1976–1977)	United States Secretary of Commerce (1976–1977)	Supreme Allied Commander Europe (1974–1979)	U.S. President from Michigan (1974–1977)
November 8, 1978	January 5, 1979 (Endorsed Ronald Reagan)	January 23, 1979	March 6, 1979 (Endorsed Ronald Reagan)	September 28, 1979	Post-September 30, 1979 (Note: Never announced a clear declination on running)	October 16, 1979	December 22, 1979	March 15, 1980

=== Speculated candidates ===
The following potential candidates were considered possible candidates to run for the Republican nomination in 1980 by the media, but never stated a preference for or against running.

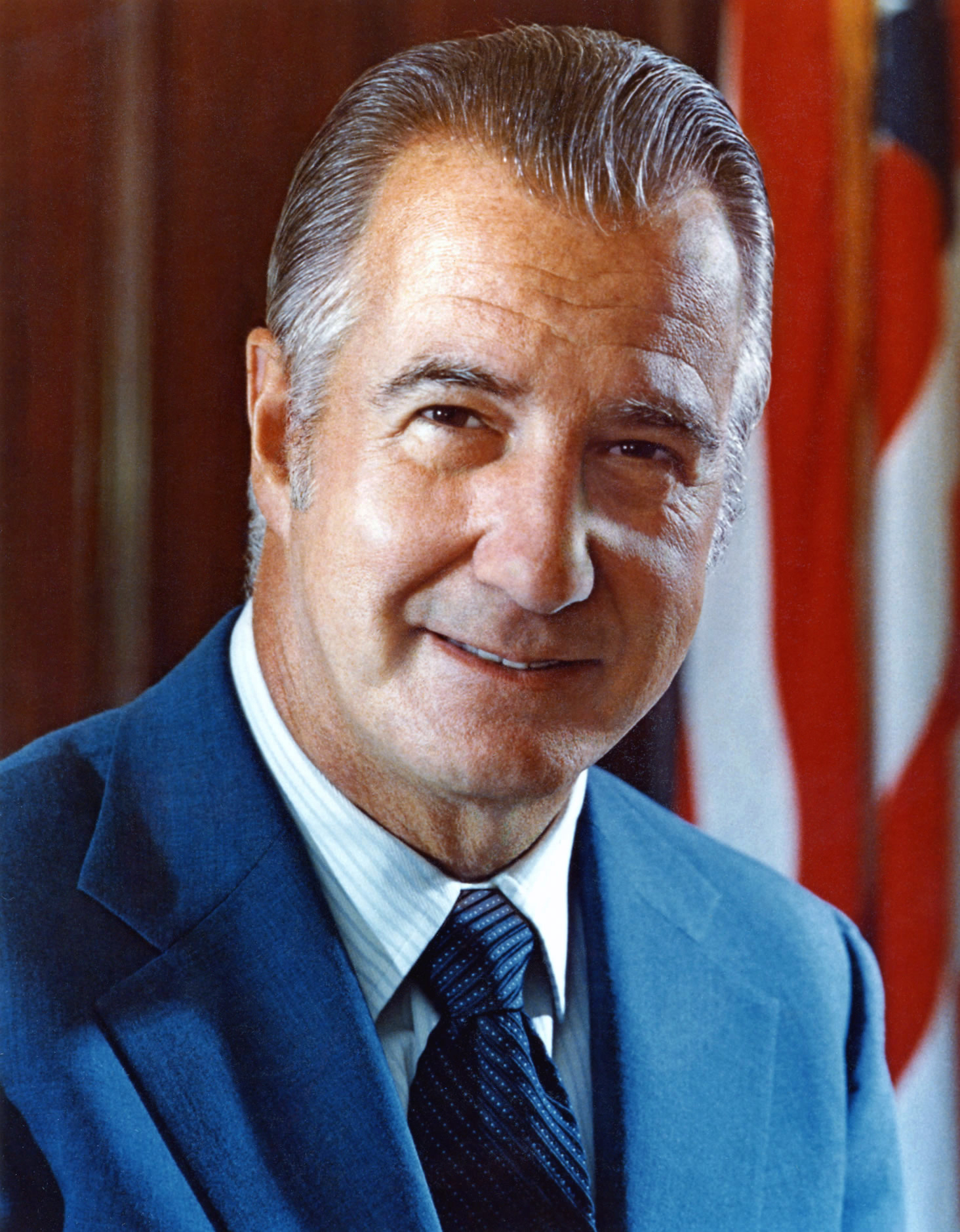
Spiro Agnew, former Vice President of the United States

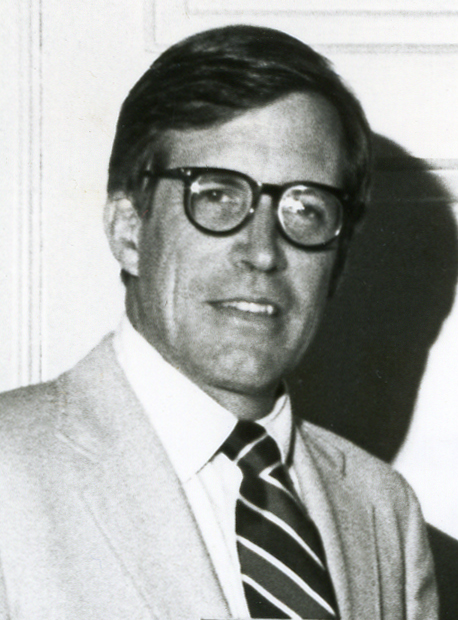
Pete du Pont, Governor of Delaware

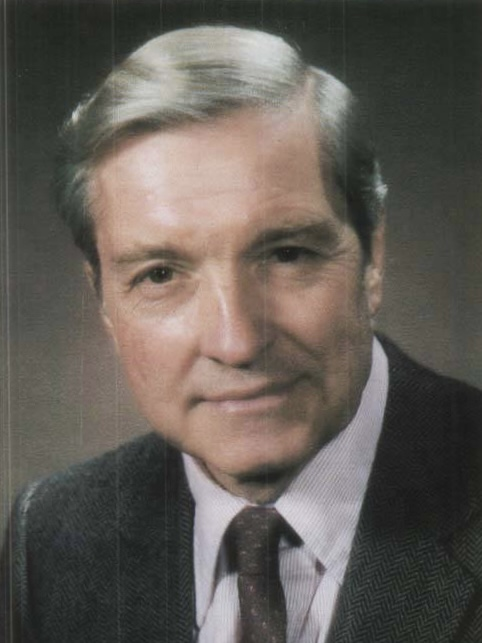
Charles Percy, Senator from Illinois

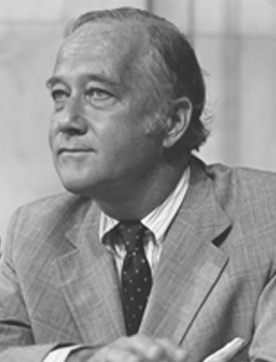
Charles Mathias, Senator from Maryland

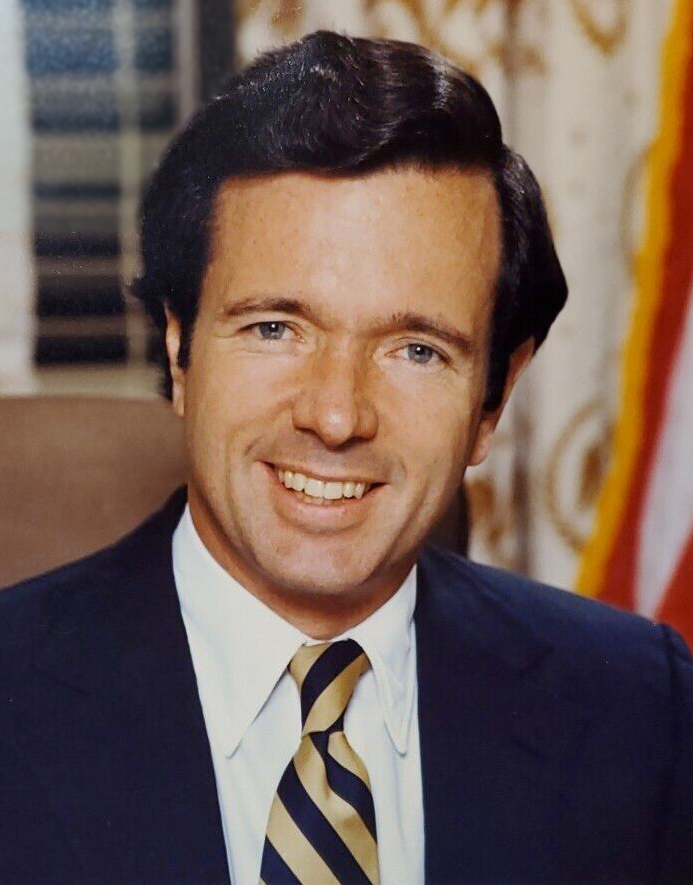
John Heinz, Senator from Pennsylvania

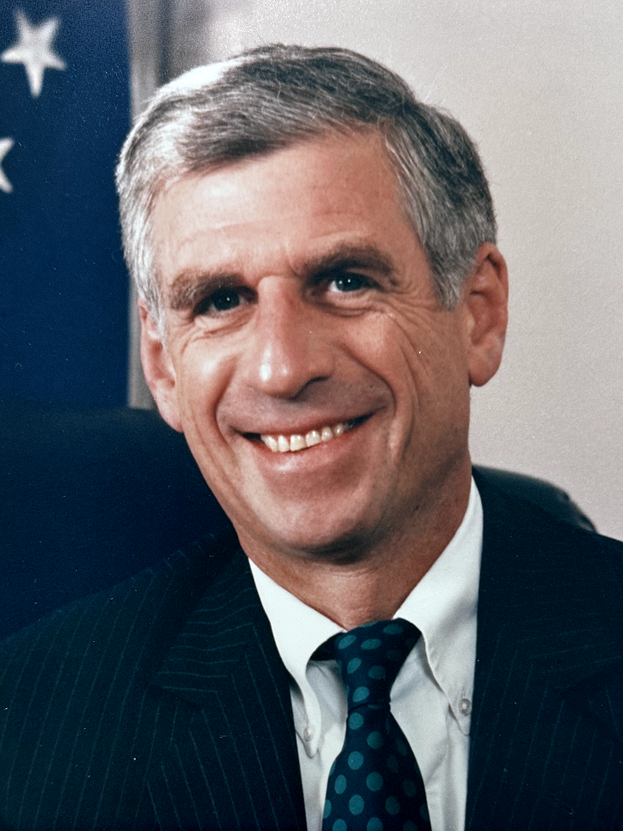
John Danforth, Senator from Missouri

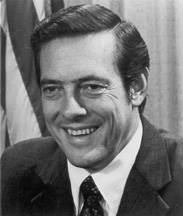
Bill Brock, RNC Chairman of Tennessee; former Senator from Tennessee

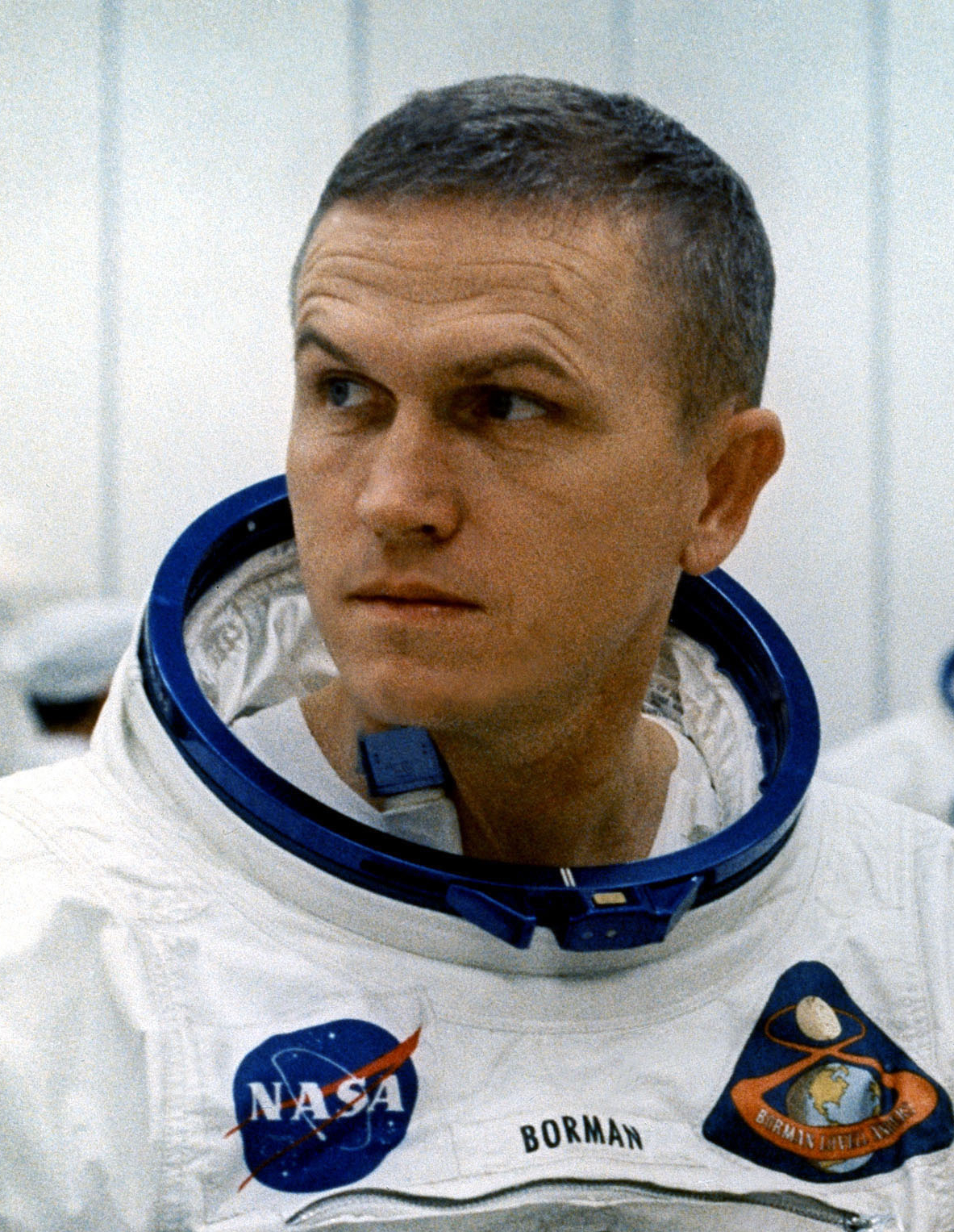
Frank Borman, former astronaut from Indiana and CEO of Eastern Air Lines

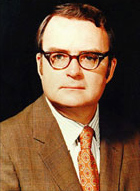
William Ruckelshaus, former Director of the Federal Bureau of Investigation

== Polling ==
=== National polling ===
Poll source	Publication date	John Anderson	Howard Baker	George Bush	John Connally	Bob Dole	Gerald Ford	Ronald Reagan	Others
Gallup	Aug. 1977	–	8%	–	–	–	20%	33%	3%
Gallup	Apr. 1978	–	11%	–	4%	4%	40%	30%	4%
Gallup	July 1978	–	9%	1%	5%	4%	37%	31%	5%
Gallup	Dec. 1978	1%	9%	1%	6%	1%	24%	40%	11% (Note: Including 1% for Phil Crane.)
Gallup	Apr. 1979	2%	8%	1%	12%	1%	26%	31%	11% (Note: Including 2% for Phil Crane.)
Gallup	May 1979	–	10%	–	8%	3%	27%	28%	–
Gallup	June 1979	0%	11%	0%	5%	0%	29%	37%	5%
Gallup	July 1979	3%	11%	1%	9%	2%	27%	32%	15% (Note: Including 2% for Phil Crane.)
Gallup	Aug. 1979	1%	10%	3%	8%	1%	21%	29%	16% (Note: Including 1% each for Phil Crane, Benjamin Fernandez, and Harold Stassen.)
Gallup	Nov. 1979	1%	14%	2%	10%	3%	22%	33%	15% (Note: Including 1% each for Phil Crane, Benjamin Fernandez, and Harold Stassen.)
Gallup	Nov. 1979	0%	11%	5%	8%	3%	24%	40%	—
Gallup	Dec. 1979	1%	9%	7%	10%	4%	18%	40%	10% (Note: Including 1% each for Phil Crane, Benjamin Fernandez, and Harold Stassen.)
Gallup	Jan. 1980	3%	9%	9%	9%	0%	27%	33%	—
Gallup	Jan. 1980	0%	6%	28%	7%	0%	18%	29%	—
Gallup	Feb. 1980	2%	6%	17%	4%	1%	32%	34%	3% (Note: 1% each for Phil Crane, Benjamin Fernandez, and Harold Stassen.)
Gallup	Feb. 1980	3%	7%	16%	–	–	25%	44%	—

== Primary race ==
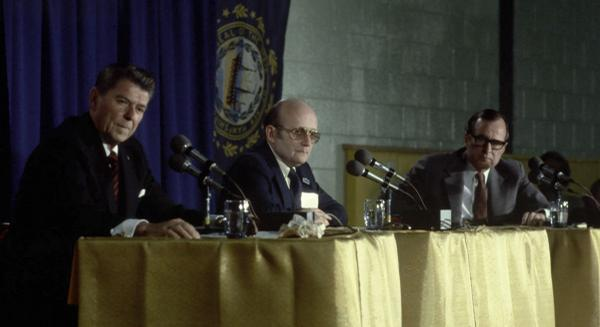
The Nashua debate between Reagan and Bush

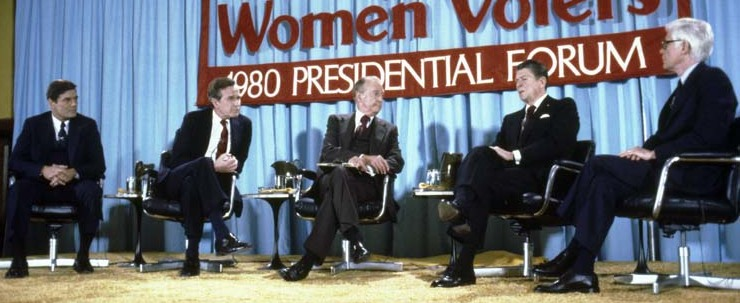
A Chicago debate with Crane, Bush, moderator Eric Sevareid, Reagan, and Anderson

Active campaign	Exploratory committee	Withdrawn candidate	Republican National Convention
Midterm elections	Debates	Primaries	Republican National Convention

Ronald Reagan, who had narrowly lost the 1976 Republican nomination to President Gerald Ford, was the early odds-on favorite to win the nomination in 1980. He was so far ahead in the polls that campaign director John Sears decided on an "above the fray" strategy. He did not attend many of the multi-candidate forums and straw polls in the summer and fall of 1979. George H. W. Bush, the former director of the Central Intelligence Agency and chairman of the Republican National Committee, did go to all the "cattle calls", and began to come in first at a number of these events. Along with the top two, a number of other Republican politicians entered the race. In January 1980, the Iowa Republicans decided to have a straw poll as a part of their caucuses for that year. Bush defeated Reagan by a small margin. Bush declared he had "the Big Mo", and with Reagan boycotting the Puerto Rico primary in deference to New Hampshire, Bush won the territory easily, giving him an early lead going into New Hampshire.

With the other candidates in single digits, the Nashua Telegraph offered to host a debate between Reagan and Bush. Worried that a newspaper-sponsored debate might violate electoral regulations, Reagan subsequently arranged to fund the event with his own campaign money, inviting the other candidates to participate at short notice. The Bush camp did not learn of Reagan's decision to include the other candidates until the debate was due to commence. Bush refused to participate, which led to an impasse on the stage. As Reagan attempted to explain his decision, Jon Breen, the editor of the Nashua Telegraph and debate moderator, ordered a technician to mute Reagan's microphone. When the technician refused, Breen repeated his order. A visibly angry Reagan responded, "I am paying for this microphone, Mr. Green [sic]!" Eventually the other candidates agreed to leave, and the debate proceeded between Reagan and Bush. Reagan's quote was often repeated as "I paid for this microphone!" and dominated news coverage of the event; Reagan sailed to an easy win in New Hampshire.

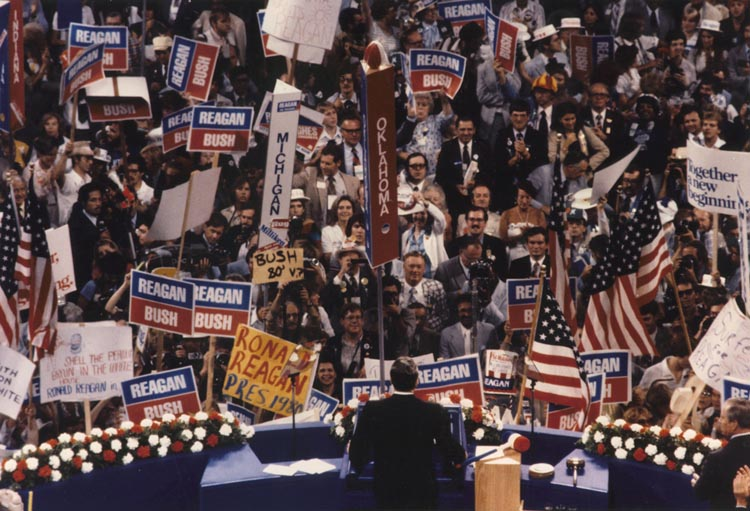
Ronald Reagan delivering his acceptance speech at the Republican National Convention in Detroit, Michigan, on July 17, 1980.

Lee Bandy, a writer for the South Carolina newspaper The State stated that heading into the South Carolina primary, political operative Lee Atwater worked to engineer a victory for Reagan: "Lee Atwater figured that Connally was their biggest threat here in South Carolina. So Lee leaked a story to me that John Connally was trying to buy the black vote. Well, that story got out, thanks to me, and it probably killed Connally. He spent $10 million for one delegate. Lee saved Ronald Reagan's candidacy."

Reagan swept the South, and although he lost five more primaries to Bush—including the Massachusetts primary in which he came in third place behind John B. Anderson—the former governor had a lock on the nomination very early in the season. Reagan said he would always be grateful to the people of Iowa for giving him "the kick in the pants" he needed.

Reagan was an adherent to a policy known as supply-side economics, which argues that economic growth can be most effectively created using incentives for people to produce (supply) goods and services, such as adjusting income tax and capital gains tax rates. Accordingly, Reagan promised an economic revival that would benefit all sectors of the population. He said that cutting tax rates would actually increase tax revenues because the lower rates would cause people to work harder as they would be able to keep more of their money. Reagan also called for a drastic cut in "big government" and pledged to deliver a balanced budget for the first time since 1969. In the primaries, Bush called Reagan's economic policy "voodoo economics" because it promised to lower taxes and increase revenues at the same time.

== Schedule and results ==
Date (daily totals)	Contest	Total pledged delegates									
Date (daily totals)	Contest	Total pledged delegates	Delegates won and popular vote (Note: This should not be taken as a finalized list of results. While a significant amount of research was done, there were a number of Delegates who were not bound by the instruction, or "Pledged" to a candidate, and to simplify the data these delegates were considered "Uncommitted". Some states also held primaries for the delegate positions, and these on occasion were where slates or candidates pledge to a certain candidate might be elected; however, as these elections allowed for a single person to vote for multiple candidates, as many as the number of positions being filled, it is difficult to determine how many people actually voted in these primaries. For this reason, while the results of some are in the table, they are not included in the popular vote summaries at the bottom of the table.)								
Date (daily totals)	Contest	Total pledged delegates	Ronald Reagan	George Bush	John Anderson	Phil Crane	Bob Dole	John Connally	Howard Baker	Others	Uncommitted
January 21	Iowa caucus 106,608	0 (of 38)	31,348 (29.40%)	33,530 (31.45%)	4,585 (4.30%)	7,135 (6.69%)	1,576 (1.48%)	9,861 (9.25%)	16,773 (15.73%)	–	1,800 (1.69%)
February 2	Arkansas district conventions	12 (of 19)	6	1	–	–	–	–	4	–	1
February 16	Arkansas convention	7 (of 19)	1	1	–	–	–	1	–	–	4
February 17	Puerto Rico 187,946	14 (of 20)	–	14; 112,901 (60.07%)	–	–	457 (0.24%)	2,039 (1.08%)	70,025 (37.26%)	2,524 (Note: Includes 1,822 votes for Benjamin Fernandez and 589 votes for Harold Stassen.) (1.34%)	–
February 26	New Hampshire 146,782	23	15; 72,734 (49.55%)	5; 33,304 (22.69%)	14,622 (9.96%)	2,633 (1.79%)	608 (0.41%)	2,215 (1.51%)	2; 18,760 (12.78%)	1,906 WI (Note: Includes 380 write-in votes for Gerald Ford.) (1.30%)	–
March 1	Iowa county conventions	2,902 CDs	925 CDs (31.87%)	1,150 CDs (39.63%)	64 CDs (2.21%)	91 CDs (3.14%)	2 CDs (0.07%)	127 CDs (4.38%)	322 CDs (11.10%)	–	221 CDs (7.62%)
March 4	Massachusetts 400,826	42	13; 115,334 (28.77%)	14; 124,365 (31.03%)	13; 122,987 (30.68%)	4,669 (1.16%)	577 (0.14%)	4,714 (1.18%)	2; 19,366 (4.82%)	6,571 WI (Note: Includes 3,398 Write-in votes for Gerald Ford, 374 votes for Benjamin Fernandez, and 218 votes for Harold Stassen.) (1.64%)	2,243 (0.56%)
March 4	Vermont 65,611	0 (of 19)	19,720 (30.06%)	14,226 (21.68%)	19,030 (29.00%)	1,238 (1.89%)	–	884 WI (1.35%)	8,055 (12.28%)	2,458 WI (3.75%)	–
March 8	South Carolina 145,501	25	25; 79,549 (54.67%)	21,569 (14.82%)	–	–	117 (0.08%)	43,113 (29.63%)	773 (0.53%)	380 (Note: Includes 171 votes for Benjamin Fernandez and 150 votes for Harold Stassen.) (0.26%)	–
March 11 (126)	Alabama 211,353	27	18; 147,352 (69.72%)	9; 54,730 (25.90%)	–	5,099 (2.41%)	447 (0.21%)	1,077 (0.51%)	1,963 (0.93%)	685 (Note: Includes 544 votes for Harold Stassen.) (0.32%)	–
March 11 (126)	Florida 614,995	51	51; 345,699 (56.21%)	185,996 (30.24%)	56,636 (9.21%)	12,000 (1.95%)	1,086 (0.18%)	4,958 (0.81%)	6,345 (1.03%)	2,275 (Note: Includes 1,377 votes for Harold Stassen and 898 votes for Benjamin Fernandez.) (0.37%)	–
March 11 (126)	Georgia 200,171	36	36; 146,500 (73.18%)	25,293 (12.64%)	16,853 (8.42%)	6,308 (3.15%)	249 (0.12%)	2,388 (1.19%)	1,571 (0.78%)	1,009 (Note: Includes 809 votes for Benjamin Fernandez and 200 votesfor Harold Stassen.) (0.50%)	–
March 18	Illinois (Note: There were two primaries in this state: a non-binding preference primary in which eligible voters cast ballots directly for a candidate and a delegate primary in which delegates to the National Convention were elected.) 1,130,081	92	46; 547,355 (48.44%)	2; 124,057 (10.98%)	26; 415,193 (36.74%)	4; 24,865 (2.20%)	1,843 (0.16%)	4,548 (0.40%)	7,051 (0.62%)	5,169 (Note: Includes 3,757 votes for Veldi Arvel "VA" Kelley and 1,106 write-in votes for Gerald Ford.) (0.46%)	–
March 25	Connecticut 182,284	35	14; 61,735 (33.87%)	15; 70,367 (38.60%)	6; 40,354 (22.14%)	1,887 (1.04%)	333 (0.18%)	598 (0.33%)	2,446 (1.34%)	308 (Note: All 308 votes for Benjamin Fernandez.) (0.17%)	4,256 (2.33%)
March 25	New York	117 (of 123)	72	6	1	–	–	–	–	–	38
April 1	Kansas 285,398	35	20; 179,739 (62.98%)	4; 35,838 (12.56%)	5; 51,924 (18.19%)	1,367 (0.48%)	–	2,067 (0.72%)	3,603 (1.26%)	4,134 (Note: Includes 809 votes for Benjamin Fernandez and 200 votes for Harold Stassen.) (1.45%)	6,726 (2.36%)
April 1	Wisconsin 907,853	34	28; 364,898 (40.19%)	276,164 (30.42%)	6; 248,623 (27.39%)	2,951 (0.33%)	–	2,312 (0.26%)	3,298 (0.36%)	7,012 WI (Note: Includes 1,051 votes for Benjamin Fernandez and 1,010 votes for Harold Stassen.) (0.77%)	4,951 (0.29%)
April 5	Louisiana 42,397	29	29; 31,256 (73.72%)	8,066 (19.02%)	–	–	–	–	–	820 (Note: Includes 150 votes for Harold Stassen and 125 votes for Benjamin Fernandez.) (1.93%)	2,255 (5.32%)
April 17	North Dakota convention	28	12	1	–	–	–	–	–	–	4
April 19	Maine convention	21	–	17	–	–	–	–	–	–	4
April 19	Minnesota (Note: Only two of eight districts held conventions on this date.) district conventions	6 (of 34)	6	–	–	–	–	–	–	–	–
April 20	Alaska convention	19	19	–	–	–	–	–	–	–	–
April 22	Pennsylvania 1,241,411	76 (of 83)	527,916 (42.53%)	626,759 (50.49%)	26,890 WI (2.17%)	–	–	10,656 (0.86%)	30,846 (2.49%)	76 (Note: It was generally felt that Reagan had won over the vast majority of those delegates elected, though legally they were uncommitted.); 18,344 (Note: Includes 6,767 votes for Harold Stassen and 2,521 votes for Benjamin Fernandez.) (1.48%)	–
April 22	Vermont caucuses	979 SDs (Note: Results only for 537 of the 979 Delegates were accounted for in the source.)	318 SDs (32.48%)	67 SDs (6.84%)	13 SDs (1.33%)	–	–	–	–	–	–
April 26	Minnesota (Note: Only one of eight districts held conventions on this date.) district conventions	3 (of 34)	3	–	–	–	–	–	–	–	–
April 26	Missouri (Note: Only five of ten districts held conventions on this date.) district conventions	15 (of 37)	15	–	–	–	–	–	–	–	–
May 3	Arizona convention	28	28	–	–	–	–	–	–	–	–
May 3	Minnesota (Note: Only five of eight districts held conventions on this date.) district conventions	12 (of 34)	4	8	–	–	–	–	–	–	–
May 3	Missouri (Note: Only five of ten districts held conventions on this date.) district conventions	15 (of 37)	15	–	–	–	–	–	–	–	–
May 3	Oklahoma convention	28	28	–	–	–	–	–	–	–	–
May 3	Texas 526,769	80	65; 268,798 (50.49%)	15; 249,819 (47.43%)	–	–	–	–	–	–	8,152 (1.55%)
May 6	Washington, D.C. 7,529	14	–	14; 4,973 (66.05%)	2,025 (26.90%)	–	–	–	–	261 (Note: Includes 201 votes for Harold Stassen and 60 votes for Benjamin Fernandez.) (3.47%)	–
May 6	Indiana 568,313	56	56; 419,016 (73.73%)	92,955 (16.36%)	56,342 (9.91%)	–	–	–	–	–	–
May 6	North Carolina 168,391	40	30; 113,854 (67.61%)	10; 36,631 (21.75%)	8,542 (5.07%)	547 (0.33%)	629 (0.37%)	1,107 (0.66%)	2,543 (1.51%)	–	4,538 (2.70%)
May 6	Tennessee 195,210	32	24; 144,625 (74.09%)	8; 35,274 (18.07%)	8,722 (4.47%)	1,574 (0.81%)	629 (0.37%)	1 WI (0.00%)	16 WI (0.01%)	22 WI (Note: Includes 14 write-in votes for Gerald Ford.) (0.01%)	4,976 (2.55%)
May 10	Wyoming convention	19	16	–	–	–	–	–	–	–	3
May 13	Maryland 167,303	30	15; 80,557 (48.15%)	15; 68,389 (40.88%)	16,244 (9.71%)	2,113 (1.26%)	–	–	–	–	–
May 13	Nebraska 205,203	25	25; 155,995 (76.02%)	31,380 (15.29%)	11,879 (5.79%)	1,062 (0.52%)	1,420 (0.69%)	–	–	3,467 (Note: Includes 799 votes for Harold Stassen and 400 votes for Benjamin Fernandez.) (1.69%)	–
May 17	Hawaii convention	14	–	–	–	–	–	–	–	–	14
May 20 (116)	Michigan 595,176	82	29; 189,184 (31.79%)	53; 341,998 (57.46%)	48,947 (8.22%)	–	–	–	–	4,782 (Note: Includes 2,248 votes for Benjamin Fernandez and 1,938 votes for Harold Stassen.) (0.80%)	10,265 (1.73%)
May 20 (116)	Oregon 315,366	29	18; 170,449 (54.05%)	11; 109,210 (34.63%)	32,118 (10.18%)	2,324 (0.74%)	–	–	–	1,265 WI (0.40%)	–
May 17	Delaware convention	12 (of 21)	4	6	–	–	–	–	–	–	2
May 25	Vermont convention	19	16	–	–	–	–	–	–	–	3
May 27	Idaho 134,879	17 (of 21)	15; 111,868 (82.94%)	5,416 (4.02%)	2; 13,130 (9.74%)	1,024 (0.76%)	–	–	–	–	3,441 (2.55%)
May 27	Kentucky 94,795	27	27; 78,072 (82.36%)	6,861 (7.24%)	4,791 (5.05%)	–	–	–	–	1,987 (Note: Includes 1,223 votes for Harold Stassen and 764 votes for Benjamin Fernandez.) (2.10%)	3,084 (3.25%)
May 27	Nevada 47,395	17	14; 39,352 (83.03%)	1; 3,078 (6.49%)	–	–	–	–	–	–	2; 4,965 (10.48%)
May 30	Minnesota convention	10 (of 34)	10	–	–	–	–	–	–	–	–
May 31	Colorado (Note: Only one of five districts held conventions on this date.) district conventions	3 (of 31)	3	–	–	–	–	–	–	–	–
May 31	Missouri convention	7 (of 37)	7	–	–	–	–	–	–	–	–
June 3 (408)	California 2,564,072	168	168; 2,057,923 (80.26%)	125,113 (4.88%)	349,315 (13.62%)	21,465 (0.84%)	–	–	–	10,256 (Note: Includes 10,242 votes for Benjamin Fernandez.) (0.40%)	–
June 3 (408)	Mississippi 25,751	22	22; 23,028 (89.43%)	2,105 (8.17%)	–	–	–	–	–	–	618 (2.40%)
June 3 (408)	Montana 79,473	0 (of 20)	68,794 (86.56%)	7,665 (9.65%)	–	–	–	–	–	–	–
June 3 (408)	New Jersey 277,977 (79,473)	66	63; 225,959 (81.29%)	2; 47,447 (17.07%)	–	–	–	–	–	1; 4,571 (Note: All votes for Harold Stassen.) (1.64%)	–
June 3 (408)	New Mexico 59,546	22	22; 37,982 (63.79%)	5,892 (9.90%)	–	–	–	–	4,412 (7.41%)	2,742 (Note: Includes 1,795 votes for Benjamin Fernandez and 947 votes for Harold Stassen.) (4.60%)	1,347 (2.26%)
June 3 (408)	Ohio 856,773	77	77; 692,288 (80.80%)	164,485 (19.20%)	–	–	–	–	–	–	–
June 3 (408)	Rhode Island 5,335	13	12; 3,839 (71.96%)	1; 993 (18.61%)	–	–	–	–	–	155 (Note: Includes 107 votes for Harold Stassen and 48 votes for Benjamin Fernandez.) (2.91%)	348 (6.52%)
June 3 (408)	South Dakota 82,905	22	22; 72,861 (87.89%)	3,691 (4.45%)	–	–	–	–	–	987 (Note: All votes for Harold Stassen.) (1.19%)	5,366 (6.47%)
June 3 (408)	West Virginia 138,016	18	15; 115,407 (83.62%)	19,509 (14.14%)	–	–	–	–	–	3,100 (Note: All votes for Harold Stassen.) (2.25%)	3
June 6 (67)	Iowa district conventions	30 (of 37)	17	13	–	–	–	–	–	–	–
June 6 (67)	Washington convention	37	34	1	1	–	–	–	–	–	1
June 7	Colorado (Note: The results four district conventions are included, their exact dates not being found.) conventions	28 (of 31)	28	–	–	–	–	–	–	–	–
June 7	Iowa convention	7 (of 30)	4	3	–	–	–	–	–	–	–
June 8	Montana convention	20	20	–	–	–	–	–	–	–	–
June 28	Idaho convention	4 (of 21)	4	–	–	–	–	–	–	–	–
June 28	Utah convention	21	21	–	–	–	–	–	–	–	–
Totals	1,990 12,894,286		1,407 7,709,793 (59.79%)	250 3,070,033 (23.81%)	59 1,572,174 (12.19%)	4 97,793 (0.76%)	0 7,204 (0.06%)	1 82,625 (0.64%)	8 181,153 (1.41%)	0	156 112,560 (0.87%)

The Republican National Convention was held in Detroit, Michigan, from July 14 to 17, 1980.

== See also ==
- 1980 Democratic Party presidential primaries
