= 1980 Republican Party vice presidential candidate selection =

1980 Republican vice presidential nomination
- July 17, 1980
Nominee	George H. W. Bush
Home state	Texas
Previous Vice Presidential nominee
Bob Dole
Vice Presidential nominee
George H. W. Bush

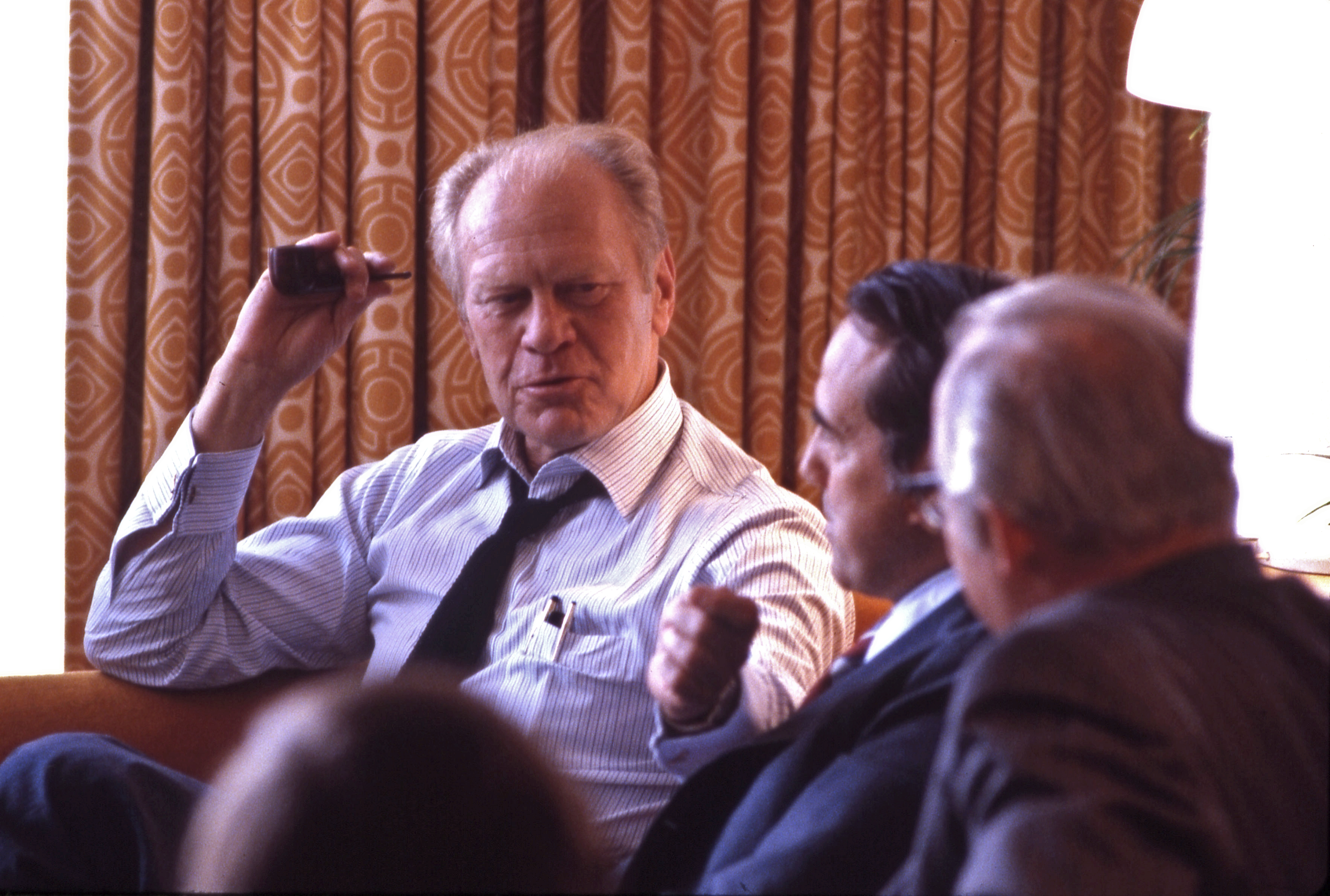
On July 16 Gerald Ford consulted with Bob Dole, Howard Baker and Bill Brock concerning the vice presidential nomination. Reagan would eventually choose Bush.

This article lists those who were potential candidates for the Republican nomination for Vice President of the United States in the 1980 election. Former California Governor Ronald Reagan won the 1980 Republican nomination for President of the United States, and chose former CIA Director George H. W. Bush as his running mate.

Reagan had considered naming former president Gerald Ford as his running mate, but after it became clear that Ford and Reagan were unable to agree to be on the same ticket (a televised interview with Ford brought up possibility of a "co-presidency"), Reagan turned to Bush, his primary rival for the 1980 Republican nomination. Though Bush had criticized Reagan's policies, Reagan chose Bush to help unify the party, and Bush agreed to be on the ticket and to support Reagan's platform.

The Reagan–Bush ticket would go on to defeat the Democratic tickets of Carter–Mondale in 1980 and Mondale–Ferraro in 1984. Bush was later elected president in his own right in 1988 but ultimately lost his bid for re-election to Bill Clinton in 1992.

When Reagan unsuccessfully sought the 1976 nomination, he had named Pennsylvania Senator Richard Schweiker as his running mate, but Schweiker was not considered again when Reagan won the 1980 nomination. Schweiker was later named Reagan's Secretary of Health and Human Services.

== Potential running mates ==
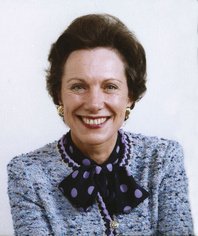
Former Ambassador to the U.K.
Anne Armstrong
(1976–1977)

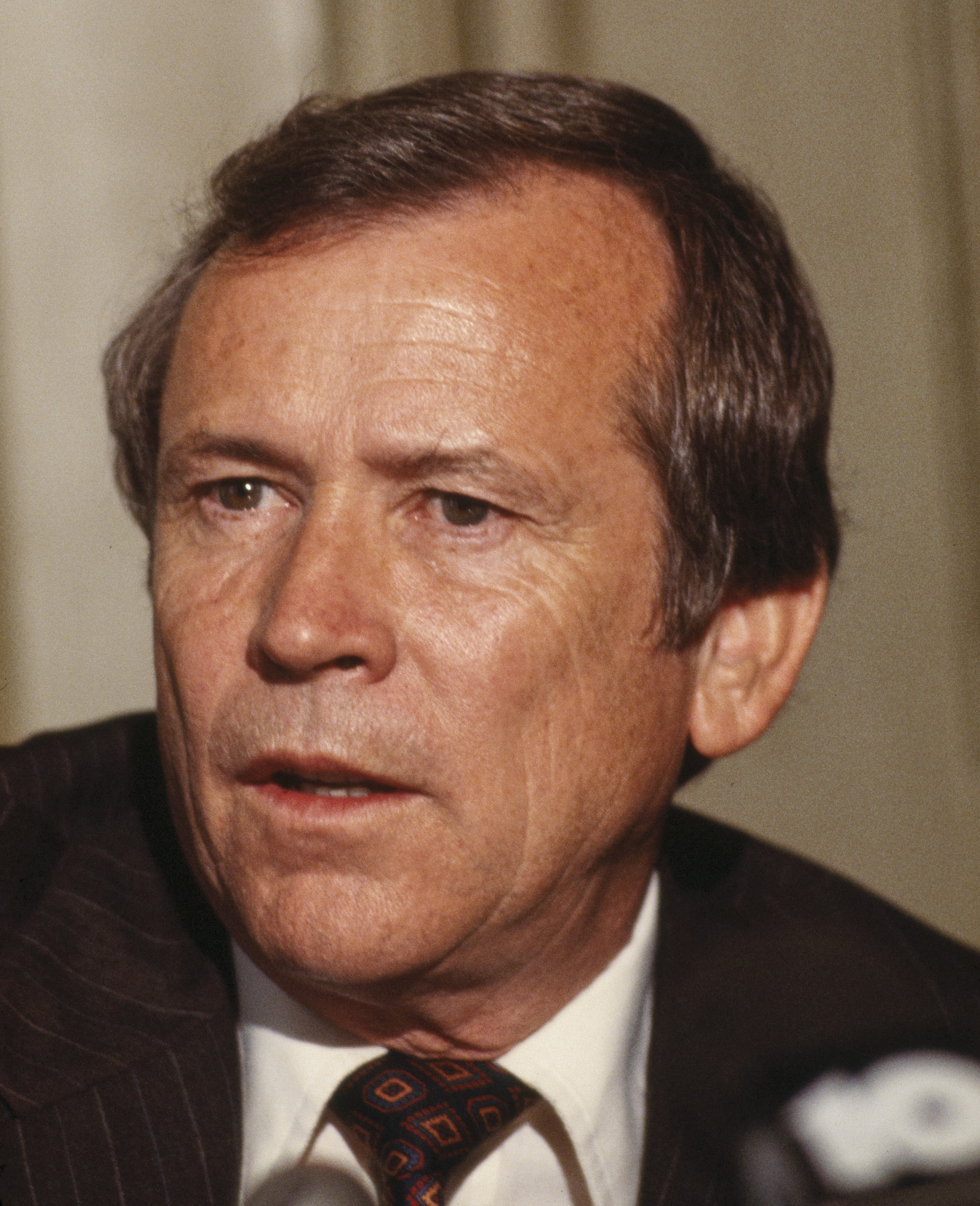
Senator and Senate Minority Leader
Howard Baker
from Tennessee
(1967–1985)

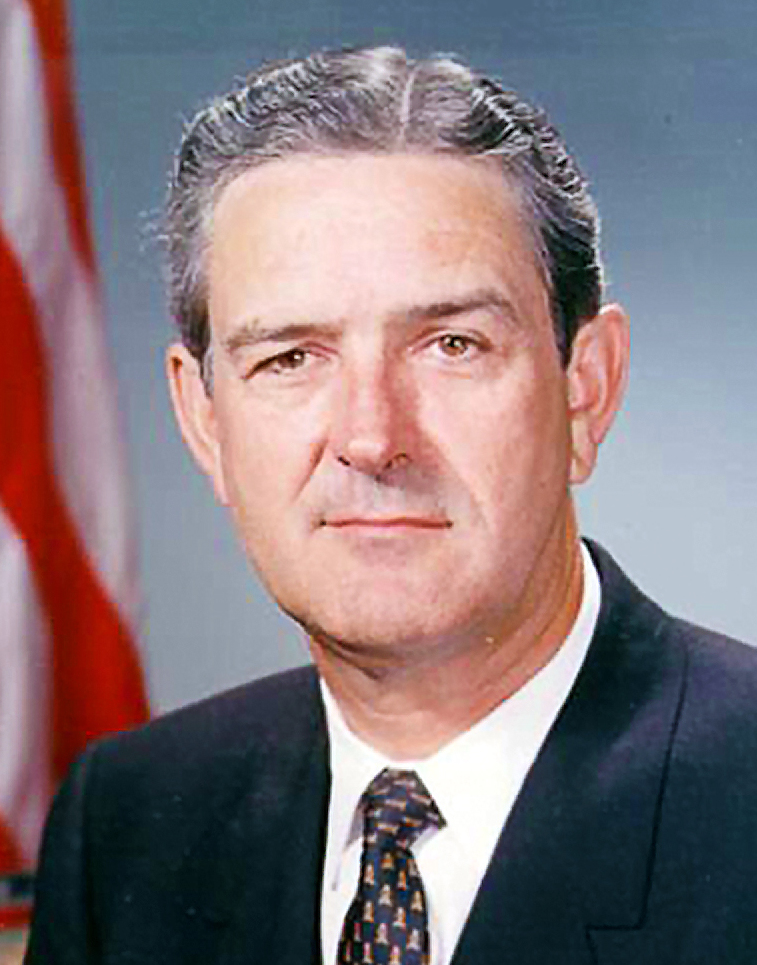
Former Secretary of the Treasury
John Connally
of Texas
(1971–1973)

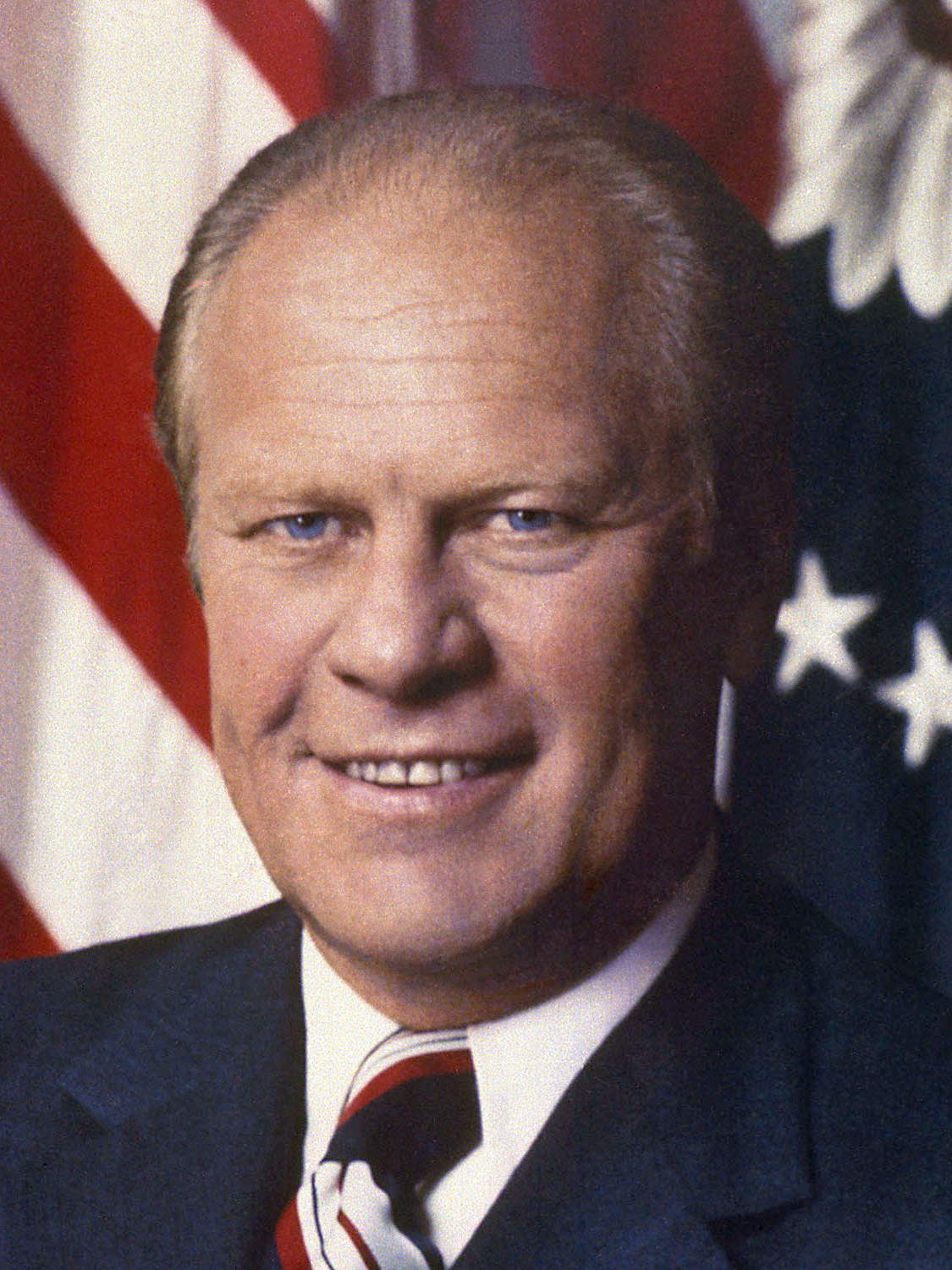
Former President of the United States
Gerald Ford
from Michigan
(1974–1977)

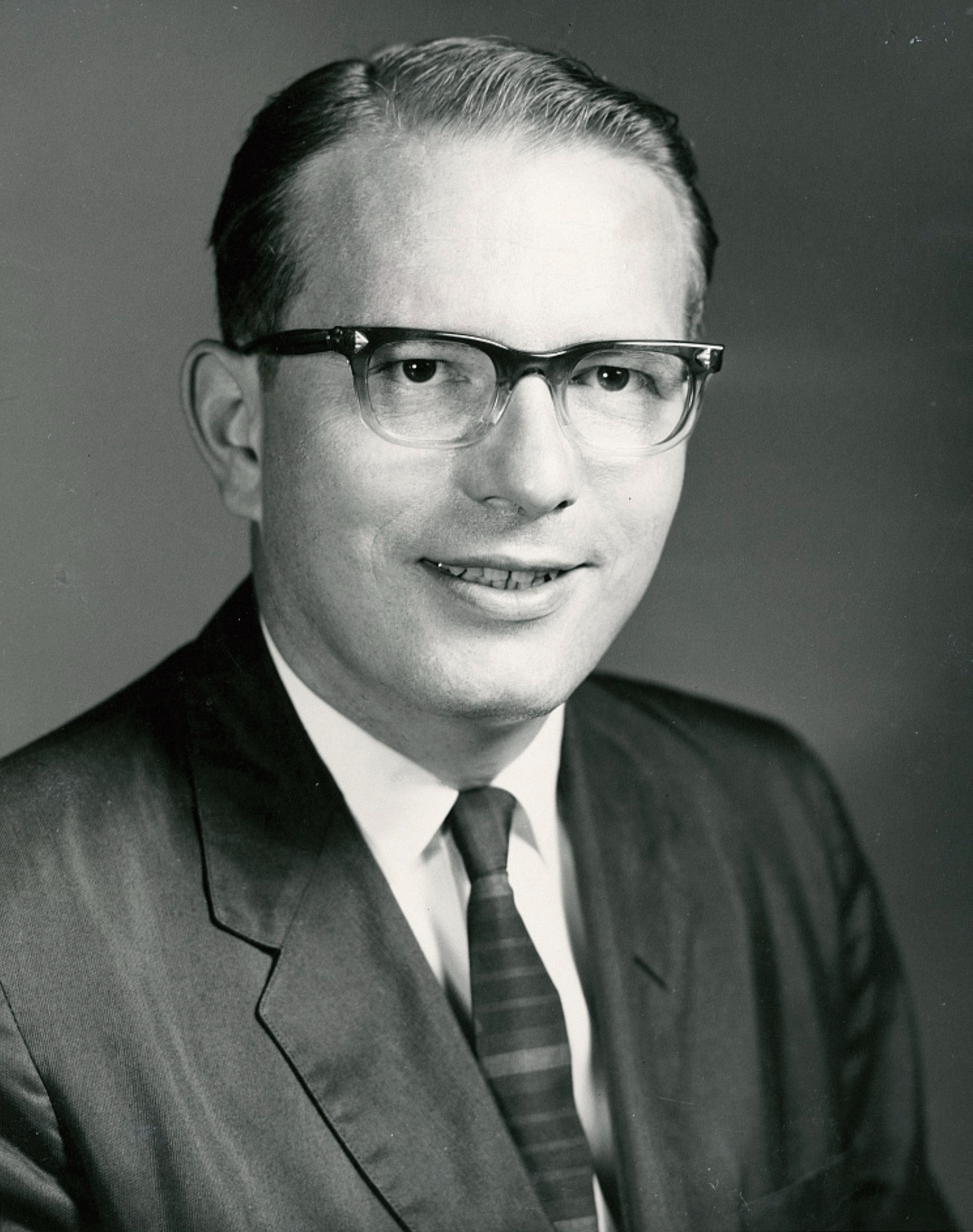
Representative
Guy Vander Jagt
from Michigan
(1966–1993)

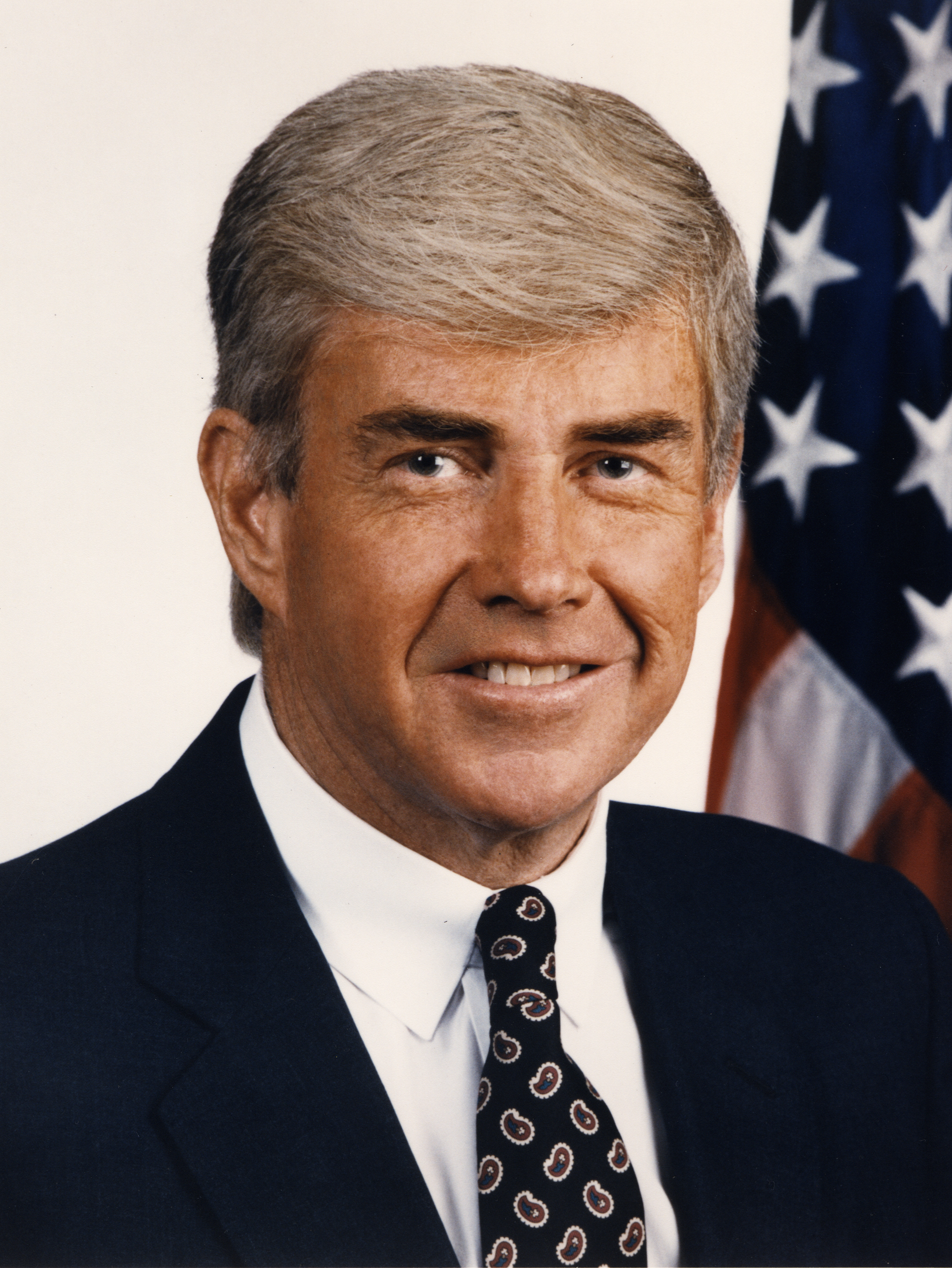
Representative
Jack Kemp
from New York
(1971–1989)

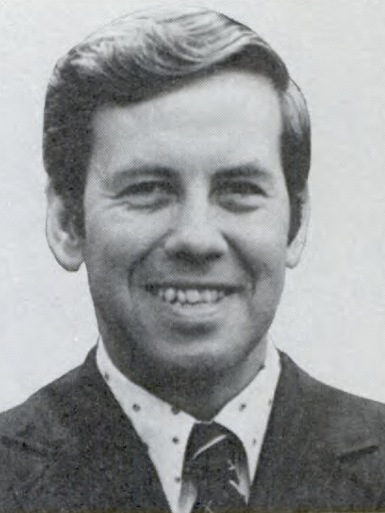
Senator
Richard Lugar
from Indiana
(1977–2013)

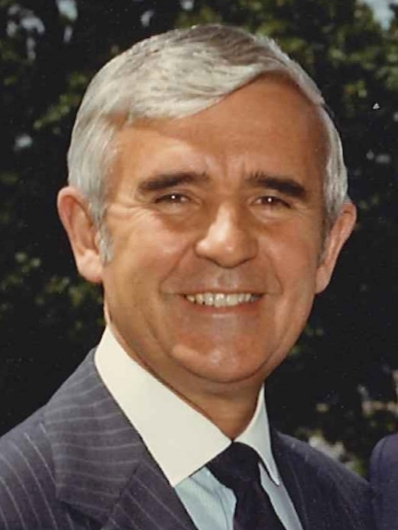
Senator
Paul Laxalt
from Nevada
(1974–1987)

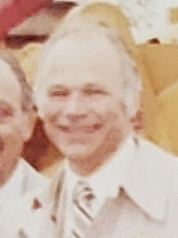
Governor
Al Quie
of Minnesota
(1979–1983)

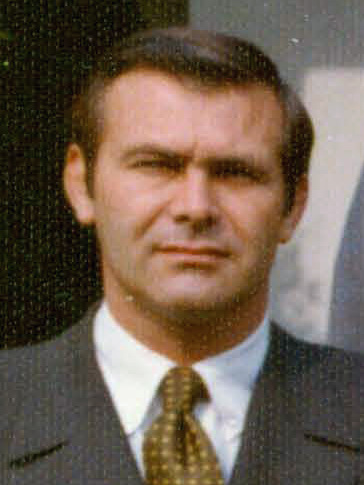
Former Secretary of Defense
Donald Rumsfeld
(1975–1977)

== See also ==
- Ronald Reagan 1980 presidential campaign
- 1980 Republican Party presidential primaries
- 1980 Republican National Convention
- 1980 United States presidential election
- List of United States major party presidential tickets
