= Smart power =

Combination of hard power and soft power strategies in international relations

In international relations, the term smart power refers to the combination of hard power and soft power strategies. It is defined by the Center for Strategic and International Studies as "an approach that underscores the necessity of a strong military, but also invests heavily in alliances, partnerships, and institutions of all levels to expand one's influence and establish legitimacy of one's action."

Joseph Nye, former Assistant Secretary of Defense for International Security Affairs under the Clinton administration and author of several books on smart power strategy, suggests that the most effective strategies in foreign policy today require a mix of hard and soft power resources. Employing only hard power or only soft power in a given situation will usually prove inadequate. Nye utilizes the example of terrorism, arguing that combatting terrorism demands smart power strategy. He advises that simply utilizing soft power resources to change the hearts and minds of the Taliban government would be ineffective and requires a hard power component. In developing relationships with the mainstream Muslim world, however, soft power resources are necessary and the use of hard power would have damaging effects.

According to Chester A. Crocker, smart power "involves the strategic use of diplomacy, persuasion, capacity building, and the projection of power and influence in ways that are cost-effective and have political and social legitimacy" – essentially the engagement of both military force and all forms of diplomacy.

== Origin ==
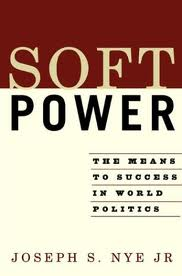
Joseph Nye's book describing the concept of "soft power"

The origin of the term "smart power" is under debate and has been attributed to both Suzanne Nossel and Joseph Nye.

Suzanne Nossel, Deputy to Ambassador Holbrooke at the United Nations during the Clinton administration, is credited with coining the term in an article in Foreign Affairs entitled, "Smart Power: Reclaiming Liberal Internationalism", in 2004. In a more recent article for CNN, she has criticized the Trump administration for its "tunnel-vision" foreign policy that neglects both soft power and smart power. She writes: "..Trump seems oblivious toward the brand value of what Joseph Nye has called the 'soft power' that comes from projecting appealing aspects of American society and character abroad. He is also indifferent to my own concept of 'smart power,'or the imperative to engage a broad range of tools of statecraft, from diplomacy to aid to private sector engagement to military intervention."

Joseph Nye, however, claims that smart power is a term he introduced in 2003 "to counter the misperception that soft power alone can produce effective foreign policy." He created the term to name an alternative to the hard power-driven foreign policy of the Bush administration. Nye notes that smart power strategy denotes the ability to combine hard and soft power depending on whether hard or soft power would be more effective in a given situation. He states that many situations require soft power; however, in stopping North Korea's nuclear weapons program, for instance, hard power might be more effective than soft power. In the words of the Financial Times, "to win the peace, therefore, the US will have to show as much skill in exercising soft power as it has in using hard power to win the war." Smart power addresses multilateralism and enhances foreign policy.

A successful smart power narrative for the United States in the twenty-first century, Nye argues, will not obsess over power maximization or the preservation of hegemony. Rather, it will find "ways to combine resources into successful strategies in the new context of power diffusion and the 'rise of the rest.'" A successful smart power strategy will provide answers to the following questions: 1) What goals or outcomes are preferred? 2) What resources are available and in which contexts? 3) What are the positions and preferences of the targets of attempts at influence? 4) Which forms of power behavior are most likely to succeed? 5) What is the probability of success?

== History ==
=== United Kingdom ===
Since the period of Pax Britannica (1815–1914) the foreign relations of the United Kingdom has employed a combination of influence and coercion in international relations.

=== United States ===
The term smart power emerged in the past decade, but the concept of smart power has much earlier roots in the history of the United States and is a popular notion in international relations today.

1901
President Theodore Roosevelt proclaims: "Speak softly and carry a big stick."
1948
The United States initiates major peacetime soft power programs under the authority of the Smith-Mundt Act, including broadcasting, exchange and information world wide to combat the outreach of the Soviet Union.
1991
The end of the Cold War was marked by the collapse of the Berlin Wall, which fell as a result of a combination of hard and soft power. Throughout the Cold War, hard power was used to deter Soviet aggression and soft power was used to erode faith in Communism. Joseph Nye said: "When the Berlin Wall finally collapsed, it was destroyed not by artillery barrage but by hammers and bulldozers wielded by those who had lost faith in communism."
2004
Joseph S. Nye introduces the term "smart power" in his book, "Soft Power: The Means to Success in World Politics". "Smart power is neither hard nor soft. It is both," he writes. In an article in "Foreign Affairs", analyst Suzanne Nossel uses the term "smart power". For Nossel, "Smart power means knowing that the United States' own hand is not always its best tool: U.S. interests are furthered by enlisting others on behalf of U.S. goals."
2007
In light of 9/11 and the war in Iraq, the Bush administration was criticized for placing too much emphasis on a hard power strategy. To counter this hard power strategy, the Center for Strategic and International Studies released the "Commission on Smart Power" to introduce the concept of smart power into discussion on which principles should guide the future of U.S. foreign policy in light of 9/11 and the war in Iraq. The report identifies five critical areas of focus for the U.S.: Alliances, Global Development, Public Diplomacy, Economic Integration, and Technology and Innovation. According to the report, these five goals constitute smart foreign policy and will help the United States achieve the goal of "American preeminence as an agent of good."
2009
The Center for Strategic and International Studies, released a second report, "Investing in a New Multilateralism", to address the concept of smart power in international releases. This report addressed the United Nations as an instrument of U.S. smart power. By collaborating with the UN, the U.S. can lead the way in reinvigorating multilateralism within the international community in the 21st century.
2009
Under the Obama administration, smart power became a core principle of his foreign policy strategy. It was popularized by Hillary Clinton during her Senate confirmation hearing on January 13, 2009 for the position of Secretary of State:

We must use what has been called smart power---the full range of tools at our disposal---diplomatic, economic, military, political, legal, and cultural---picking the right tool, or combination of tools, for each situation. With smart power, diplomacy will be the vanguard of foreign policy.

Both Suzanne Nossel and Joseph Nye were supportive of Clinton's encouragement of smart power, since it would popularize the use of smart power in U.S. foreign policy. That popularization has been accompanied by more frequent use of the term, and David Ignatius describes it as an "overused and vapid phrase meant to connote the kind of power between hard and soft".
2010
The "First Quadrennial Diplomacy and Development Review (QDDR)" entitled, "Leading through Civilian Power", called for the implementation of a smart power strategy through civilian leadership.
2011
Obama's "2011 May Speech on the Middle East and North Africa" called for a smart power strategy, incorporating development, in addition to defense and diplomacy, as the third pillar of his foreign policy doctrine.

== Contemporary application ==
=== United Kingdom ===
The UK government Strategic Defence and Security Review 2015 was based on a combination of hard power and soft power strategies. Following the Poisoning of Sergei and Yulia Skripal in 2018, the National Security Review described a "fusion doctrine", that will combine resources from British intelligence agencies, the British Armed Forces, foreign relations and economic considerations to defeat the UK's enemies.

=== United States ===
In recent years, some scholars have sought to differentiate smart power further from soft power, while also including military posture and other tools of statecraft as part of a broad smart power philosophy. Christian Whiton, a State Department official during the George W. Bush administration, recalled U.S. political influence activities from the Cold War, including CIA-backed programs like the Congress for Cultural Freedom, and called for adapting these to contemporary challenges to the U.S. posed by China, Iran, and Islamists.

== Challenges in the application of smart power ==
According to "Dealing with Today's Asymmetric Threat to U.S. and Global Security", a symposium sponsored by CACI, an effective smart power strategy faces multiple challenges in transitioning from smart power as a theory to smart power in practice. Applying smart power today requires great difficulty, since it operates in an environment of asymmetric threats, ranging from cybersecurity to terrorism. These threats exist in a dynamic international environment, adding yet another challenge to the application of smart power strategy. In order to effectively address asymmetric threats arising in a dynamic international environment, the symposium suggests addressing the following factors: rule of law, organizational roadblocks, financing smart power, and strategic communications.

=== Rule of law ===
In order to implement smart power approaches on both a domestic and international level, the United States must develop a legal framework for the use of smart power capabilities. Developing a legal foundation for smart power, however, demands a clear concept of these asymmetric threats, which is often difficult. The cyber domain, for instance, presents an extremely nebulous concept. Hence, the challenge will be conceptualizing asymmetric threats before formulating a legal framework.

=== Organizational roadblocks ===
The inability to promote smart power approaches because of organizational failures within agencies presents another obstacle to successful smart power implementation. Agencies often lack either the appropriate authority or resources to employ smart power. The only way to give smart power long-term sustainability is to address these organizational failures and promote the coordination and accessibility of hard and soft power resources.

=== Financing smart power ===
With the ongoing financial crisis, the dire need for financial resources presents a critical obstacle to the implementation of smart power. According to Secretary Gates, 'there is a need for a dramatic increase in spending on the civilian instruments of national security---diplomacy, strategic communications, foreign assistance, civic action, and economic reconstruction and development." In order to successfully implement smart power, the U.S. budget needs to be rebalanced so that non-military foreign affairs programs receive more funding. Sacrificing defense spending will, however, be met with stalwart resistance.

=== Strategic communications ===
"Asymmetries of perception," according to the report, are a major obstacle to strategic communications. A long-term smart power strategy will mitigate negative perceptions by discussing the nature of these threats and making a case for action using smart power strategy. The report states that the central theme of our strategic communications campaign should be education of our nation in our values as a democratic nation and in the nature of the threats our nation faces today.

== United Nations as an instrument of smart power ==
Of all the tools at the disposal of smart power strategists in the United States, experts suggest that the U.N. is the most critical. The Center for Strategic and International Studies issued a report, Investing in a New Multilateralism, in January 2009 to outline the role of the United Nations as an instrument of U.S. smart power strategy. The report suggests that in an increasingly multipolar world, the UN cannot be discarded as outdated and must be regarded as an essential tool to thinking strategically about the new multilateralism that our nation faces. An effective smart power strategy will align the interests of the U.S. and the UN, thereby effectively addressing threats to peace and security, climate change, global health, and humanitarian operations.

== Global perspectives on smart power ==
=== U.S.-China relations ===
As announced by Secretary of State Hillary Clinton in November 2011, the United States will begin to shift its attention to the Asia-Pacific region, making the strategic relationship between the U.S. and China of supreme importance in determining the future of international affairs in the region. The Center for Strategic and International Studies, in "Smart Power in U.S.-China Relations," offers recommendations for building a cooperative strategic relationship between the U.S. and China through smart power strategy. Rather than relying on unilateral action, the U.S. and China should combine their smart power resources to promote the global good and enhance the peace and security of the region. The report recommends the following policy objectives: implement an aggressive engagement agenda, launch an action agenda on energy and climate, and institute a new dialogue on finance and economics. Overall, the report suggests that U.S.-Sino relations should be pursued without the black-and-white view of China as either benign or hostile, but rather, as a partner necessary in serving the interests of the U.S. and the region while promoting the global good.

=== U.S-Turkish Relations ===
The Obama administration continually stresses the importance of smart power strategy in relations with the Middle East and especially Turkey due to its increasing leadership role as a regional soft power. As not only an Islamic democratic nation but also the only Muslim member of NATO, Turkey's leverage in the region could inspire other nations to follow in its footsteps. By establishing a cooperative relationship with Turkey and working to clarify misunderstandings through smart power, Turkey could eventually become the bridge between the East and the West. A smart power approach to U.S.-Turkish relations will expand the leadership role of Turkey in the region and increases its strategic importance to NATO.

== Debate surrounding smart power ==
=== Transformational diplomacy versus smart power strategy ===
Condoleezza Rice, Bush's Secretary of State, coined the term "Transformational Diplomacy" to denote Bush's policy to promote democracy through a hard power driven strategy. "Transformational diplomacy" stands at odds with "smart power," which utilizes hard and soft power resources based on the situation. The Obama administration's foreign policy was based on smart power strategy, attempting to strike a balance between defense and diplomacy.

=== Smart power as an instrument of American imperialism ===
In an interview with the Boston Globe, interviewer Anna Mundow, questioned Joseph Nye over the criticism that smart power is the friendly face of American imperialism. By the same token, the Bush doctrine has also been criticized for being "imperialistic," by focusing on American power over partnerships with the rest of the world. Joseph Nye defends smart power by noting that criticism often stems from a misunderstanding of the smart power theory. Nye himself designed the theory to apply to any nation of any size, not just the United States. It was meant to be a more sophisticated method of thinking about power in the context of the information age and post-9/11 world.19 President Obama defined his vision for U.S. leadership as "not in the spirit of a patron but the spirit of a partner."

=== Ineffective use of smart power ===
Ken Adelman, in an article entitled "Not-So-Smart Power," argues that there is no correlation between U.S. aid and the ability of America to positively influence events abroad. He points out that the nations who receive the most foreign aid, such as Egypt and Pakistan, are no more in tune with American values than those who receive less or no U.S. foreign aid. Overall, he criticizes the instruments of smart power, such as foreign aid and exchange programs, for being ineffective in achieving American national interests.

=== Questioning old institutions and alliances ===
In the application of smart power in U.S. strategy, Ted Galen Carpenter, author of the work Smart Power', criticizes U.S. foreign policy for failing to question outdated alliances, such as NATO. Carpenter articulated his disapproval of interventionist foreign policy, saying, "America does not need to be — and should not aspire to be — a combination global policeman and global social worker." Rather than utilizing antiquated institutions, the U.S. should rethink certain alliances in arriving at a new vision for the future of American foreign policy. Carpenter fears that America's domestic interests will be sacrificed in favor of global interests through smart power. Essentially, interventionist foreign policies advocated by U.S. smart power strategies undercut domestic liberties.

== See also ==
- Cold war
- Cultural diplomacy
- Soft power
- Engagement (diplomacy)
- Public diplomacy
- Noopolitik
- Carrot and stick approach
- Progressive realism
- Transformational diplomacy
