= Progressive realism =

Foreign policy school of thought

Progressive realism is a centre-left foreign policy paradigm largely made popular by Robert Wright in 2006 which focuses on producing measurable results in pursuit of widely supported goals. It supports stronger international institutions, free trade, and national interests. The UK Foreign Secretary, David Lammy, suggested that Progressive Realism will underpin his foreign policy in a speech to the Fabian Society.

Progressive realists' beliefs stand in stark contrast to those of neoconservatives. Unlike neoconservatives, progressive realists assert that international security and economic interdependence enable international governance to advance national interests. They highlight the importance of strong participation in the United Nations and acquiescence to international law. The policy emphasizes the need to convert "hard" power and "soft" power into "smart" power.
