= Engagement (diplomacy) =

Engagement is applied in diplomacy as a synonym for a wider range of more specific practices of contact between an international actor and a foreign public, including public diplomacy, communication and the deployment of international aid. It is associated with the approach to foreign policy that some have dubbed smart power. It was the title of a 2008 anthology of essays on the future of public diplomacy published by the UK Foreign and Commonwealth Office.

Since January 2009, it has been widely used by the Obama administration, who in May 2009 announced the creation of a unit within the National Security Council responsible for coordinating diplomacy, aid and international communication called the Global Engagement Directive.

Variations on 'Engagement' include 'Strategic Public Engagement', which was first seen in June 2009 in a report by the Washington-based Think Tank Center for a New American Security entitled Beyond Bullets: A Pragmatic Strategy to Combat Violent Islamist Extremism.

The term engagement is used in both military and marketing contexts and thus has the advantage for the Obama administration of reassuring both these constituencies. Other terms might imply less neutrality or greater continuity with the approach of previous administration.

== See also ==
- Engagement (military)
- Engagement marketing
- Public diplomacy
- Smart power
