= Matthew Rabinowitz =

South African engineer

- Born: 4 February 1973 (age 52); Johannesburg, South Africa
- Years active: 1998–present
- Parents: Bernard Rabinowitz; Ruth Rabinowitz (née Zilibowitz)
- Awards: See list

Matthew Rabinowitz (born 4 February 1973) is a South African-American entrepreneur and investor. He is the co-founder and executive chairman of Natera (NTRA), a clinical genetic testing company. He serves as executive chairman, board member, adviser and angel investor to several companies and non-profits in diagnostics, biotech, machine learning, health services and nature conservation.

Rabinowitz has been a consulting professor in Aeronautics and Astronautics at Stanford University, visiting faculty in Genetics at Harvard Medical School. His technologies have generated over 100 patents and peer-reviewed publications.

== Early life and education ==
Matthew Rabinowitz was born on 4 February 1973 in Johannesburg, South Africa. His parents, Bernard “Bokkie” Rabinowitz and Ruth Rabinowitz (née Zilibowitz) were both doctors. From 1955 to 1985, Bokkie Rabinowitz was a general surgeon in South Africa after which he continued surgical teaching until 1996. His interests included trauma, HIV and the surgical conditions of Africa. In 1996, he became the Superintendent of the Baragwanath Hospital. Ruth was an MD who also qualified as a homeopath. As the South African Apartheid state was coming to an end, Ruth entered political activism. She was a Member of Parliament (MP) and Senator in South Africa, representing the Inkatha Freedom Party for 15 years as Health Spokesperson.

Rabinowitz attended Sandown Primary School and Redhill School (Johannesburg) in South Africa where he won the South African National Science Olympiad in 1990. In 1991, he attended the University of the Witwatersrand where he studied astronomy, maths, philosophy, accounting and electrical engineering. In 1992, he relocated to the US after receiving a scholarship to attend Stanford University where he completed a Bachelor of Arts, Humanities and Social Sciences. In 2000, Rabinowitz completed a Ph.D. in Electrical Engineering with a minor in Aeronautics and Astronautics. He received the Levine Award and Terman Award for outstanding research and academics in the Departments of Physics and the School of Engineering. He was granted a graduate fellowship to the Stanford School of Engineering, where he completed a Ph.D. in Electrical Engineering.

== Career ==
In 1998, Rabinowitz co-founded Panopticon, an intelligent online merchandising company which sold for $100 million in 2000.

In 2000, he founded the Rosum Corporation with the creators of GPS. Under Rabinowitz’ leadership as CEO (and CTO a few years later), Rosum developed a location technology using digital TV signals to augment GPS for positioning indoors and urban areas where GPS signal is inactive.

In 2004, Rabinowitz served for 8 years as a consulting professor in the Stanford School of Engineering, Department of Aeronautics and Astronautics.

Rabinowitz became actively involved in genetics research after events affecting his family. Following advances in the Human Genome Project, in 2005, Rabinowitz founded Natera (NTRA) to deliver a range of prenatal, oncology and organ transplant tests, and genetic counseling services to change the management of disease. Natera’s flagship noninvasive prenatal test, Panorama, has generated roughly 50 peer-reviewed publications and has changed the management of pregnancy while reducing the use of invasive tests like amniocentesis.

Rabinowitz is the co-founder and chairman of MyOme, a health technology company founded in 2017 that aims to reduce medical costs and improve health outcomes using whole genome sequencing (WGS) and polygenic predictive modeling. MyOme is developing a range of WGS-related diagnostics and interventions, such as in-vitro fertilization cycles with whole-genome analysis to aid embryo selection by evaluating polygenic disease models for cancer, autoimmune, cardiovascular, metabolic, and cognitive conditions. MyOme has combined clinical data with whole-genome genetic models that work across diverse ethnicities to enhance risk prediction for breast cancer and other common phenotypes. The company's investors include Sequoia Capital, Founders Fund, Foresite Capital, Healthcare Venture Partners and SoftBank Japan.

Rabinowitz is the founder and executive chairman of NatureEye, a drone technology start-up that provides alternative profit models and anti-poaching tools for wildlife conservancies.

Rabinowitz began as visiting faculty in the Harvard genetic department in 2018 and mentored various projects out of the Wyss Institute at Harvard Medical School. In 2022 he joined one of those projects, Marble Therapeutics, and serves as its executive chairman. The company develops anti-aging therapeutics that leverage gene therapies to modulate gene signaling pathways. Its technology uses chaos theory and nonlinear dynamical modeling of longitudinal genetic data.

== Personal life ==
In 2003, Rabinowitz’s sister gave birth to a baby with Down syndrome who died soon after. Rabinowitz said the experience motivated him to establish a start-up that offered advanced informatics and clinical genetic testing, such as screening tests for women as an alternative to invasive amniocentesis to learn of inherited or genetic disorders early in pregnancy.

== Awards and recognition ==
- MIT Technology Review 35 Innovators Under 35: 2005
- IEEE Scott Helt Memorial Award: 2006
- World Economic Forum Technology Pioneers: 2006 (for Rosum), 2014 (for Natera)
- Edison Awards: 2017, 2018, 2018 (for Natera)
