= Vik Bajaj =

Canadian-American scientist and business executive (born c. 1977)

- Born: Vikram S. Bajaj c. 1977 (age 48–49); Canada
- Occupations: Scientist, business executive
- Years active: 2011-present
- Organization(s): Project Prometheus (CEO), Foresite Labs (CEO)
- Known for: Co-founding Google Life Sciences
- Board member of: Genomics England, Quantum-Si

Vikram Bajaj is a Canadian-American scientist and business executive. He is the co-CEO of Prometheus and CEO of Foresite Labs, early in his career he co-founded Google Life Sciences, later named Verily, where he was chief science officer (CSO) until 2016. He afterwards was CSO of Grail before becoming a managing director at Foresite Capital. Bajaj is also an adjunct professor at Stanford University.

== Early life and education ==
Bajaj was born in Canada of Indian heritage. He graduated with a combined bachelor of arts and master of science degree in biochemistry from the University of Pennsylvania. He then earned his Ph.D. in physical chemistry from the Massachusetts Institute of Technology and completed his postdoctoral research at the University of California, Berkeley.

== Career ==
=== Early research roles ===
The Wall Street Journal has described Bajaj as an expert in areas such as molecular imaging, magnetic resonance imaging (MRI) for diagnostics, the structural biology of neurodegenerative disease, millimeter wave devices, and clinical bioinformatics. In 2011, Bajaj became a research scientist and principal investigator at Lawrence Berkeley National Laboratory, where he was a scientist for seven years. He was also a principal investigator at the University of California, Berkeley.

In 2013, while a researcher at Berkeley's Alex Pines lab, he received the first Anatole Abragam Prize from the International Society of Magnetic Resonance. In September 2014, he became an adjunct associate professor at the Stanford University School of Medicine. From February 2015 to August 2021, he was an advisory board member for the UC Berkeley College of Chemistry.

=== Google Life Sciences and Grail ===
In March 2013, he co-founded Google Life Sciences, a division of the Alphabet research group Google X. Working out of Google's Mountain View campus as Google Life Sciences' chief scientific officer (CSO), Bajaj also held a director role at Google X. According to the New York Times, Bajaj worked closely with Google co-founder Sergey Brin, and was involved in projects such as the drone delivery service Wing, the self-driving car that became Waymo, and the Project Baseline Study. Google Life Sciences was rebranded as Verily in 2015, with Bajaj as founding CSO until October 2016. During this time, he was chair of Verily's scientific advisory board. From 2016 to 2017 he was CSO of Grail, a biotechnology Illumina spinoff. Bajaj was on Grail's scientific advisory board until 2021, when Grail was bought by Illumina for $8 billion.

=== Foresite and Xaira ===
In October 2017, he became a managing director of Foresite Capital, an investment firm. According to Axios, Bajaj's focus at Foresite is identifying companies that "personalize medicine and treatment based on people's individual genetic code." In 2018, he became co-founder and CEO of Foresite Labs.

He joined the board of Genomics England in 2021, and the board of Quantum-Si in June 2022. As of 2022, he was an advisor to the Department of Defense through the Defense Science Board’s Task Force on Biology. Also in 2022, he was an affiliate scientist of the Lawrence Berkeley National Laboratory, an affiliate scientist at the University of California, Berkeley, and on Berkeley's college of chemistry advisory board. He co-founded Xaira Therapeutics, an AI drug discovery company in San Francisco, in January 2023.

=== Prometheus and recent ===
Bajaj was reported as the co-founder and co-CEO of Project Prometheus, an AI startup co-founded by Jeff Bezos, in November 2025. Bajaj is also still Foresite Labs CEO and a professor at Stanford University School of Medicine.

== See also ==
- List of chief executive officers
