= 2013 State of the Union Address =

Speech by US President Barack Obama

- Full video of the speech as published by the White House
- Date: February 12, 2013
- Time: 9:00 p.m. EST
- Duration: 59 minutes
- Venue: House Chamber, United States Capitol
- Location: Washington, D.C.; 38°53′19.8″N 77°00′32.8″W
- Type: State of the Union Address
- Participants: Barack Obama; Joe Biden; John Boehner
- Footage: C-SPAN
- Previous: 2012 State of the Union Address
- Next: 2014 State of the Union Address
- Website: Full text by Archives.gov

The 2013 State of the Union Address was given by the 44th president of the United States, Barack Obama, on February 12, 2013, at 9:00 p.m. EST, in the chamber of the United States House of Representatives to the 113th United States Congress. It was Obama's fourth State of the Union Address and his fifth speech to a joint session of the United States Congress. Presiding over this joint session was the House speaker, John Boehner, accompanied by Joe Biden, the vice president, in his capacity as the president of the Senate.

It was simulcast online by the White House website as an "enhanced version" with accompanying graphics for key points of the address.

== Seating and guests ==
Continuing with the tradition started in 2011, members of the 113th United States Congress sat together regardless of which party they were affiliated with.

=== Guests ===
- John Kitzhaber, governor of Oregon (invited by Michelle Obama)
- Tim Cook, CEO of Apple, Inc. (invited by Michelle Obama)
- Bobak Ferdowsi, Systems Engineer at NASA's Jet Propulsion Laboratory, commonly referred to as the "Mohawk Guy" (invited by Michelle Obama)
- Former Representative Gabby Giffords and her husband former NASA astronaut Mark Kelly (invited by Representative Ron Barber and Senator John McCain, respectively)
- Tracey Hepner, wife of the first openly gay U.S. military general, Brig. Gen. Tammy Smith, and founder of Military Partners and Families Coalition (invited by Michelle Obama)
- Pat Llodra, Newtown, Connecticut first selectwoman, and Detectives Dan McAnaspie and Jason Frank (invited by Sens. Richard Blumenthal and Chris Murphy of Connecticut)
- Ted Nugent (invited by Rep. Steve Stockman)
- Cleopatra Cowley-Pendleton and Nathaniel A. Pendleton Sr., the parents of Hadiya Pendleton, a participant in the 2013 Inaugural Parade who was later shot and killed in Chicago (invited by Michelle Obama)
- Kaitlin Roig, a first-grade teacher who protected 14 students during the Sandy Hook Elementary School shooting in December 2012 (invited by Michelle Obama)

Clinton Romesha, recipient of the Medal of Honor was invited by Michelle Obama, but declined so as to celebrate his wedding anniversary with his wife and friends.

=== Designated survivor ===
The designated survivor is the member of the president's cabinet who does not attend the address in case of a catastrophic event, in order to maintain a continuity of government. The designated survivor for the 2013 State of the Union Address was United States Secretary of Energy Steven Chu.

== Topics ==
Obama's 2013 State of the Union Address was, in the words of CNN's Rebecca Sinderbrand, "a companion to the ideological offensive in his inauguration speech." The New York Times added: "Obama did not match the lofty tone of his inauguration speech, but the address was clearly intended to be its workmanlike companion. In place of his ringing call for a more equitable society was a package of proposals that constitute a blueprint for the remainder of his presidency. Some would require legislation; others merely an executive order." The speech was dominated by domestic issues such as debt & deficit reduction, infrastructure measures, the economy and need to reinvigorate the middle class, gun control, minimum wage, early education and immigration. Obama declared "Together, we have cleared away the rubble of crisis, and we can say with renewed confidence that the state of our union is stronger." But despite this Obama noted that it is now his generation's task to "reignite the true engine of America’s economic growth — a rising, thriving middle class." “Every day,” he said, “we should ask ourselves three questions as a nation: How do we attract more jobs to our shores? How do we equip our people with the skills to get those jobs? And how do we make sure that hard work leads to a decent living?”“We gather here knowing that there are millions of Americans whose hard work and dedication have not yet been rewarded,” Obama said early in his remarks explaining the rationale behind his middle class agenda. “Our economy is adding jobs, but too many people still can’t find full-time employment. Corporate profits have rocketed to all-time highs, but for more than a decade, wages and incomes have barely budged."

During his speech Obama called on Congress to hike the minimum wage to $9 an hour, proposed the addition of three more urban manufacturing hubs and asked Congress "to help create a network of 15 of these hubs and guarantee that the next revolution in manufacturing is made right here in America." He also called on Congress to invest $50 billion on rebuilding roads and bridges and announced a bipartisan commission to improve the voting system. The bipartisan commission has the task to investigate voting irregularities that led to long lines at polling sites in the November 2012 election. Studies indicate that these lines cost Democrats hundreds of thousands of votes. The commission will be led by the chief counsel of the Obama presidential campaign, Robert Bauer, and a legal adviser to Mitt Romney’s campaign, Ben Ginsberg.

Obama proposed universal preschool for 4-year-olds and linking some federal grant decisions to research schools on their ability to keep tuition costs in check. And he urged Congress to put his full gun control agenda (i.e. background checks in all gun sales, the prevention of anyone buying guns for resale to criminals, a ban on semi-automatic weapons that mimic military weapons, and limiting ammunition magazines to 10 rounds) up for a vote. "Senators of both parties are working together on tough new laws to prevent anyone from buying guns for resale to criminals. Police chiefs are asking our help to get weapons of war and massive ammunition magazines off our streets, because these police chiefs, they're tired of seeing their guys and gals being outgunned. Each of these proposals deserves a vote in Congress. They deserve – they deserve a simple vote." Obama used the line "They deserve a vote" four more times than in the prepared remarks in effort to create empathy. The U.S. president proposed to Congress to make high-quality preschool available to every child, provide tax credits for businesses to hire and invest, promote more scientific research and development, further shift cars and trucks away from gasoline, and invest in infrastructure.

Obama called for "modest" reforms to Medicare in his speech, continued his push for Congress to act on immigration reform and proposed a paycheck fairness act intended to make it easier for women to fight salary discrimination without losing their jobs, the development of new alternative energy hubs in the country, and to help people refinance their mortgages at today's lower interest rates. With respect to Medicare he argued that the United States can't just cut its way to prosperity. On climate change, Obama promised executive action if Congress failed to address what he called a litany of evidence that the nation and the world face such as more frequent and powerful storms, wildfires and drought: "If Congress won't act soon to protect future generations, I will," he said. "I will direct my Cabinet to come up with executive actions we can take, now and in the future, to reduce pollution, prepare our communities for the consequences of climate change, and speed the transition to more sustainable sources of energy." Obama thus advocated a transition to more sustainable and environment-friendly sources of energy, such as wind and solar, in order to reduce America's dependence on oil. Obama also proposed the creation of an Energy Security Trust dedicated to shifting the country's cars and trucks off oil. "We can choose to believe that Superstorm Sandy, and the most severe drought in decades, and the worst wildfires some states have ever seen were all just a freak coincidence. Or we can choose to believe in the overwhelming judgment of science and act before it's too late."

"It is our unfinished task to restore the basic bargain that built this country – the idea that if you work hard and meet your responsibilities, you can get ahead," the president said. "It is our unfinished task to make sure that this government works on behalf of the many, and not just the few." Obama said that deficit reduction alone is not an economic plan. "A growing economy that creates good, middle-class jobs – that must be the North Star that guides our efforts." Obama's State of the Union address included a call to "set party interests aside, and work to pass a budget that replaces reckless cuts with smart savings and wise investments in our future." "And let's do it without the brinksmanship that stresses consumers and scares off investors," he continued to applause, mainly from Democrats. "The greatest nation on Earth cannot keep conducting its business by drifting from one manufactured crisis to the next. We can't do it. Let's agree, right here, right now, to keep the people's government open, and pay our bills on time, and always uphold the full faith and credit of the United States of America." "Nothing I'm proposing tonight should increase our deficit by a single dime." Obama said. "It's not a bigger government we need, but a smarter government that sets priorities and invests in broad-based growth."

On foreign policy Obama announced in the context of the withdrawal of U.S. troops from Afghanistan that he would bring home half of all U.S. troops by February 2013 and end the war there the following year. Barack Obama called for a free trade agreement between the United States and the European Union and announced his intent to complete negotiations on a "Trans-Pacific partnership". He also addressed drone oversight, the 2013 North Korean nuclear test, Iran's nuclear program and the Middle East in the context of the Syrian Civil War. Obama warned the North Korea's reclusive government that it faced further isolation, swift retaliation and a United States bent on improving its own missile defense systems. He spoke about the reduction of nuclear stockpiles in cooperation with Russia: "We'll engage Russia to seek further reductions in our nuclear arsenals and continue leading the global effort to secure nuclear materials that could fall into the wrong hands." "In defense of freedom, we'll remain the anchor of strong alliances, from the Americas to Africa, from Europe to Asia. In the Middle East, we will stand with citizens as they demand their universal rights, and support stable transitions to democracy."

Obama called for lawmakers to work together to be more effective by successfully solving problems regardless of party divisions: "The American people don't expect government to solve every problem. They don't expect those of us in this chamber to agree on every issue. But they do expect us to put the nation's interests before party." Obama closed his speech with a reference to his second inaugural address ending by saying that all Americans share the same title: "We are citizens. It's a word that doesn't just describe our nationality or legal status. It describes the way we're made. It describes what we believe. It captures the enduring idea that this country only works when we accept certain obligations to one another and to future generations; that our rights are wrapped up in the rights of others; and that well into our third century as a nation, it remains the task of us all, as citizens of these United States, to be the authors of the next great chapter in our American story."

== Responses ==
Senator Marco Rubio, a Republican of Florida, delivered the official Republican response to the 2013 State of the Union Address in both English and Spanish. Kentucky Republican Senator Rand Paul delivered the Tea Party movement's rebuttal to Obama's 2013 State of the Union Address. The official Libertarian response was given by Carla Howell, executive director of the Libertarian National Committee. The official Green Party response was given by Jill Stein, the party's 2012 presidential candidate.

The BBC reported reactions from U.S. newspapers, including The New York Times and The Washington Post. Additional reactions from U.S. newspapers were assembled by the website al.com.

| Preceded by 2012 State of the Union Address | State of the Union addresses 2013 | Succeeded by 2014 State of the Union Address |
