= Esteban González Burchard =

American physician-scientist

Esteban González Burchard is an American physician-scientist, a UCSF Distinguished, Endowed, Tenured Professor of Pharmacy and Medicine, Pulmonary & Critical Care Physician-Scientist trained in Genetics, Immunology, Epidemiology, Pharmacogenetics, and clinical phase 1 trials. A specialist in gene-environment interactions in asthma and health disparities.

== Education and early life ==
Esteban Gonzalez Burchard received his M.D. at Stanford University School of Medicine in 1995. He completed his internship and residency in internal medicine at Harvard's Brigham and Women’s Hospital. He completed his specialty training in Pulmonary/Critical Care Medicine at the University of California, San Francisco, and clinical research from the Harvard School of Public Health. Esteban Gonzalez Burchard earned his master’s in public health in epidemiology from University of California, Berkeley in 2006.

== Career ==
Burchard is a distinguished professor in the Schools of Pharmacy and Medicine at UCSF, after beginning his career there in 2001.

Burchard studies gene-environment interactions in asthma, especially in children, and health disparities in the US. As part of this work, he founded and directs the largest study of asthma in minority children in the United States, called the Asthma Translational Genomics Collaborative. This study involves whole genome sequencing of more than 15,000 people. He is involved in the All of Us Initiative at the US National Institutes of Health. He uses his personal experience as a Mexican-American scientist to enhance his research.

== Awards, honors, and major lectures ==
- Harry Wm. and Diana V. Hind Distinguished Professor in Pharmaceutical Sciences, UCSF, 2013
- Member, Precision Medicine Initiative Working Group of the Advisory Committee to the NIH Director, 2015
- Lifetime Achievement Award, National Medical Association (NMA), Allergy and Immunology Section, 2018
