= Strategies for International Development =

US-based non-profit organization

- Founded: 1991
- Type: Nonprofit organization
- Location: 330 Pennsylvania Avenue SE, Suite 304, Washington, DC, 20003
- Key people: Charles A. Patterson (Executive Director), Paul Moorehead (President of the Board of Directors), Judith R. Russo (Program Director)
- Website: sidworld.org

Strategies for International Development (SID) is a U.S. 501(c)(3) nonprofit that designs, proves, and promotes better methods for helping poor farmers make the transition from subsistence to successful commercial farming. SID helps farmers conserve the land upon which their livelihoods depend, while they also increase their income. They also help them adopt business practices and make better business decisions. In addition, they ensure equal participation of women in all project activities and benefits.

== Methodology ==
75% of the world’s poor are small farmers making the transition from subsistence to successful commercial farming. However, agricultural extension reaches, at best, 15% of these farmers at any given time. In every region of every developing country there are hundreds of communities and thousands of farm families.

Fortunately, farmers in many of these regions produce a common cash crop, and SID is applying a regional approach that gives the majority of them a chance to graduate from poverty.

SID’s regional approach combines the methods of the health sector’s successful child survival program and Everett Rogers’ theory of the diffusion of agricultural innovations.

To reduce infant mortality, health projects defined the practices parents needed to adopt. Projects used every method available to broadcast knowledge of these practices and encourage their adoption. Knowledge increased; adoption followed; and infant mortality fell from 350 to 50 per thousand.

Rogers’ theory states that farmers adopt innovations at different rates. 16% are early adopters; 34% the early majority; 34% the late majority; and 16% laggards. The early majority follows the example of the early-adopters, and the late majority follows the example of both the early-adopters and early majority.

SID uses five major activities to combine the health sector’s methods and Rogers’ theory.

1. Farmers define the practices they need to adopt in order to graduate from poverty with the common cash crop. Agricultural and environmental technicians are there to make sure farmers do not miss any key practices, but the farmers take the lead.

2. Local officials, schoolteachers, radio stations, and others promote widespread knowledge of the practices and encourage their adoption. The practices become common knowledge and expected behavior.

3. SID conducts demonstration fairs in the practices. Farmers see and try their hand at the practices, and they become palpable and acceptable.

4. SID provides technical assistance in adopting the practices in communities that agree to adopt all of them. The "early-adopter" farmers conserve land, increase productivity, price, and income from the common cash crop, and become examples for others to follow.

5. SID also helps women in early-adopter communities to set personal goals, solve common problems, make business plans, and learn the best practices for second businesses. The personal growth and business growth encourage and reinforce each other and generate equality as well.

== Program Operations ==
=== Guatemala - 18,380 Arabica Coffee Farming Families Graduate from Poverty ===
SID work in Alta Verapaz, the poorest of Guatemala's 22 departments. Alta Verapaz has 26% of Guatemala’s coffee producers, but only 4.41% of national production. Farmers are poor because they have low productivity and they do not husk their coffee. They earn $106 a year from their coffee when they could earn at least $700.

SID started this project in 2019. Since then, the general population has increased their knowledge of the practices they need to adopt from 12% to 51% and their adoption from 12% to 42%.

The first group of 715 families receiving technical assistance have increased their income from a baseline of $106 a year to $842. The second group of 477 families have increased their income to $432. And the third group of 2,165 families have increased their income to $346.

Nearly 2,000 women evaluated their personal growth in six areas: capacity to speak in public; confidence to speak in public; empowerment; leadership; equal participation in the technical assistance in coffee; and equal participation in building a coffee-producing business. They used a five-step Likert scale to do so, and they increased their competence from 20% to more than 80%. They also started second businesses which earn $200 to $300 a year.

=== Uganda - 13,000 Robusta Coffee Farming Families Graduate from Poverty ===
SID works in 5 sub-counties of Luweero District, where farmers produce 452 Kilos of coffee per acre when the minimum for good coffee farming is 2,250 Kilos. 18% sell fresh cherries for the lowest price; 69% sell dry cherries for a better price; but only 13% husk their dry cherries and sell the beans directly to exporters. Average income is $397 per year when it could be more than $1,000.

In the first year of the project, the general population increased their knowledge of the practices they need to adopt from 56% to 69% and their adoption from 25% to 29%.

1,677 farm families in 115 villages receiving technical assistance increased their productivity from 113 to 127 kilos per 1/4 acre of coffee, sold more coffee in dried cherries, and had some modest increases in price. As a result, they increased their income from $397 to $512.

60% to 77% of the women in the technical assistance villages rated themselves as none (0%) and another 20% to 34% rated themselves as A Little (25%) on the six indicators of personal growth. The activities to increase their growth have begun.

=== Malawi - 7,000 Dairy Farming Families Graduate from Poverty ===
SID works in the Central Region of Malawi where dairy farmers have the best opportunity to graduate from poverty. They have more land for producing fodder than dairy farmers in other regions. They are also close the major market of the city of Lilongwe, the nation’s capital.

The dairy farmers are poor because their cows produce 9 or 10 liters per cow per day when they could produce 20, and only produce milk for 210 days a year when they could increase their production to 240 days. Farmers earn $200 per year when they could earn $700.

This project started in September 2023. SID is helping 1,780 dairy farmers to grow Lucerne trees and Rhodes Grass for better cattle feed. They have doubled the number of trained Artificial Insemination technicians, and the breeding of the cows is improving. Farmers have also begun improving the health of their cows. And SID is helping farmers who do not yet have cows to prepare applications for cows to the Agricom Project funded by the World Bank.

== Awards ==
In 2005, SID was awarded as winners of the World Bank Development Marketplace Competition for a project in Bolivia entitled "Competing to Reclaim Eroded Soils and Pastures."
