= Emily Muller =

American activist

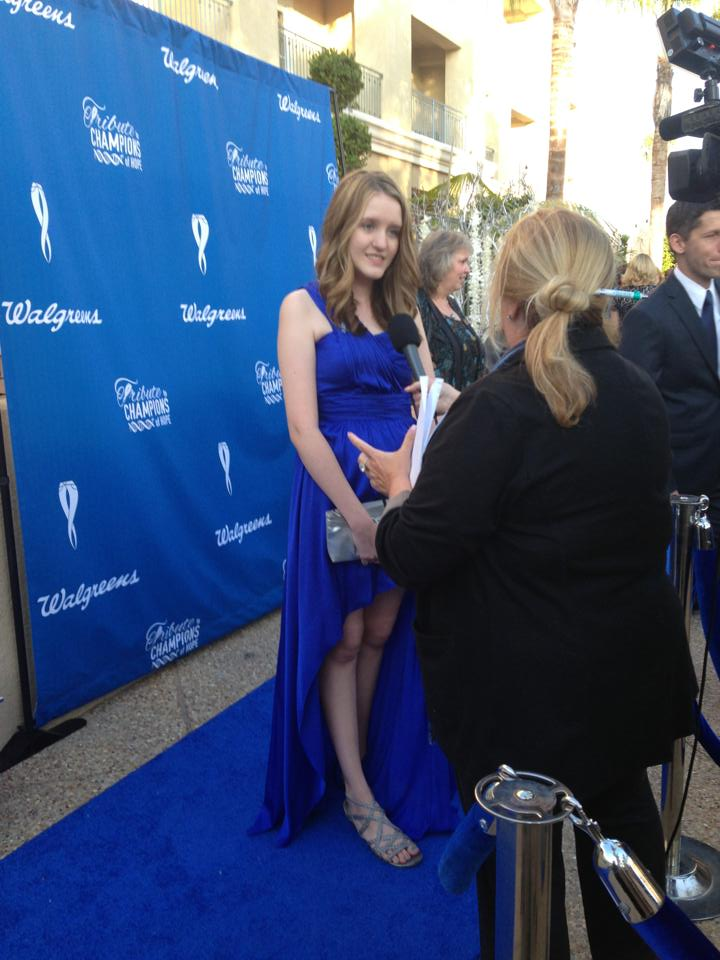
- Born: April 4, 1999 (age 26); Chicago, Illinois
- Known for: Activism; Speeches
- Movement: CuresNow
- Website: https://emilysfight.com

Emily Muller (born 4 April 1999) is a disability rights activist from Chicago. Her focus revolves largely around psychosocial issues that impact seriously ill children and young adults, and legislation that affects rare disease patients. She began her activism at the age of thirteen after creating the website Emily's Fight. She has spoken at events such as the SHINE conference, Starlight Midwest Gala, Nikki Rich premiere, Rare Disease Legislative Advocates, and has given a TEDx Talk. She is also a contributor to The Mighty. During the summer of 2016 she advocated the passage of the 21st Century Cures Act by using Internet activism in support of the bill. When the 21st Century Cures Act passed the Senate in 2016, Muller was recognized by the United States House Committee on Energy and Commerce for her work promoting the legislation.

== Filmography ==
=== Television ===
Year	Title	Role	Notes
2016	Shameless	Woman With Walker	Episode: #AbortionRules
