= Asha Collins =

American clinical biologist, strategist

- Born: Detroit, Michigan, U.S.A
- Education: University of Pittsburgh (B.S.); University of Wisconsin-Madison (Ph.D.)

Asha Collins is a clinical biologist, strategist, and researcher. She is best known for her work in biopharmaceutical operations and currently serves as the general manager of Biobanks for DNAnexus, a venture-backed, cloud-based bioinformatics company.

== Biography ==
Collins was born and raised in Detroit. She received her bachelor's degree in Biological Sciences from the University of Pittsburgh and later graduated from the University of Wisconsin-Madison with her PhD in Cancer Biology and Microbiology. Collins served as the Vice President of U.S. Clinical Trial Sourcing at McKesson Corporation and a manager at Deloitte, where she introduced a newly structured operating model and led the redesign of a company-wide clinical trial process, respectively.

She later began a new project in clinical development to help improve health service accessibility in Ethiopia by helping to establish a clinical research center focused on mental health studies. At Genentech Dr. Collins served as the United States Head of Country Clinical Operations, where she led the team responsible for performing late phase clinical trials for U.S. locations.

From August 2021 through December 2024, she led Biobanks analytics for DNAnexus as the General Manager, she is responsible for managing the development and commercialization of large, population-scale, biomedical research analysis platforms. She also leads the team scaling the UK Biobank Research Analysis Platform.

Dr. Collins serves as the Diversity Advisory Board Chair for the Translational Research Institute for Space Health (TRISH), an organization that helps support human health research for NASA’s space exploration efforts.

An advocate for women entrepreneurs, Collins is an angel investor and at Pipeline Angels. She is also a fellow of the Aspen Institute Health Innovators Fellowship and is a board member of both the Healthcare Businesswomen’s Association and IDEXX Laboratories Inc.

She is Co-Author of the best-selling new release in medical technology and medical informatics, Mobile Medicine: Overcoming People, Culture, & Governance.

== Selected publications ==
- Kwong, L., Wozniak, M. A., Collins, A. S., Wilson, S. D., & Keely, P. J. (2003). R-Ras promotes focal adhesion formation through focal adhesion kinase and p130(Cas) by a novel mechanism that differs from integrins. Molecular and cellular biology, 23(3), 933–949.
- Cox, G. M., Sansjofre, P., Blades, M. L., Farkas, J., & Collins, A. S. (2019). Dynamic interaction between basin redox and the biogeochemical nitrogen cycle in an unconventional Proterozoic petroleum system. Scientific reports, 9(1), 5200.
- Collins, A. S., Ahmed, S., Napoletano, S., Schroeder, M., Johnston, J. A., Hegarty, J. E., O'Farrelly, C., & Stevenson, N. J. (2014). Hepatitis C virus (HCV)-induced suppressor of cytokine signaling (SOCS) 3 regulates proinflammatory TNF-α responses. Journal of leukocyte biology, 96(2), 255–263.
- Merte, J. L., Kroll, C. M., Collins, A. S., & Melnick, A. L. (2014). An epidemiologic investigation of occupational transmission of Mycobacterium tuberculosis infection to dental health care personnel: infection prevention and control implications. Journal of the American Dental Association, 145(5), 464–471.
- Collins, Asha S.; Liebelt, Kate (2021-09-28), "Cultivating Belonging and Creating Access: A Chapter on Diversity, Equity, and Inclusion", Mobile Medicine, New York: Productivity Press, pp. 237–246, doi:10.4324/9781003220473-19, ISBN 978-1-003-22047-3
