= Prometheus (company) =

American artificial intelligence company

- Industry: Artificial intelligence
- Founded: November 2025; 12 months ago
- Founders: Jeff Bezos; Vik Bajaj
- Headquarters: San Francisco, California, United States
- Key people: Jeff Bezos (co-CEO); Vik Bajaj (co-CEO)
- Number of employees: 250

Prometheus (formerly Project Prometheus) is a US-based artificial intelligence (AI) startup.

== History ==
It was founded by Jeff Bezos in November 2025, who will serve as co-chief executive. The project will launch with $6.2 billion in funding, partly from Bezos. Vik Bajaj, a chemist and physicist formerly of Google X who is the co-founder and CEO of AI-incubator Foresite Labs, is the startup's co-founder and co-chief executive.

Prometheus is based in San Francisco, with offices in London and Zurich. In August 2026, the San Francisco Business Times reported that the company had signed a lease for a former American Steel warehouse in West Oakland. As of December 2025, the project had hired over 120 employees, including researchers poached from AI firms xAI, Meta, OpenAI, and DeepMind.

Among other things, the company plans to use AI technology to improve engineering and manufacturing in the fields of computing, aerospace, and automobiles. It intends to apply AI to physical tasks; this requires systems that can learn not just from massive amounts of digital data, as LLMs are programmed to do, but also from real-world trial and error.

In November 2025, Project Prometheus acquired General Agents, an agentic AI start-up.

As of 2026, the Prometheus group is also seeking large-scale funding for a holding company that would acquire companies that Bezos and Bajaj anticipate will be hit by industrial AI technology.

The company changed its name from Project Prometheus to Prometheus in 2026.

In a November 2026 interview with Semafor, Jeff Bezos said that the company had raised more than US$14 billion.

== See also ==
- Applications of artificial intelligence
- Comparison of computer-aided design software
- List of artificial intelligence companies
- List of computer-aided engineering software
