= Asian Pacific American Medical Student Association =

US student organization

- 美國亞太裔醫學生協會 (Chinese); 美国亚太裔医学生协会 (Chinese); 아시안 의대생 협회 (아팸사) (Korean); アジア太平洋米国医学生団体 (Japanese); Hiệp hội sinh viên y khoa người Mỹ Châu Á - Thái Bình Dương (Vietnamese); एशियाई प्रशांत अमेरिकी मेडिकल छात्र संघ (Hindi); Asosiasi Mahasiswa Kodekteran se-Asia Pasifik Amerika Serikat (Indonesian)
- Abbreviation: APAMSA
- Formation: 1995
- Founder: Dr. B Ulysses K. Li Dr. Jhemon Lee
- Type: Student-governed organization
- Location: United States
- Members: 4,000
- Official language: English
- National President: Victoria Shi
- Affiliations: National Council of Asian Pacific Islander Physicians (NCAPIP)
- Website: www.apamsa.org

The Asian Pacific American Medical Student Association (APAMSA), founded in 1995, is the largest medical organization in the US representing Asian American, Native Hawaiian, and Pacific Islander (AANHPI) medical and pre-medical students and physicians. APAMSA is a student-governed and national organization that promotes awareness and advocacy of issues affecting the AANHPI community. They have over 4,500 active medical students, pre-medical students, interns, medical residents, and practicing physicians.

APAMSA hosts an annual National Conference, annual National Hepatitis Conference, and multiple Regional Conferences. The 2023 National Conference was hosted at Oregon Health & Sciences University on March 3–5.

Currently, APAMSA has over 160 local chapters at different medical schools and college campuses in the United States.

== Previous work ==
Disparities in Medical Education: In 2007, APAMSA conducted a national study to reveal racial and ethnic disparities in medical school grades during clinical years. The study demonstrated that minorities receive lower grades than white medical students. This study served to show the possibility that cultural factors may play a role in medical school grades during clinical years. In 2009, APAMSA followed up with a second study to examine medical student communication styles. The study concluded that there were differences in student communication styles and feedback based on demographic differences suggesting a need for cultural competency training for both medical student and teacher.

Bone Marrow Drive: During the Presidential Inaugural Committee's National Day of Service, APAMSA helped organize the Gift of Hope, Gift of Unity Marrow Drives in Washington DC and in California with Yul Kwon and the national bone marrow programs: NMDP, AADP (Asian American Donor Program), A3M, and SAMAR. In 2009, APAMSA also launched the 1000 CRANES for HOPE Campaign to register at least 1000 minorities onto the National Bone Marrow Registry.

Hepatitis B: Since 2006, APAMSA has contributed to help raise awareness about hepatitis B and liver disease in the APA community by Hepatitis B, APAMSA Fights to Break the Hepatitis B Cycle. This campaign brought together a national cross section of medical students and physicians dedicated to ending the epidemic of hepatitis B in APA community, and the launching of several local hepatitis B education and screening programs across the United States.

Japan Tsunami Relief: In 2011 in response to the devastating earthquake and tsunami in Japan, APAMSA chapters throughout the United States raised a combined total of over $11,000 which was ultimately donated to aid the recovery effort in Japan. The Albert Einstein College of Medicine was recognized as the top fundraiser in the effort as they raised a total of $6508.32.

AllofUs Research Initiative: In 2018, APAMSA was chosen as one of only two national AANHPI-serving organization partners in the Asian Engagement and Recruitment Core (ARC) for the All of Us Research Program (AoURP). With the assistance of the ARC, students and community members were enrolled at local health fairs and community events to be a part of the program and increase AANHPI representation in the AoURP for future clinical trials and biomedical research.

== Current National Initiatives ==
- Hepatitis B and C Initiative and Conference
- Community Outreach Initiative
- Bone Marrow Initiative
- Cancer Initiative
- Research Initiative
- Academic Education Initiative
- Professional Development and Leadership Initiative
- Premedical Students Initiative
- Diversity Initiatives (South Asian, Southeast Asian, LGBTQIA+, Native Hawaiian and Pacific Islander, Women in Medicine)
- Alumni Initiative
- Medical Education Initiative
- Health Policy and Advocacy Initiative

== History ==
APAMSA officially started in 1995 by Dr. B Li and his colleagues with the first National Conference after they were worried about the future of APA medical students and communities. Since then, APAMSA has grown to include many National Programs including the Hepatitis B education and immunization project and the Bone Marrow Donation project.

As an organization based on health care, APAMSA has also held role in speaking out for smoking and tobacco use targeting the Asian community, for alcohol use, for immunization and for health standards addressing needs of the medically underserved. So far efforts have been made regarding smoking and alcohol consumption, along with related chronic illnesses, have been on the rise in Asian youth since 2003.

== National conferences ==
Initially, National Conference was a one-day event, usually held on a Saturday. Occasionally, there has been expansion to 2–3 days with additional pre-conference activities the Friday afternoon/night before (Pre-Med Day, Anti-Racism Workshop) or the following Sunday (closed National Board transition orientation).

At the 26th National Conference (2019), the first "Alumni Day" was held with good turn out from local physicians and healthy discussion on how to best support the next generation of Asian American health professionals. In 2024, APAMSA will celebrate its 30th Annual National Conference.

=== Historical national conferences ===
#	Year	Month	Title	City	Organized by	Website
4	2023	Mar	RENEWAL : Out of the Flames, Into the Future	Portland, OR	Oregon Health and Sciences University	https://www.apamsa.org/nc2023/
8	2022	Jan	ROOTS: Preserving Our History and Cultivating a Brighter Future	Columbus, OH	The Ohio State University	https://www.apamsa-nc2022.org/
27	2021	Jan	Agents of CHΔNGE: Celebrating Resilience, Addressing Inequities, and Marching Forward	Virtual	UCSF	https://www.2021apamsaconference.org/
26	2019	Oct	The Land of Opportunity: Breaking the Barriers in APIA Healthcare	New York	New York University, Touro COM NY	https://www.2019conference.apamsa.org/
25	2018	Oct	The Plurality of Others	St Louis	WashU, SLU	2018conference.apamsa.org
24	2017	Oct	Caring for Communities	Los Angeles	UCLA	2017conference.apamsa.org
23	2016	Oct	Promoting Wellness from Within	Chicago	Rush, Pritzker	2016conference.apamsa.org
22	2015	Sep	Intersections in Healthcare	Irvine	UCI	2015conference.apamsa.org
21	2014	Sep	Remedies for Disparities	Las Vegas	Touro Nevada	2014conference.apamsa.org
20	2013	Oct	Breaking the Silence in APIA Health	New York	Columbia, Einstein, Sinai	2013conference.apamsa.org
19	2012	Sep	Connect the Dots, Make Your Mark: An Interdisciplinary Approach to Medicine	Ann Arbor	UMich	http://www.apamsa.org/wp-content/uploads/2013/05/APAMSA-Program.pdf
18	2011	Oct	Prescription for Change: Act Now	Stanford	Stanford	
17	2010	Oct	Navigating Medicine's Next Frontier	Baltimore	Hopkins, UMaryland	
16	2009	Oct	Transforming Medicine: A Challenge for Future Leaders	Los Angeles	UCLA, Western, USC	
15	2008	Oct	Building ONE Community	Philadelphia	UPenn	
14	2007	Oct	Bridging Cultures, Taking Action	San Francisco	UCSF, Stanford	
13	2006	Oct	Medicine: A Call to Service	Washington DC	Uniformed Services UHS	
12	2005	Oct	Building Bridges: Linking Past, Present, and Future	Chicago	Northwestern	
11	2004	Oct	Leading by Example	Houston	UT Houston, Baylor, UTHSC San Antonio	
10	2003	Nov	Changing the Face of Medicine	Washington DC	Georgetown, GWU, Hopkins	
9	2002	Oct	Our Culture, Our Health	St Louis	WashU, UMKC	
8	2001	Oct	Forging into the Next Millennium: Commitment to API Service	New York	NYU, Einstein	
7	2000	Oct	Ancient Traditions, New Frontiers	Los Angeles	USC, Stanford	
6	1999	Nov	?	San Francisco	UC Davis	
5	1998	Nov	?	Chicago	Northwestern, UIC, Finch, Pritzker	
4	1997	Oct	?	Columbus	OSU	
3	1996	Oct	APA Leaders: Forging Ties for a Stronger Tomorrow	Boston	Harvard	
2	1995	Oct	Strength Through Unity	Philadelphia	MCPH, Temple, Jefferson, UPenn	
1	1995	Jan	(1st National Conference) Reflections on Self and Community	New York	Columbia, Cornell, Einstein, SUNY Brooklyn, Mt Sinai, NYU	
	1995	Jan	National APAMSA incorporated	New York	Columbia, Cornell, Einstein, SUNY Brooklyn, Mt Sinai, NYU	
	1994	Oct	AAMSNet launches	Columbus	OSU	
	1994	Oct	White House Briefing on Health Care Reform	Washington DC	Delegates from Harvard, Tufts, NYU	
	1994	Oct	A New Voice	Boston	Harvard	
	1994	Apr	Asian American Caucus at AMSA	Washington DC	CWRU, Stanford	
	1993	Oct	Asian American Family Health: Needs and Networks	Columbus	OSU	
	1993	Oct	Breaking the Silence	Boston	Harvard	
	1993	Apr	Asian American Caucus at AMSA	Miami	WI (?)	
	1993	Jan	A Call for Community Involvement	New York	NYU	

== Historical national presidents ==
Academic Year	President
2024–2025	Victoria Shi (UMKC)
2023–2024	Joyce Lee (MCW)
2022–2023	Donna Tran (MSU CHM/Hopkins)
2021–2022	Donna Tran (MSU CHM/Hopkins)
2019–2021	Yingfei Wu (MCW/Hopkins), Interim President Donna Tran (MSU CHM/Hopkins)
2018–2019	Yingfei Wu (MCW/Hopkins)
2017–2018	Ruey Hu (Vanderbilt/Hopkins), Interim Leader Yingfei Wu (MCW/Hopkins)
2016–2017	Ruey Hu (Vanderbilt/Hopkins)
2015–2016	Kevin Riutzel (Touro Nevada COM)
2014–2015	Kevin Riutzel (Touro Nevada COM)
2013–2014	Kevin Riutzel (Touro Nevada COM)
2012–2013	Tracy Wang (Hopkins)
2011–2012	Jason Chen (Vanderbilt)
2010–2011	Lynne Chang (UCLA), now Lynne Wu
2009–2010	Sam Li (UT Houston)
2008–2009	Shelly Choo (Hopkins)
2007–2008	Grace Wang (Hopkins)
2006–2007	Kathy Lee (WashU)
2005–2006	Kathy Lee (WashU)
2004–2005	Rishi Agrawal (UT Houston)
2003–2004	Lisa Tseng (UCLA)
2002–2003	Celeste Chu (Wash U St Louis)
2001–2002	Sunny Ramchandani (Yale/Harvard)
2001	Vivienne Hau (Univ of Arizona)
2000–2001	Chris Tsai (Columbia)
1999–2000	Bena Teo (UIC)
1998-1999	Albert Hsu (Einstein)
1997-1998	David Wong (OSU)
1996-1997	Sean Wu (Duke)
1995-1996	Lawrence Cheung (Columbia)
1995	Anu Gupta (Yale)
