= All of Us (initiative) =

United States NIH research program

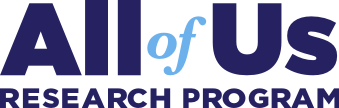
- Headquarters: Bethesda, Maryland, United States
- Parent organization: National Institutes of Health (NIH)
- Website: allofus.nih.gov

The All of Us Research Program (previously known as the Precision Medicine Initiative Cohort Program) is a precision medicine research program created in 2015 under the Obama Administration with $130 million in funding to accelerate health and medical breakthroughs, enable individualized prevention, treatment and care.

The project aimed to collect genetic and health data from one million volunteers, and recruited around 297,549 participants. The project says its data is analyzed by 2,300 researchers.

== Program ==
The initiative was announced during the 2015 State of the Union Address, and is run by the National Institutes of Health (NIH). The program is bilingual, with information and materials available in Spanish and English.

=== Enrollment ===
Eligible adults (18 and over) can enroll with the program. People who are not eligible are those in prison or people who cannot consent on their own According to a sample consent form released in June 2018, participation in All of Us is voluntary and does not affect a participant's medical care. The form explains that if a participant quits the program, their samples will be destroyed. Children may also be able to enroll in the program.

By January 2018 an initial pilot project had enrolled about 10,000 people and 2022 was targeted for one million people. As of May 2019, enrollment numbers at the one-year launch anniversary are 187,000+ participants. More than 132,000 have already given biosamples.

The NIH reported in May 2018 that they were pleased with the high enrollment by underrepresented groups including communities of color and individuals with lower incomes. Up to three-quarters of beta phase participants came from those communities.

=== Program partners ===
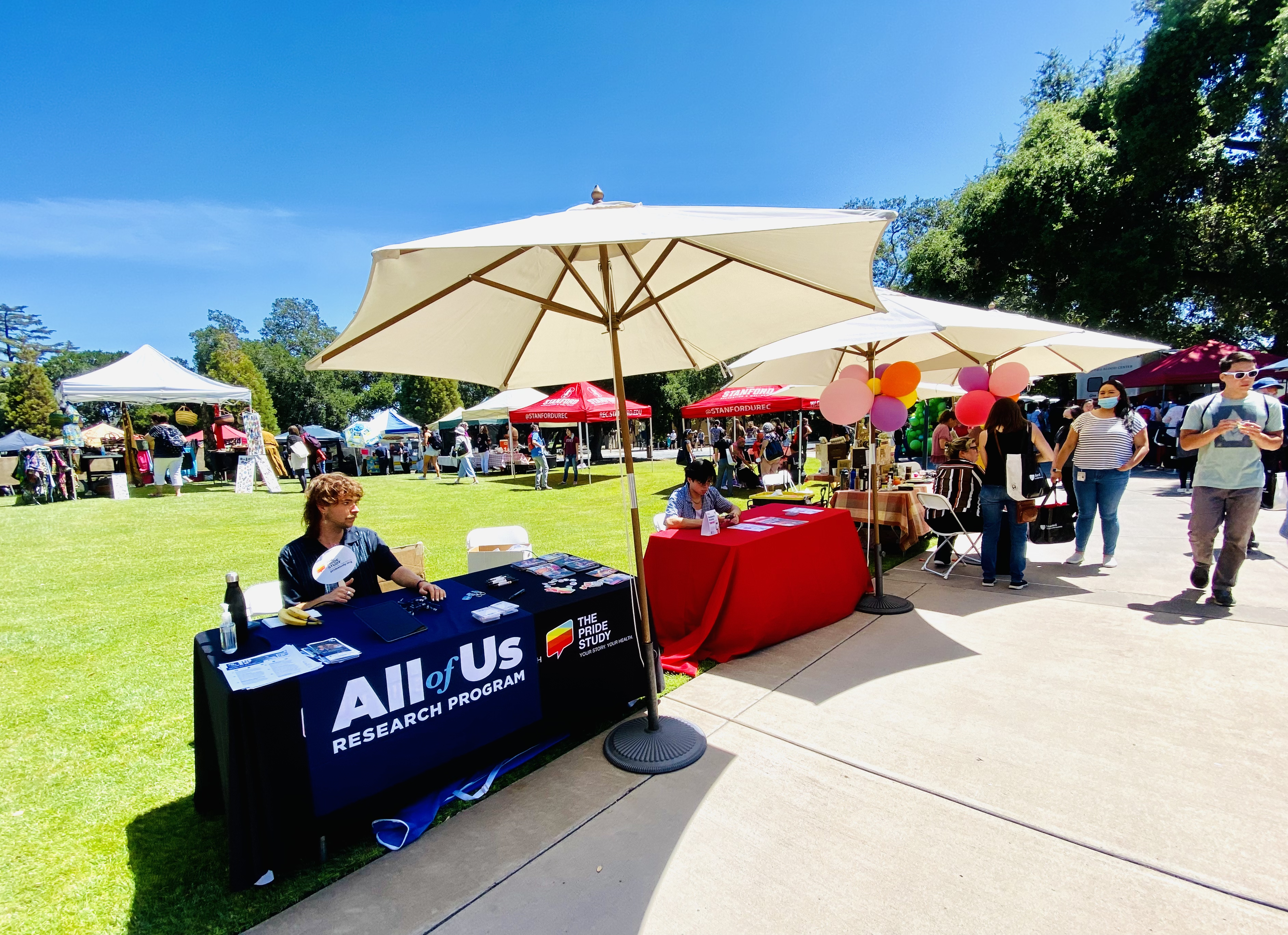

All of Us has more than 100 partners working to implement and support the mission and goals of the research. Google life sciences startup Verily Life Sciences, a Google "moonshot" with a goal of "transform[ing] the way we detect, prevent, and manage disease" is one partner. The initiative was identified by a 2019 review as involving the public in every stage of the research.

=== Program budget ===
The All of Us Research Program budget has increased every year since it launched: FY2016 - $130 million; FY2017 - $230 million; and FY2018 - $290 million.

== Program progress ==
=== Enrollment ===
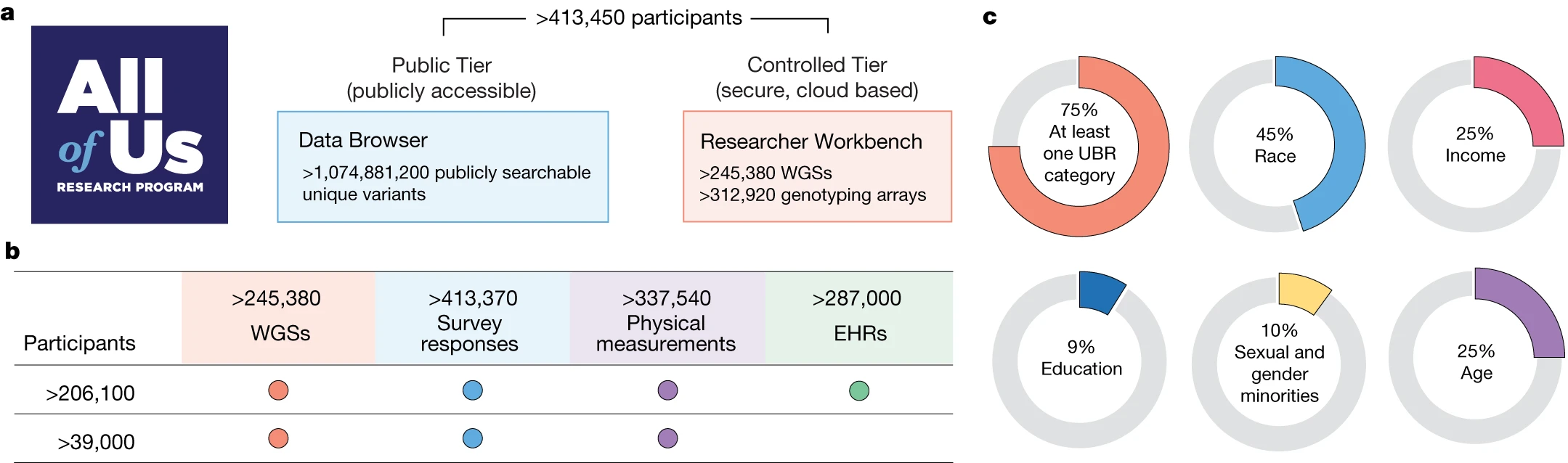
Summary of All of Us data resources (Note: "a, The All of Us Research Hub contains a publicly accessible Data Browser for exploration of summary phenotypic and genomic data. The Researcher Workbench is a secure cloud-based environment of participant-level data in a Controlled Tier that is widely accessible to researchers. b, All of Us participants have rich phenotype data from a combination of physical measurements, survey responses, EHRs, wearables and genomic data. Dots indicate the presence of the specific data type for the given number of participants. c, Overall summary of participants under-represented in biomedical research (UBR) with data available in the Controlled Tier.")

The research program was launched for national enrollment on May 6, 2018. In the summer of 2019, one year after its official launch, All of Us had enrolled 230,000 participants, which represents almost one quarter of the program's goal of 1,000,000 individuals. Approximately 80% of those people are from groups that have been traditionally underrepresented in biomedical research. One of All of US's main goals is to include many people from diverse ancestries. By June 2020, enrollment reached approximately 350,000 individuals.

=== All of Us Researcher Workbench ===
On May 27, 2020, the All of Us research program announced the launch of their research platform, the All of Us Researcher Workbench, for beta testing. Select data collected by the initiative, including electronic health records and survey responses from the first 225,000 program participants, will be available to approved researchers through the workbench. Researchers may apply for access to the data if they have an NIH eRA Commons account (for identity verification) and are affiliated with an institution that has signed a data use agreement with All of Us.

=== Response to COVID-19 pandemic ===
In June 2020, the NIH announced that research materials collected as part of the All of Us initiative will be used to address the COVID-19 pandemic. Blood samples collected from recent volunteers will be tested for SARS-CoV-2 antibodies in order to track prior infections within the US population. Electronic health records shared by All of Us participants will also be evaluated for potential patterns associated with SARS-CoV-2 infection. All of Us also added monthly participant surveys with questions about the physical, mental, and socioeconomic impacts of the COVID-19 pandemic.

=== Administration ===
The founding program director was Eric Dishman, who stepped down to become the Chief Innovation Officer. In 2019, Joshua Denny was selected to be the second director. In October 2016, the project was renamed "All of Us".

== Publications ==
All of us Continental genetic ancestry
- Figure 2 with Principal Components Analysis

The project published in Nature in 2024, linking electronic health records to genomics data in some participants. The paper uses a uniform manifold approximation and projection algorithm.

Genetics of the participants were published in a 2025 Nature Communications article. The 2025 paper shows various principal components analysis projections of the biobank's genetic diversity.

== Criticism ==
Professor Kenneth Weiss from Pennsylvania State University, in a skeptical review of this project in 2017, suggested that the funding could be better spent elsewhere.

=== Joseph Yracheta ===
Joseph M. Yracheta is a researcher studying health disparities, and a co-founder and executive director of the Native BioData Consortium (NBDC), a biobank containing samples collected from indigenous people and led by indigenous scientists. Himself a member of the Pūrepecha Indigenous group, he is a noted skeptic of the 'All of Us' initiative and its benefit to Native American tribes. As part of his work with the NBDC, he has collected genetic samples from members of a Native American tribe in the Northern Plains.

== See also ==
- 100,000 Genomes Project (UK)
- 21st Century Cures Act
- Baseline Study
- Precision medicine
- precisionFDA
