= 2014 State of the Union Address =

Speech by US President Barack Obama

- Full video of the speech as published by the White House
- Date: January 28, 2014
- Time: 9:00 p.m. EST
- Duration: 1 hour, 5 minutes
- Venue: House Chamber, United States Capitol
- Location: Washington, D.C.; 38°53′19.8″N 77°00′32.8″W
- Type: State of the Union Address
- Participants: Barack Obama; Joe Biden; John Boehner
- Footage: C-SPAN
- Previous: 2013 State of the Union Address
- Next: 2015 State of the Union Address
- Website: Full text by Archives.gov

The 2014 State of the Union Address was given by the 44th president of the United States, Barack Obama, on January 28, 2014, at 9:00 p.m. EST, in the chamber of the United States House of Representatives to the 113th United States Congress. It was Obama's fifth State of the Union Address and his sixth speech to a joint session of the United States Congress. Presiding over this joint session was the House speaker, John Boehner, accompanied by Joe Biden, the vice president, in his capacity as the president of the Senate.

According to tradition, House Speaker John Boehner invited the president on December 13 to address a joint session of Congress. White House Press Secretary Jay Carney confirmed the president's attendance later that day.

== Topics addressed ==
Obama promised to raise the minimum wage to $10.10 for federal contractors and to work with states, local governments, and private groups as well as Congress, to raise the minimum wage nationally, arguing better pay is needed to support the economy as well as the right thing to do.

Additional featured proposals included:

- further improvements in providing Americans health care;
- enacting immigration reform;
- a smarter national security approach including the war on terror and the war in Afghanistan (the longest U.S. war);
- moving the country off of a permanent war footing while laying out his case for "strong and principled diplomacy";
- calling for Congress to give U.S. diplomats some room to maneuver, particularly when it comes to Iran; and
- improvements to education to ready Americans for the jobs of tomorrow's economy.

== Designated survivor ==
The designated survivor is the member of the president's cabinet who does not attend the address in case of a catastrophic event, in order to maintain continuity of government. The designated survivor for the address was Secretary of Energy Ernest Moniz.

== Responses ==
Representative Cathy McMorris Rodgers of Washington, the highest-ranking female Republican in the U.S. House of Representatives, delivered the Republican Party response to President Obama's statement. The decision was made by House Speaker John Boehner and Republican Senate Leader Mitch McConnell. Representative Ileana Ros-Lehtinen of Florida, the first Cuban-American person elected to Congress, gave a second response, delivering most of McMorris Rodgers' response in Spanish. In addition, Utah Senator Mike Lee gave an address in response to Obama's speech on behalf of the Tea Party Express. Kentucky Senator Rand Paul released his own address on YouTube and Facebook. He had previously given a response on behalf of the Tea Party Express in 2013. The four Republican responses were interpreted as a sign of the party's ideological divisions.

== See also ==
- 2014 United States House of Representatives elections

Preceded by 2013 State of the Union Address	State of the Union addresses 2014	Succeeded by 2015 State of the Union Address
