= 2010 State of the Union Address =

Speech by US President Barack Obama

- Full video of the speech as published by the White House
- Date: January 27, 2010
- Time: 9:00 p.m. EST
- Duration: 1 hour, 9 minutes
- Venue: House Chamber, United States Capitol
- Location: Washington, D.C.; 38°53′19.8″N 77°00′32.8″W
- Type: State of the Union Address
- Participants: Barack Obama; Joe Biden; Nancy Pelosi
- Footage: C-SPAN
- Previous: 2009 Joint session speech
- Next: 2011 State of the Union Address
- Website: Full text by Archives.gov

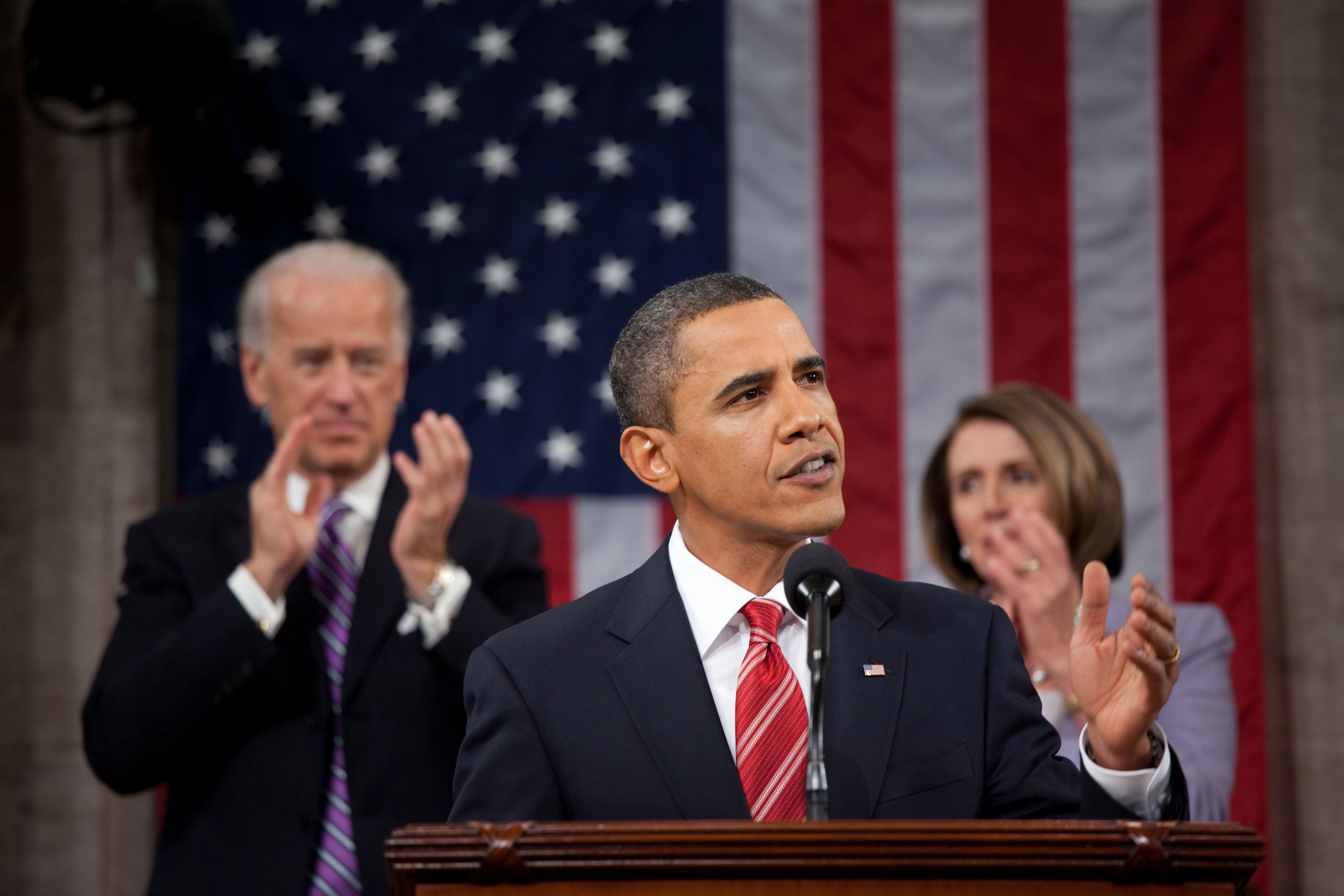
President Obama delivering the State of the Union address to the U.S. Congress

The 2010 State of the Union Address was given by the 44th president of the United States, Barack Obama, on January 27, 2010, at 9:00 p.m. EST, in the chamber of the United States House of Representatives to the 111th United States Congress. It was Obama's first State of the Union Address and his second speech to a joint session of the United States Congress. Presiding over this joint session was the House speaker, Nancy Pelosi, accompanied by Joe Biden, the vice president, in his capacity as the president of the Senate.

The theme for President Obama's speech was “Rescue, Rebuild, Restore – a New Foundation for Prosperity”. Among the topics that Obama covered in his speech were proposals for job creation and federal deficit reduction.

Newly inaugurated Virginia Governor Bob McDonnell delivered the Republican response following the speech from the floor of the House of Delegates at the Virginia State Capitol in front of over 300 people.

== Legislative initiatives and policies ==
The following items were mentioned by the President as potential policy changes, legislative initiatives, or goals coming out of the address:

- Fees on the country's largest banks (to follow up on the Troubled Asset Relief Program (TARP))
- Giving $30 billion from recovered TARP money to community banks to extend credit to small businesses
- Job creation
  - Building clean energy facilities
  - Giving rebates to Americans who make their homes more energy-efficient
  - Slash tax breaks for companies that send jobs overseas (giving those breaks to companies that create jobs in the U.S.)
- Encourage American innovation (focus on clean energy)
  - Building nuclear power plants
  - Exploring off-shore areas for oil and gas
  - Investment in advanced biofuels and clean coal technologies
  - Comprehensive energy and climate bill to make clean energy profitable
- More exports of goods (goal: double exports in 5 years)
  - Launch of a National Export Initiative
- Invest in the skills and education of our people
  - Renew the Elementary and Secondary Education Act
  - Revitalize community colleges
  - Ending taxpayer subsidies to banks for student loans
  - $10,000 tax credit for families for four years of college
  - Increase Pell Grants
  - Only 10% of income to student loans
  - All student loan debt forgiven after 20 years, or after 10 years if they choose a career in public service
  - Cost cutting at colleges and universities
- Middle Class
  - Nearly double the child tax credit
  - Giving access to a retirement account for every worker
  - Expanding the tax credit for those who start a nest egg (retirement fund)
  - Refinancing to make more mortgages affordable
- Tackling childhood obesity (headed by the First Lady, Michelle Obama)
- Health care reform
- Deficit reduction
  - Starting in 2011, freeze government spending for 3 years on discretionary programs (excluding national security, Medicare, Medicaid, and Social Security)
  - Eliminate programs that are unaffordable or don't work
  - Extend middle-class tax cuts
  - Bipartisan fiscal commission to provide solutions (created by Executive Order, if necessary)
  - Restoring pay-as-you-go law
- Require lobbyists to disclose every contact they make
- Limits on contributions that lobbyists give to candidates
- Reform for earmarks, publish them in a single location on the web
- Crack down on violations of equal pay laws
- Immigration reform
- Repealing Don't ask, don't tell policy within the year to allow homosexuals to serve in the military openly
- Treating the nation of Israel with respect

== Supreme Court Justices' response ==
During the address, Obama condemned the Citizens United v. Federal Election Commission ruling, stating, "Last week, the Supreme Court reversed a century of law that I believe will open the floodgates for special interests – including foreign corporations – to spend without limit in our elections." Justice Samuel Alito was seen frowning and mouthing the words "not true" when Obama criticized the Supreme Court.

Chief Justice John Roberts later commented on the subject at the University of Alabama, saying, "The image of having the members of one branch of government standing up, literally surrounding the Supreme Court, cheering and hollering while the court – according to the requirements of protocol – has to sit there expressionless, I think is very troubling."

In response to Roberts, Justice Breyer said he would continue to attend the address: "I think it's very, very, very important—very important—for us to show up at that State of the Union, because people today are more and more visual. What [people] see in front of them at the State of the Union is that federal government. And I would like them to see the judges too, because federal judges are also a part of that government."

== Technical information ==
Housing Secretary Shaun Donovan was chosen as the designated survivor and did not attend the address, in order to keep a presidential line of succession should a catastrophic event have wiped out the administration. Secretary of State Hillary Clinton was also out of the country at the time of the address for a conference in London regarding the country of Yemen and the upsurge in terrorist activity in that country.

== Republican response ==
The Republican response to the State of the Union Address was delivered by Bob McDonnell who had been sworn in as the Governor of Virginia 11 days before. McDonnell sought to replicate the trappings State of the Union Address by giving a speech in the chamber of the Virginia House of Delegates with the audience filled with his supporters and included shots of McDonnell entering the chamber while shaking hands as he walking down the aisle. He also selected ten guests to stand behind him as he delivered the speech, including a member of the armed forces wearing his uniform that critics alleged to be a violation of military regulations. In addition, the use of House chamber for McDonnell's speech did not comply with House Rule 82. In his prepared text, McDonnell stated, "Today, the federal government is simply trying to do too much."

== Scheduling ==
Originally, the White House was considering two dates for the State of the Union Address: January 26 and February 2. Were the latter date selected, ABC would have then preempted the already scheduled premiere of the sixth and final season of the TV series Lost, sabotaging months of promotion for "The Final Season" and forcing some awkward rescheduling of the season, which had no leeway for interruptions. This prompted an online protest among fans and the story was picked up by dozens of media outlets. On January 8, White House press secretary Robert Gibbs announced "I don't foresee a scenario in which millions of people who hope to finally get some conclusion with Lost are preempted by the president", to which the show's co-creator Damon Lindelof responded via his Twitter account with "OBAMA BACKED DOWN!!!! Groundhog Day is OURS!!!!!!! (God Bless America)".

Ben East of the United Arab Emirates The National newspaper summed up the story with "confirmation of just how important [Lost] is came with an almost unbelievable communiqué from the White House last week ... That's right. Obama might have had vital information to impart upon the American people about health care, the war in Afghanistan, the financial crisis—things that, you know, might affect real lives. But the most important thing was that his address didn't clash with a series in which a polar bear appears on a tropical island. After extensive lobbying by the ABC network, the White House surrendered."

== See also ==
- 2010 United States House of Representatives elections

Preceded by 2009 joint session speech	State of the Union addresses 2010	Succeeded by 2011 State of the Union Address
