= Joshua Denny =

American physician and medical researcher

Joshua Charles Denny is an American physician and medical researcher who is the chief executive officer of the All of Us research program at the National Institutes of Health, where he has worked since 2020. He previously served as Professor of Biomedical Informatics and Medicine, founding Director of the Center for Precision Medicine, and Vice President for Personalized Medicine at Vanderbilt University Medical Center. He is an elected member of the National Academy of Medicine, the American Society for Clinical Investigation, and the American College of Medical Informatics.
