= DNAnexus =

American healthcare data analysis company

- Founded: 2009
- Products: Data analysis and management solutions for molecular data
- Website: www.dnanexus.com

DNAnexus is an American company that provides data analysis and management solutions for molecular data and healthcare data. It is based in Mountain View, California, and was founded in 2009 by Stanford University professors Serafim Batzoglou and Arend Sidow and Stanford computer scientist Andreas Sundquist.

The company provides users with a centralized infrastructure for omics data management, workflow automation, artificial intelligence, security, compliance, and access controls to enable collaborative science. DNAnexus’ customers include pharmaceutical companies, health systems, diagnostics companies, biobanks and government agencies.

== History ==
DNAnexus was founded in early 2009 as a spin-off from Stanford University to address the need for computing infrastructure in DNA sequence analysis. The company raised $1.55 million in venture capital funding from First Round Capital, K9 Ventures, and SoftTech VC.

In April 2010, DNAnexus launched its cloud-based sequence data service.

In October 2011, DNAnexus announced that it had raised $15 million from Google Ventures, TPG Biotech, First Round Capital, SoftTech VC, K9 Ventures, and Felicis Ventures.

In October 2013, the company announced a collaboration with the Human Genome Sequencing Center at Baylor College of Medicine. Through the partnership, DNAnexus and scientists at Baylor performed the largest cloud-based genomics analysis to date, processing 3,751 whole human genomes and 10,771 exomes. Analysis was run using Amazon Web Services infrastructure and conducted for the Cohorts for Heart and Aging Research in Genomic Epidemiology (CHARGE) consortium. The effort used 2.4 million core-hours of computational time and generated 430 terabytes of data.

The company announced a series C venture funding round of $15 million in January 2014. Investors included Claremont Creek Ventures, First Round Capital, Google Ventures, and TPG Biotech.

In October 2014, DNAnexus announced their platform would power novel genomic collaborations between the Regeneron Genetics Center (RGC) and leading healthcare providers. This collaboration would result in the industry's first cloud-based genome center to integrate next-generation sequencing with de-identified clinical records in what was described as “the largest clinical sequencing undertaking in North America.”

DNAnexus was awarded a research and development contract by the U.S. Food and Drug Administration’s Office of Health Informatics to build precisionFDA to support the White House’s Precision Medicine Initiative in 2015 to review the current regulatory landscape and develop a streamlined approach to evaluating NGS-based diagnostics. precisionFDA is an open source platform connecting test developers and the FDA, enabling test developers to independently evaluate the accuracy and reproducibility of NGS analysis workflows and to securely share results with collaborators and the FDA. DNAnexus and the FDA expanded their collaboration in 2019 through a five-year, $20 million contract.

In 2017, Rady Children’s Institute for Genomic Medicine (RCIGM) adopted the DNAnexus Platform to enable the world’s fastest whole genome data analysis pipeline for pediatric care settings. The DNAnexus Platform was used to securely bank genomic data, enable work with RCIGM’s collaborators, and integrate with the Institute’s custom portal and big-data platform.

DNAnexus partnered with City of Hope to provide their platform capabilities as part of POSEIDON, the Precision Oncology Software Environment Interoperable Data Ontologies Network. DNAnexus features allow researchers to explore, analyze, and visualize de-identified clinico-omic data from patients and public data sources. These features support drug development, provide clinical decision support, and facilitate clinical trials.

In June 2020, DNAnexus announced the closing of a $100 million financing round to advance the company’s growth and expansion in clinical diagnostics, pharmaceuticals, and medical centers. The financing was led by Perceptive Advisors and Northpond Ventures, joining existing investors GV, Foresite Capital, TPG Inc., and First Round Capital, and first time equity investor Regeneron Pharmaceuticals. DNAnexus built on this with an additional funding round of $200 million in March 2022, to accelerate the global adoption of the company’s technology and translate the world’s complex multi-omics and clinical data into tangible insights and personalized treatments. The round was led by funds managed by Blackstone Growth (BXG), with participation from existing investors Northpond Ventures, GV, Perceptive Advisors, Innovatus Capital Partners, and Foresite Capital.

DNAnexus announced a partnership with Oracle with the goal of connecting their respective ecosystems. The two companies announced that DNAnexus’ genomics data infrastructure will be integrated with Oracle Health EHR in September 2025. This collaboration will enable healthcare professionals to access and interpret genomic data alongside patient medical history.

== Technology ==
DNAnexus uses cloud computing from Amazon Web Services, and Microsoft Azure. Customers of DNAnexus use those computational resources to transform data into structured and queryable datasets, coordinate analysis tools, AI models, and compliance across a customers’ global data ecosystem, and have defined roles and data standards across analysis pipelines for omics and real-world data.

The DNAnexus Platform is compliant with the latest regulations, standards, and industry frameworks including receiving the FedRAMP moderate certification from the HHS in October 2018, HIPAA, CLIA, GxP, and ISO 27001.

In February 2012, the company announced a partnership with Geisinger Health System and the University of California, San Francisco, to develop the DNAnexus technology for application in clinical medicine. In September 2013, the company began offering its cloud-based platform-as-a-service to clinical testing laboratories for DNA sequence data analysis.

In June 2013, DNAnexus started a program to help software developers build applications that can be used on its platform.

At the beginning of 2015, Natera and DNAnexus partnered to release a customized global cloud solution for laboratories built on the DNAnexus Platform. The DNAnexus platform supported data analysis, storage, and sharing for Natera’s genetic tests.

DNAnexus partnered with Deloitte to enhance the precisionFDA “Collaborative Omics Environment in the Cloud” by upgrading the platform’s sponsor-reviewer interaction, adding support for multi-omics, and offering a library of analytical, statistical, and machine learning applications.

In October 2018 the company announced DNAnexus Apollo, an enhanced platform for clinico-genomic data science exploration, analysis, and discovery. DNAnexus Apollo was developed for global pharmaceutical R&D teams to leverage in their translational informatics research to rapidly test multiple hypotheses and gain valuable insight into mechanisms of action, biomarkers, and targets.
