= Rescue of Jessica Buchanan and Poul Hagen Thisted =

2012 US special forces raid in Somalia

Operation Octave Fusion
- Part of Operation Enduring Freedom – Horn of Africa
Date	January 25, 2012
Location	12 miles north of Adado, Galguduud, Somalia 6°08′25″N 46°17′32″E
Result	Mission successful: Hostages freed

Belligerents
United States	Somali pirates

Strength
24 DEVGRU operators C-130 Hercules	9 pirates

Casualties and losses
None	9 killed

On January 25, 2012, 24 Navy SEALs from SEAL Team Six Blue squadron, raided a compound 12 miles (19 km) north of the Somali city of Adado, killing nine Somali pirates and freeing American Jessica Buchanan and Dane Poul Hagen Thisted, who had been kidnapped.

== Background ==
In October 2011, Jessica Buchanan and Poul Hagen Thisted, who had been working on a demining project with the Danish Refugee Council, were kidnapped by Somali pirates in Galkayo. Attempts by the Council to enlist local Somali elders and traditional leaders to assist in freeing them were unsuccessful, and the pirates refused an offer of US$1.5 million ransom. Instead they demanded a $45 million ransom. With Buchanan's health declining, U.S. officials decided to launch a raid against the pirates using several different United States special operations forces, including elements of the United States Naval Special Warfare Development Group.

== Raid ==
Early on January 25, 2012, two dozen Navy SEALs parachuted from a C-130 Hercules twelve miles north of the Somali town of Adado, Galguduud, where pirates were holding the pair with the intention of ransoming them. The SEALs then traveled by foot from their drop zone, attacked the compound, and engaged the pirates, killing all nine of them. A first-hand account of the raid appears in former DEVGRU operator Justin K. Sheffield's 2020 book MOB VI: A Seal Team Six Operator's Battles in the Fight for Good Over Evil.

== Aftermath ==
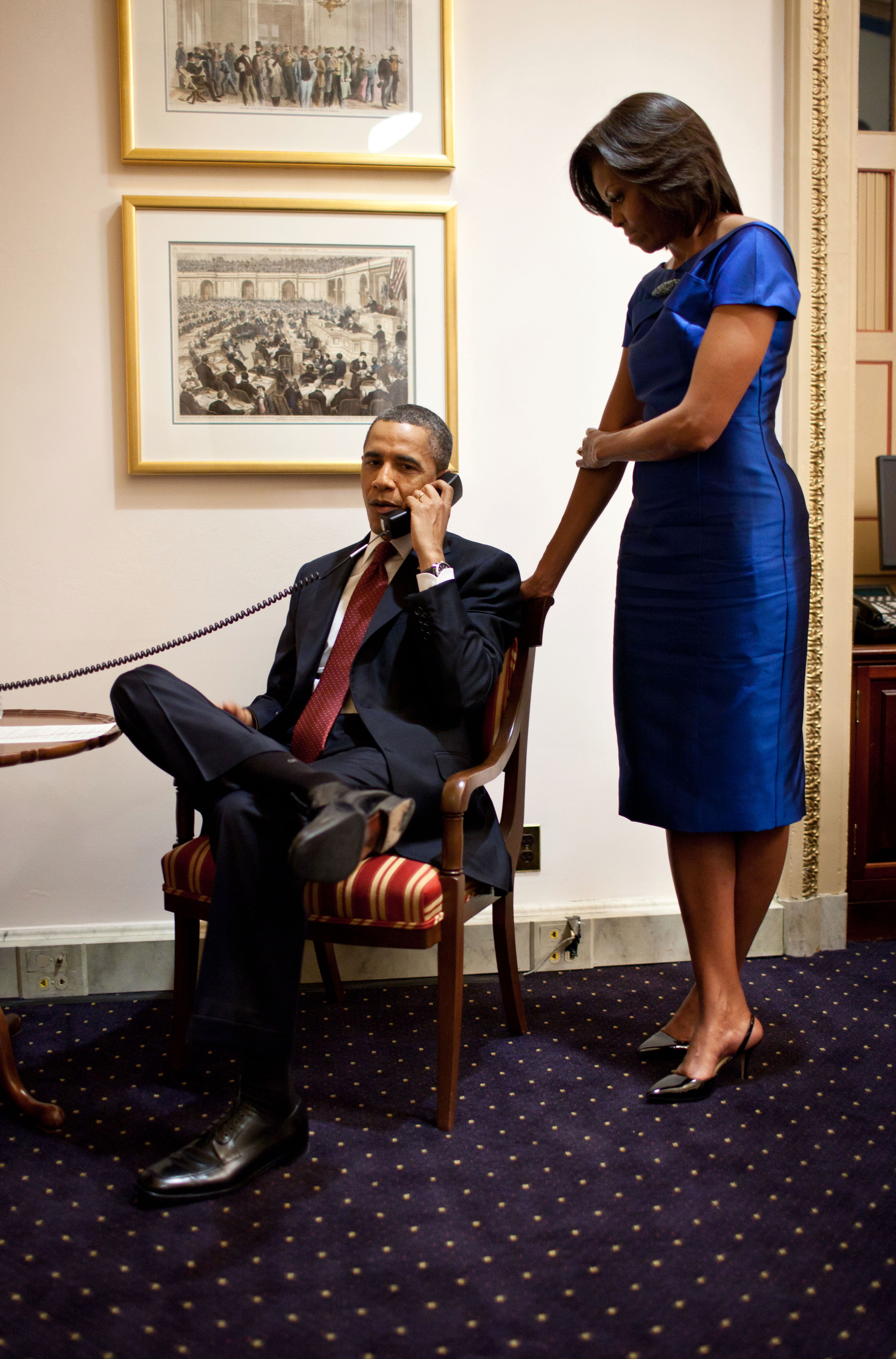
Barack Obama with Michelle Obama informing Buchanan's father that his daughter has been rescued, immediately after the State of the Union Address.

After raiding the pirates' compound and freeing the pair, the U.S. forces returned to their base at Camp Lemonnier in Djibouti. U.S. President Barack Obama congratulated Defense Secretary Leon Panetta before his 2012 State of the Union address, without publicly revealing any details at that time.

Buchanan gave her first interview about being kidnapped with 60 Minutes in May 2013; amongst her first thoughts when kidnapped were that it was too soon to die without having children and saying goodbye to her loved ones. Buchanan and her husband returned to the United States and now have a son and daughter.

== See also ==
- List of kidnappings
- List of solved missing person cases (post-2000)
- List of operations conducted by SEAL Team Six
