= 2012 State of the Union Address =

Speech by US President Barack Obama

- Full video of the speech as published by the White House
- Date: January 24, 2012
- Time: 9:00 p.m. EST
- Duration: 1 hour, 4 minutes
- Venue: House Chamber, United States Capitol
- Location: Washington, D.C.; 38°53′19.8″N 77°00′32.8″W
- Type: State of the Union Address
- Participants: Barack Obama; Joe Biden; John Boehner
- Footage: C-SPAN
- Previous: 2011 State of the Union Address
- Next: 2013 State of the Union Address
- Website: Full text by Archives.gov

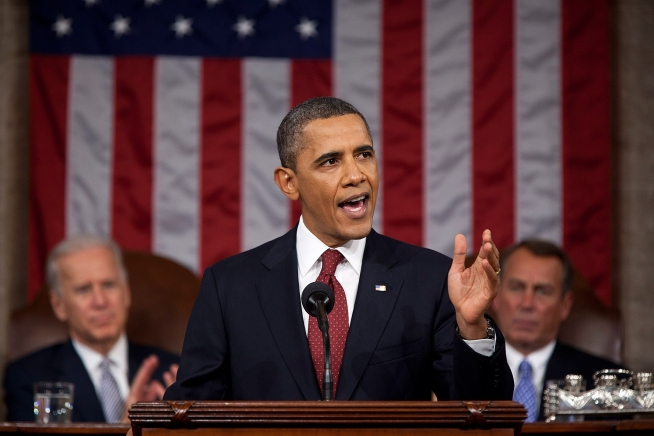
President Obama delivering the State of the Union address to the U.S. Congress

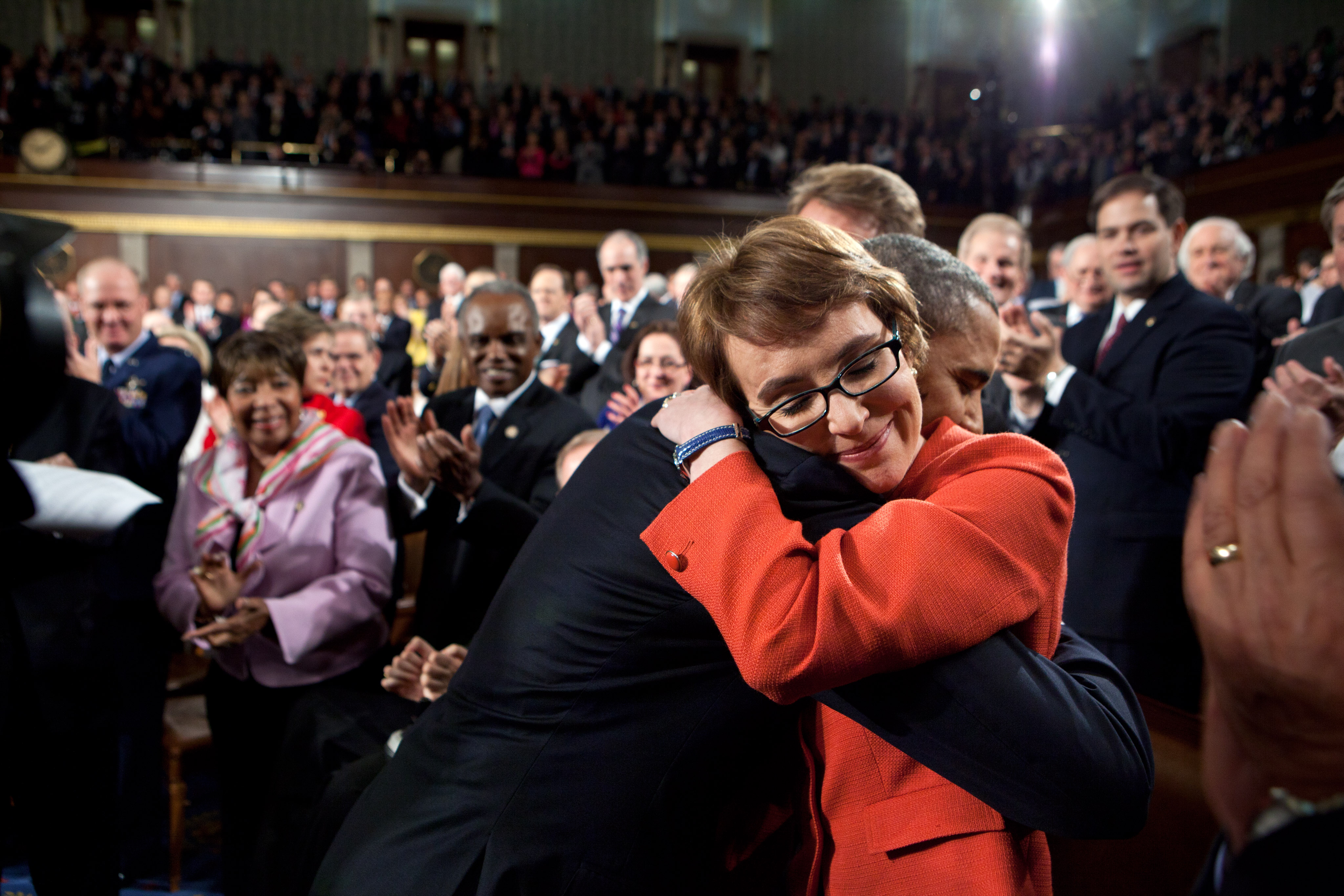
President Obama embracing Congresswoman Gabby Giffords, who was shot in the head in 2011.

The 2012 State of the Union Address was given by the 44th president of the United States, Barack Obama, on January 24, 2012, at 9:00 p.m. EST, in the chamber of the United States House of Representatives to the 112th United States Congress. It was Obama's third State of the Union Address and his fourth speech to a joint session of the United States Congress. Presiding over this joint session was the House speaker, John Boehner, accompanied by Joe Biden, the vice president, in his capacity as the president of the Senate.

In his speech, he focused on education reform, repairing America's infrastructure with money not used on the Iraq War, and creating new energy sources in America.

== Seating and guests ==
In keeping up the tradition that began with the 2011 State of the Union Address, the members of Congress sat with members of the other political party, rather than sitting on separate sides of the room. Arizona Congresswoman Gabby Giffords, who was the victim of an assassination attempt the previous year, was in attendance, as she planned to resign to focus on her rehabilitation from the shooting. President Obama hugged Giffords when he got to her while walking up to the stage, which was met with much applause.

=== Guests ===
In addition to Giffords, other notable guests were invited at the behest of either the White House or the Republican leadership:

- Mark Kelly, astronaut and husband of Giffords (invited by Michelle Obama)
- Laurene Powell Jobs, the widow of Apple Inc. former CEO Steve Jobs (invited by Michelle Obama)
- Mike Krieger, co-founder of Instagram (invited by Michelle Obama)
- Debbie Bosanek, secretary to Warren Buffett (invited by Michelle Obama)
- Julian Castro, mayor of San Antonio, Texas (invited by Michelle Obama)
- Navy Adm. William McRaven, United States Special Operations Command (invited by Michelle Obama)
- Air Force Col. Ginger Wallace, participated in multiple combat and rescue/recovery missions; her female partner was able to attend her promotion ceremony following the repeal of Don't ask, don't tell. (invited by Michelle Obama)
- Dave Delie, President of Welspun Tubular LLC, a subsidiary of Welspun Corp. Ltd, located in Little Rock, Arkansas (invited by Boehner)
- Sen. Chris Langemeier of the Nebraska State Legislature (invited by Boehner)
- Dr. Hiroyuki Fujita, Quality Electrodynamics (QED) Founder, President, CEO and Chairman of the Board (invited by Michelle Obama)

=== Designated survivor ===
The designated survivor is the member of the president's cabinet who does not attend the address in case of a catastrophic event, in order to maintain a continuity of government. The designated survivor for the 2012 State of the Union Address was United States Secretary of Agriculture, Tom Vilsack.

== Summary ==
During his state of the Union Address President Obama mentioned the completed US withdrawal from Iraq, the return of some US troops from Afghanistan and the accomplishments against the Taliban and al-Qaeda including the deaths of Osama bin Laden and Anwar al-Awlaki. Obama underscored Americas commitment to Israel, Americas determination to prevent Iran from getting a nuclear weapon and explained during his Arab Spring section the US position regarding the uprising in Syria by saying: “while it is ultimately up to the people of the region to decide their fate, we will advocate for those values that have served our own country so well. We will stand against violence and intimidation. We will stand for the rights and dignity of all human beings – men and women; Christians, Muslims, and Jews. We will support policies that lead to strong and stable democracies and open markets, because tyranny is no match for liberty.” The president discussed the economic situation in America before and after his Inauguration and said with respect to the Income inequality in the United States and the 2012 presidential election: “We can either settle for a country where a shrinking number of people do really well, while a growing number of Americans barely get by. Or we can restore an economy where everyone gets a fair shot, everyone does their fair share, and everyone plays by the same set of rules.” Obama reiterated his call for Congress to extend the payroll tax cut through the end of the year, a benefit to working-class families, urged Congress in his speech to make college more affordable and warned colleges and universities that they risk losing federal funding if they do not keep tuition costs down. The President called upon Congress to deny tax breaks to companies that outsource and provide a tax credit to companies that bring jobs back into the United States. He also called for better job training and education and proposed to use one half of the savings from the completed Iraq War and the winding down Afghanistan War for public-works projects and the other half for deficit reduction. Obama pushed Congress to make it easier for Americans to refinance their homes if their interest rates are above market rates, by using revenue from the administration's proposed fee on banks to help finance the initiative. During the speech, Obama announced the creation of a Unit on Mortgage Origination and Securitization Abuses, which will operate as part of the Financial Fraud Enforcement Task Force, to investigate misconduct that contributed to the subprime mortgage crisis. The unit will be headed by New York Attorney General Eric Schneiderman. The president also proposed a new trade enforcement unit that would add to the number of government investigators pursuing unfair trade practices and that would be responsible for filing lawsuits against foreign countries, namely China. Obama also renewed his call for the institution of the Buffett Rule, whereby people making more than $1 million a year would pay a minimum effective tax rate of at least 30 percent in income taxes, and to let the high-end Bush-era tax cuts expire. With respect to the Buffet Rule The New York Times reported: "Mr. Obama would like the new tax to replace the alternative minimum tax, which was created decades ago to make sure that the richest taxpayers with plentiful deductions and credits did not avoid income taxes, but which now affects millions of Americans who are considered upper middle class." With respect to Obama's energy policy the NYT wrote that the President will seek an "expansion of domestic energy supplies, both from traditional fuels like oil and natural gas and from cleaner sources like wind and the sun. He singled out the rapid growth of domestic natural gas production through the technique known as hydraulic fracturing, or fracking.", while the Washington Post wrote that Obama would open up new federal land to develop wind farms and solar energy plants to reduce the nation's reliance on foreign oil.

== Responses ==
Mitch Daniels, Governor of Indiana, gave the Republican response after the State of the Union Address. Other group or party responses were presented by former candidate for the Republican presidential nomination Herman Cain on behalf of the Tea Party Express (spoken at the National Press Club) and collective members of Occupy D.C. (using the human microphone). There was also a live online response from the Green Party by presidential candidates Jill Stein and Kent Mesplay.

== See also ==
- 2012 United States presidential election
- Rescue of Jessica Buchanan and Poul Hagen Thisted

| Preceded by 2011 State of the Union Address | State of the Union addresses 2012 | Succeeded by 2013 State of the Union Address |
