= Ruth Rabinowitz =

South African politician and doctor (born 1943)

Member of the National Assembly
- In office 1997 – May 2009

Member of the Senate

Assembly Member for KwaZulu-Natal
- In office May 1994 – 1997

Personal details
- Born: 9 October 1943 (age 83) Springs, Transvaal; Union of South Africa
- Party: Inkatha Freedom Party
- Education: University of the Witwatersrand (MBBCh)

Ruth Rabinowitz (née Zilibowitz; born 9 October 1943) is a South African politician and medical doctor who represented the Inkatha Freedom Party (IFP) in Parliament from 1994 to 2009. She served in the Senate from 1994 to 1997 as a delegate from KwaZulu-Natal, and thereafter she was a member of the National Assembly.

A doctor by profession, Rabinowitz became involved in political activism during the democratic transition as a supporter of federal proposals for post-apartheid South Africa. Through her activism, she encountered Mangosuthu Buthelezi and his party, the IFP, which nominated her as a candidate in the 1994 general election, South Africa's first under universal suffrage. Throughout her three terms in Parliament, Rabinowitz served as the IFP's spokesperson on health and was a consistent critic of President Thabo Mbeki's HIV/AIDS policies. During her third term, she established a non-partisan grouping of MPs to lobby for improved policymaking on renewable energy. She failed to gain re-election in the 2009 general election.

== Early life and career ==
Rabinowitz was born on 9 October 1943 in Springs in the former Transvaal. She is of Jewish origins and the daughter of Lithuanian émigrés. She completed a MBBCh from Witwatersrand University, as well as a diploma in drama teaching from the London Academy of Dramatic Arts. She is a medical doctor by profession, and also practices homeopathic medicine.

After her children finished school and moved overseas, during the early stages of South Africa's democratic transition, Rabinowitz became active in political activism, working under the Democracy Trust to lobby for a federal constitution in post-apartheid South Africa. Her relationship with Mangosuthu Buthelezi of Inkatha (later the IFP) began when he sent her a letter to thank her for her activism.

== Parliament: 1994–2009 ==
=== Senate: 1994–1997 ===
In South Africa's first post-apartheid elections in 1994, Rabinowitz stood as a candidate on the party list of Buthelezi's IFP. According to Rabinowitz, she was not a member of the IFP at the time and did not intend to go into politics, but accepted an invitation to appear on the party list in order to signal her "endorsement" of the party. She was nonetheless elected off the IFP's list to represent the KwaZulu-Natal constituency in the Senate, the upper house of the new South African Parliament.

We worked closely together. I would say that he was the most significant person I've met in my life, outside my personal family. It was such a privilege to meet someone who had been through what he had, with his faith and his deep roots in traditional Zulu culture, which most Whites understand in the most superficial way. I learned so much about the Zulu traditional structures, their values and what they could teach us – its similarity to Judaism. I learned more about the value of being part of a Jewish community through being associated with Zulu people than I had through my conventional, middle-class Jewish life... Buthelezi always called me a Julu – a Jewish Zulu – and often asked me to open [IFP] National Council meetings in Ulundi, by reciting a psalm of David.

— Rabinowitz on her relationship with Buthelezi

In the middle of the legislative term, in 1997, Rabinowitz was transferred to the National Assembly, the lower parliamentary house, where she filled a casual vacancy arising from Walter Felgate's resignation. According to Rabinowitz, she had been deeply disappointed with the content of the final post-apartheid Constitution, adopted in 1996, and, while taking sick leave, had told the IFP that she was not prepared to return to the Senate under the new Constitution, which she believed disempowered the upper house.

=== National Assembly: 1997–2009 ===
Rabinowitz remained in the National Assembly until 2009, gaining election full consecutive terms in 1999 and 2004; she stood as a candidate on the IFP's national party list. In December 2000, Rabinowitz was one of the prominent white figures who signed an open letter which admitted white complicity in apartheid, acknowledged its harms, and acknowledged a "debt to fellow black South Africans", committing the signatories to promoting redress.

Throughout her tenure in Parliament, Rabinowitz served as the IFP's parliamentary spokesman on health, a position she had held since 1994. In that capacity, she was a consistent critic of President Thabo Mbeki's unscientific policies during the HIV/AIDS epidemic. In 2003, she called for doctors to boycott the government's AIDS policy "so that we are not found guilty of complicity with genocide"; In 2005, she said that Mbeki had a "denialist attitude" towards the epidemic. She also argued for greater recognition of practitioners of indigenous medicine.

During her third term in Parliament, Rabinowitz formed a multi-party lobby, the e-Parliament Renewable Energy Activists, which lobbied government to develop a progressive renewable energy policy. In November 2008, the group introduced a private member's bill on feed-in tariffs, sponsored by Rabinowitz, which led the government to promise that it would propose its own strategy within months.

Although Rabinowitz had been in the IFP's ten highest-ranked national candidates in the 2004 election, she was demoted from the party list in the 2009 general election and did not secure re-election to her seat.

== Personal life ==
Rabinowitz married one of her university professors, a surgeon at Baragwanath Hospital in Johannesburg; they had three children.
