= Kenneth M. Weiss =

American geneticist

- Scientific career
- Fields: Anthropology, Genetics
- Workplaces: Pennsylvania State University

Kenneth M. Weiss is the Evan Pugh Professor Emeritus of Anthropology and Genetics and Science at the Pennsylvania State University. His research centers on the evolution of complex human traits, particularly disease-related and complex morphological traits. He is a Fellow of the AAAS.
