= 2011 State of the Union Address =

Speech by US President Barack Obama

- Full video of the speech as published by the White House
- Date: January 25, 2011
- Time: 9:00 p.m. EST
- Duration: 1 hour, 1 minute
- Venue: House Chamber, United States Capitol
- Location: Washington, D.C.; 38°53′19.8″N 77°00′32.8″W
- Type: State of the Union Address
- Participants: Barack Obama; Joe Biden; John Boehner
- Footage: C-SPAN
- Previous: 2010 State of the Union Address
- Next: 2012 State of the Union Address
- Website: Full text by Archives.gov

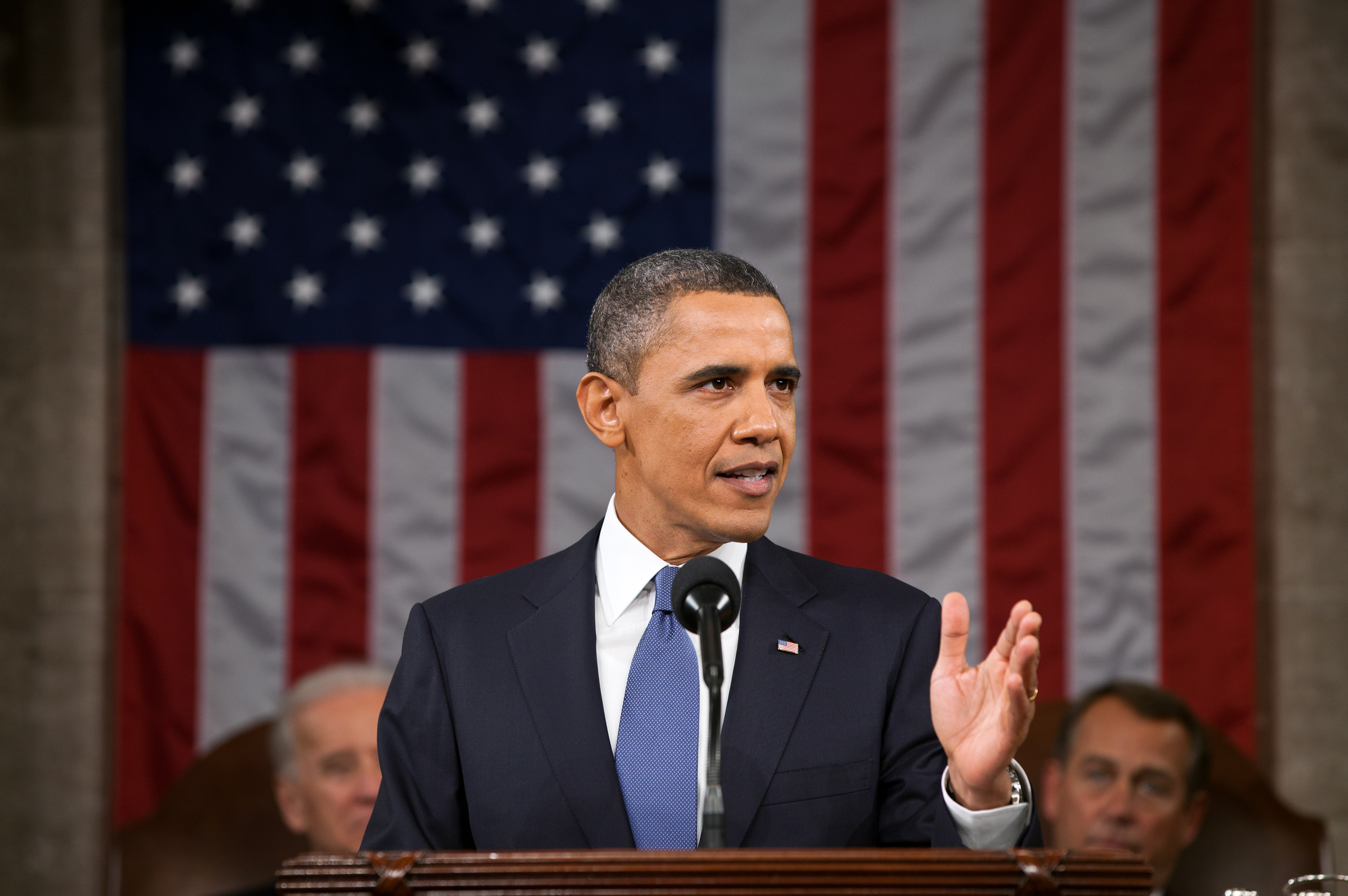
President Obama delivering the State of the Union address to the U.S. Congress

The 2011 State of the Union Address was given by the 44th president of the United States, Barack Obama, on January 25, 2011, at 9:00 p.m. EST, in the chamber of the United States House of Representatives to the 112th United States Congress. It was Obama's second State of the Union Address and his third speech to a joint session of the United States Congress. Presiding over this joint session was the House speaker, John Boehner, accompanied by Joe Biden, the vice president, in his capacity as the president of the Senate.

It was the first address to a Republican-controlled Congress since 2006. It was also the first to be simulcast online as an "enhanced version" featuring accompanying graphics for key points of the address, a style that would be replicated throughout Obama's subsequent State of the Union addresses.

In this joint session Obama outlined his "vision for an America that's more determined, more competitive, better positioned for the future—an America where we out-innovate, we out-educate, we out-build the rest of the world; where we take responsibility for our deficits; where we reform our government to meet the demands of a new age."

== Disposition, seating, and attendance ==
As always, the presiding officers of the Senate and the House of Representatives, Vice President Joe Biden (as Senate President) and House Speaker John Boehner sat behind the president. This is the first time a Republican has sat behind President Obama during a joint session of Congress.

In light of the 2011 Tucson shooting of Representative Gabby Giffords and others, the Washington Third Way think tank sent a letter to Congressional leadership proposing members of Congress abandon a 96-year-long tradition of sitting with their party and instead sit together in a show of national unity. Senator Mark Udall of Colorado picked up Third Way's proposal and sent a letter to Congressional members urging them to sit together regardless of party, breaking with tradition. Sixty members of the House and Senate signaled their support for the plan, and members of both houses sat with members of the opposite party. Groups included Arizona's House delegation of five Republicans and two Democrats (with an empty chair for Giffords), past presidential candidates John Kerry and John McCain, and campaign leaders John Cornyn and Patty Murray. Legislators wore black-and-white ribbons in honor of the victims of the shooting.

After visibly reacting to President Obama's criticism during the 2010 State of the Union of the Citizens United decision, Supreme Court Justices Samuel Alito, Antonin Scalia, and Clarence Thomas did not attend the speech. Secretary of the Interior Ken Salazar served as the designated survivor and did not attend the speech.

=== Other guests ===
Other notable guests included:

- Salvatore Giunta, Medal of Honor recipient and U.S. Army veteran of the War in Afghanistan (invited by Michelle Obama)

== Summary ==
According to a White House fact sheet published by NMD Newswire US-President Obama underscored in his 2011 State of the Union Address "the need to maintain America's leadership in a rapidly changing world so that our economy is competitive – growing and working for all Americans." In order to achieve this Obama outlined "a plan to help the United States win the future by out-innovating, out-educating, and out-building our global competition. At the same time, the President understands the need to reform the way our government does business and take responsibility for our deficit - by investing in what makes America stronger and cutting what doesn't."

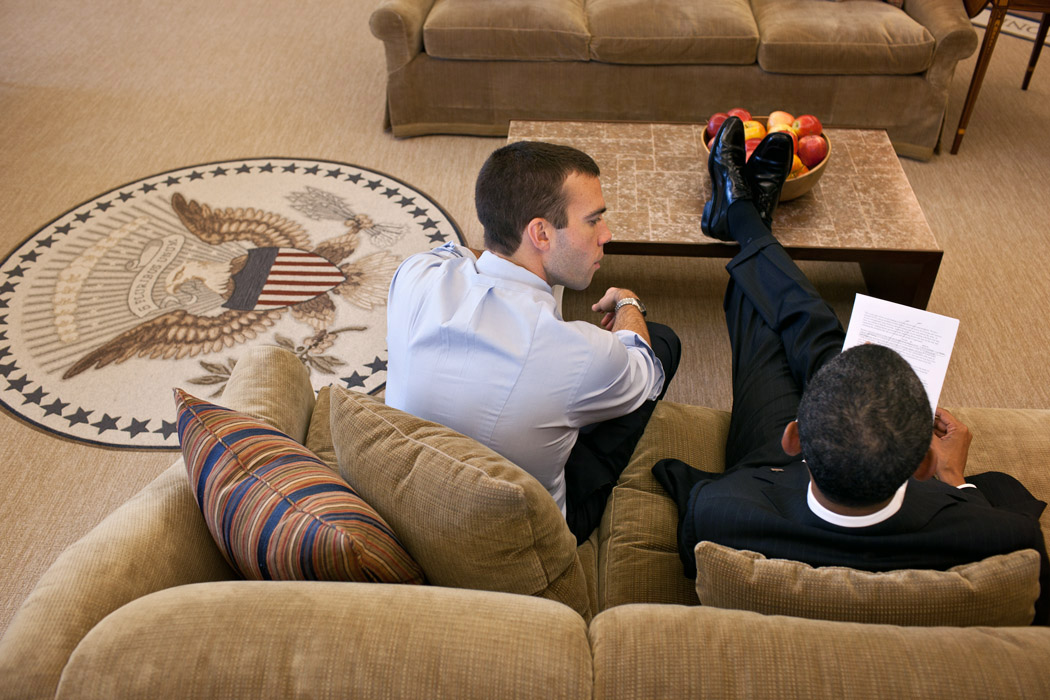
Speechwriter Jon Favreau and President Obama work on the 2011 address in the Oval Office the day before the session.

=== Revenue/savings ===
- A five-year freeze in domestic spending projected to save $400 billion over the next decade.
- Elimination of billions in tax breaks for oil companies. The president has previously sought to bring in more than $36 billion over the next decade through tax increases on oil and gas companies, but so far has been unable to win congressional support.
- Reductions in health care costs, including Medicare and Medicaid. Obama said he's willing to consider medical malpractice reform to "rein in frivolous lawsuits" and presumably drive down health care costs to the government in return. Though that proposal so far has not moved far beyond talking points, the Congressional Budget Office and Joint Committee on Taxation in 2009 estimated that tort reform could reduce federal government health care costs by $41 billion over 10 years.
- Reform for Social Security. Obama did not offer specifics.
- Ending the Bush-era tax cuts for the wealthiest 2 percent of Americans once the latest extension expires in two years. Before the rate was extended, the Obama administration estimated it would cost $700 billion over the next decade.
- A proposal to "merge, consolidate and reorganize the federal government." Obama said he will submit that proposal to Congress "in the coming months."
- A ban on congressional earmarks.
- A proposal to lower the corporate tax rate. Obama pitched this as part of a broader effort to simplify the tax code—he pledged the changes would not add to the deficit

=== Expenses ===
- Pledge to provide 80 percent of Americans with high-speed rail access in 25 years.
- Pledge to have 1 million electric vehicles on the road by 2015.
- Pledge to have 80 percent of the country's electricity come from clean-energy sources by 2035.
- New investment in biomedical research, information technology and clean-energy technology.
- A continuation of the $4.35 billion Race to the Top incentive program offering competitive federal grants to local school systems. Bruce Randolph School was mentioned as a success.
- A call to "redouble" efforts to repair America's aging roads and bridges.
- A call to make a $10,000 tuition tax credit permanent.

=== Other topics and goals ===
- A challenge to pursue innovation in "our generations' Sputnik moment."
- Replace No Child Left Behind with another form of education reform. A good amount of time was directed towards education during the address.
- The President announced that he will be taking a trip to Brazil, Chile and El Salvador in the spring, to sign trade deals, which will help create tens of thousands of new jobs.
- Remain committed to the War in Afghanistan, the war on terror, and on pressuring regimes like Iran, which is pursuing nuclear weapons, and North Korea, which has nuclear weapons.
- Continue alliance with the United Kingdom, Israel, and Japan.

== Response ==
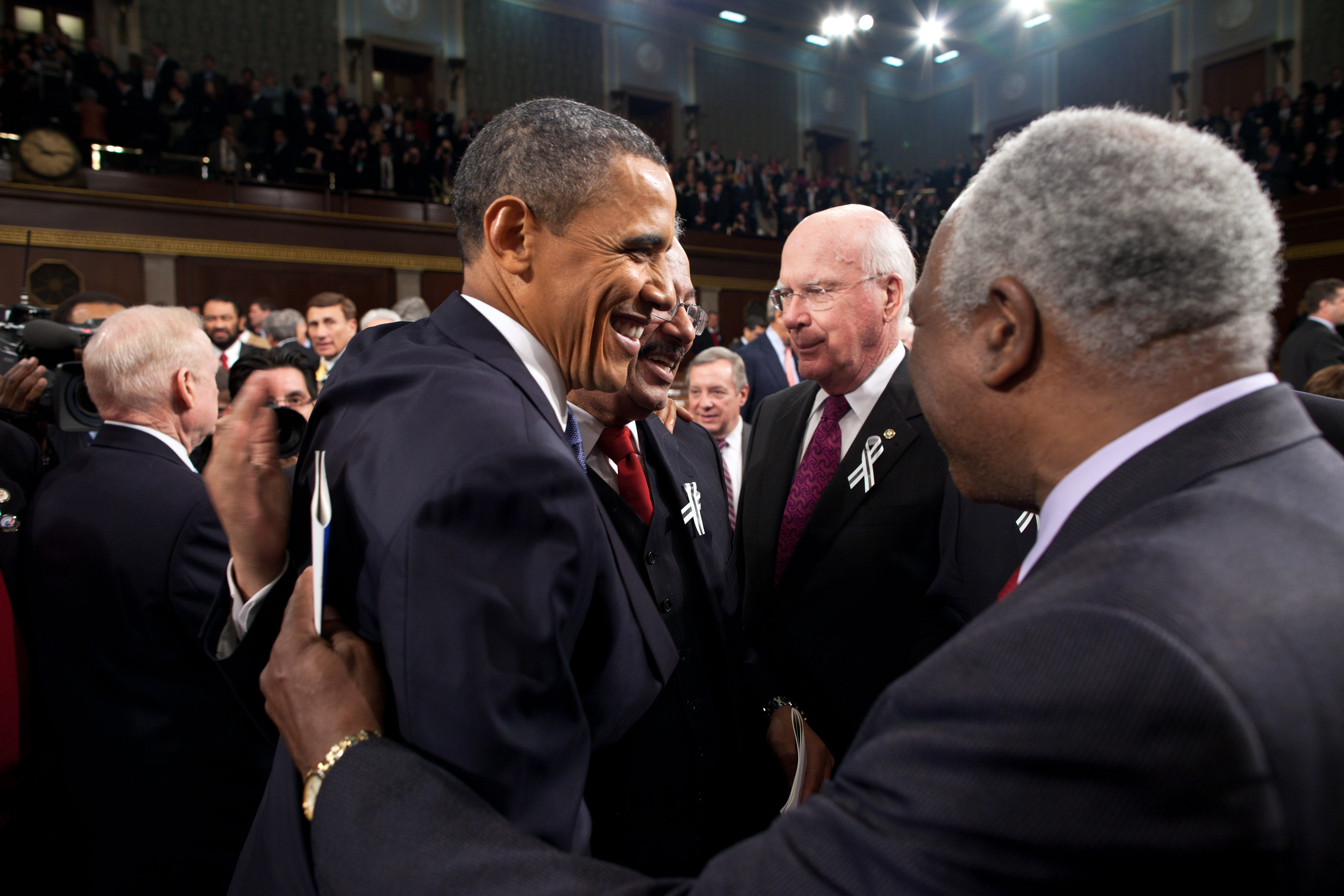
Obama greets members of Congress after the address.

Rep. Paul Ryan of Wisconsin, Chair of the House Budget Committee, gave the Republican response afterward. Rep. Ileana Ros-Lehtinen of Florida, Chair of the House Foreign Affairs Committee, gave a Spanish version of the response.

Rep. Michele Bachmann of Minnesota gave an address in response to Obama's speech on behalf of the Tea Party Express. Some Republicans opposed Bachmann's decision, worrying she would draw attention away from Ryan. Bachmann was refused access to the Capitol Hill Club to make her speech, forcing her to give the speech from the National Press Club.

Florida Republican Senator Marco Rubio gave a mixed review of Obama's speech, saying, "While I was encouraged by the President's support for an earmark ban and will work with him towards that goal, his call for a mere budget freeze does not go far enough in tackling our record debt. At the very least, we should freeze non-defense and non-veterans discretionary spending to what it was before Washington began its unprecedented, record-setting spending binge two years ago. But most importantly, we need to finally begin fundamentally reforming the way our government spends the American people's money." Democratic Senator Bill Nelson, also of Florida, praised Obama for "bringing us out of recession with jobs, helping small business, helping seniors with retirement security, getting government spending under control. Then he talked about civility. How do we treat each other? That's going to matter a lot." Florida Governor Rick Scott strongly criticized Obama's speech while New York Senators Chuck Schumer and Kirsten Gillibrand praised his economic agenda.

Leaders of several smaller political parties also gave prepared responses to the speech. The Libertarian Party's response was delivered by Executive Director Wes Benedict. Billy Wharton, co-chair of the Socialist Party USA, released a response through his party's website. Sam Webb, chairman of the Communist Party USA, released a response through the party's main website.

| Preceded by 2010 State of the Union Address | State of the Union addresses 2011 | Succeeded by 2012 State of the Union Address |
