= Foresite Capital =

American venture capital and growth equity firm

- Type: Private company
- Industry: Venture capital, growth equity
- Founded: 2011; 15 years ago
- Founder: Jim Tananbaum
- Headquarters: San Francisco, United States
- Area served: Worldwide
- Key people: Jim Tananbaum (CEO)
- Website: www.foresitecapital.com

Foresite Capital (Foresite) is an American, multi-stage healthcare and life sciences investment firm headquartered in Los Angeles, and with offices in The San Francisco Bay Area and New York City. As of June 2024, the company had raised six primary funds: Foresite Capital Fund I, II, III, IV, V and VI.

== History ==
Foresite Capital was founded in 2011 by Jim Tananbaum. Foresite Capital raised its $100 million Fund I in 2013. In 2014, Foresite Capital closed Foresite Capital Fund II, a $300 million fund. Foresite Capital Fund III, a $450 million fund, was closed in July 2015. Foresite Capital Fund IV, a $668 million fund, closed in March 2018. Foresite Capital Fund V, a $776 million fund and its associated opportunity fund closed in February 2021. Foresite Labs Fund I, a $173 million fund, closed in January 2022. Foresite Capital Fund VI, a $900 million fund, closed in May 2024.

== Investments ==
Foresite Capital funded 10x Genomics since its Series A round in November 2013 and led its Series B round in January 2015, as well as its Series C round in March 2016. Foresite Capital has invested in companies such as Acceleron Pharma, Aimmune, Alumis, ALX Oncology, Aerie Pharmaceuticals, Ascendis, Blueprint Medicines, CG Oncology, Color Genomics, Cue Health, Cytokinetics, DNAnexus, Editas Medicine, Eikon Therapeutics, Element Biosciences, Epizyme, Evonetix, Intarcia Therapeutics, Inscripta, Immunomedics, Intellia Therapeutics, Juno Therapeutics, Karyopharm, Keryx, Kura Oncology, Keros Therapeutics, Latigo, Maze Therapeutics, MyoKardia, MyOme, Natera, Nurix, Olema Oncology, Orexigen, Pacific Biosciences, Peloton Therapeutics, Pharvaris, MindStrong Health, Quantum-SI, Relay Therapeutics, Insitro, HealthVerity, Turning Point Therapeutics, Portola Pharmaceuticals, Universal American, Xaira Therapeutics, Xencor, RayThera, and WaveTech, in addition to 10x Genomics.

== Leadership ==
Foresite Capital is led by Midas List honoree Jim Tananbaum along with managing directors Stephen Peterson, Richard Lau, Dorothy Margolskee, Michael Rome, and Hadi Tabbaa.
