= 21st Century Cures Act =

Bill enacted by the 114th United States Congress

- Other short titles: Helping Families in Mental Health Crisis Reform Act of 2016; Increasing Choice, Access, and Quality in Health Care for Americans Act
- Long title: An Act to accelerate the discovery, development, and delivery of 21st century cures, and for other purposes.
- Enacted by: the 114th United States Congress

Citations
- Public law: Pub. L. 114–255 (text) (PDF)

Legislative history
- Introduced in the House as H.R. 34 by Suzanne Bonamici (D–OR–1) on January 6, 2015; Committee consideration by House Science, Space, and Technology and Senate Commerce, Science, and Transportation; Passed the House on January 7, 2015 (voice vote); Passed the Senate on October 6, 2016 (unanimous consent) with amendment; House agreed to Senate amendment on November 30, 2016 (392–26) with further amendment; Senate agreed to House amendment on December 7, 2016 (94–5); Signed into law by President Barack Obama on December 13, 2016

The 21st Century Cures Act is a United States law enacted by the 114th United States Congress in December 2016 and then signed into law on December 13, 2016. It authorized $6.3 billion in funding, mostly for the National Institutes of Health. The act was supported especially by large pharmaceutical manufacturers and was opposed especially by some consumer organizations.

The approval of drugs and devices would be streamlined, according to supporters, and treatments would reach the market more quickly. The argument made by opponents was that it would allow the marketing of riskier or less effective treatments by allowing the approval of drugs and devices on the basis of flimsier evidence, bypassing randomized, controlled trials.

The bill incorporated the Helping Families In Mental Health Crisis Act, first introduced by then-Congressman Tim Murphy, R-Pa., which increased the availability of psychiatric hospital beds and established a new assistant secretary for mental health and substance use disorders.

== Content ==
=== Research and drug development ===
Division A, titled "21st Century Cures," contains provisions related to National Institutes of Health funding and administration, reducing opioid abuse, medical research, and drug development.

==== Expanded access transparency ====
Section 3032 of the Act requires pharmaceutical manufacturers to make their policies regarding expanded access (compassionate use) publicly available. A 2021 analysis of this provision found that while large companies with FDA-approved products have largely complied, significantly fewer small and pre-approval companies have made these policies public as required.

==== Opioid epidemic ====
The Comprehensive Addiction and Recovery Act (CARA) was passed a few months earlier. This act authorized many harm-reduction strategies, including increased access to the overdose reversal drug naloxone for the opioid crisis, but didn't provide any federal funding for implementation. The 21st Century Cures Act designated $1 billion in grants for states over two years to fight the opioid epidemic. The money may be used to improve prescription drug monitoring programs, to make treatment programs more accessible, to train healthcare professionals in best practices of addiction treatment, and to research the most effective approaches to prevent dependency.

==== FDA drug approval process ====
The 21st Century Cures Act modified the FDA Drug Approval process. It was intended to expedite the process by which new drugs and devices are approved by easing the requirements put on drug companies looking for FDA approval on new products or new indications on existing drugs. For instance, under certain conditions, the act allows companies to provide "data summaries" and "real world evidence" such as observational studies, insurance claims data, patient input, and anecdotal data rather than full clinical trial results.

==== Targeted drugs for rare diseases ====
The 21st Century Cures Act facilitates the development and approval of genetically targeted and variant protein targeted drugs for treatment of rare diseases.

==== Informed consent ====
In section 3024, the 21st Century Cures Act allows researchers to waive the requirement for "informed consent" in cases where clinical testing of drugs or devices "poses no more than minimal risk" and "includes appropriate safeguards to protect the rights, safety, and welfare of the human subject."

One example is a high-tech bandage that monitors blood flow. Standard procedure requires researchers to obtain the patient's permission before testing any new device on them. However, in this example, researchers might want to test the bandage on unconscious patients. In such circumstances, researchers may waive an informed consent requirement since the patient is still getting the standard, medically accepted care of blood pressure and heart rate monitoring. Researchers would still need to obey standard research protocols including institutional review boards to approve their research design and ethics.

==== Human research subject protections ====
The 21st Century Cures Act calls on the Secretary of Health and Human Services to harmonize differences between the HHS Human Subject Regulations and FDA Human Subject Regulations. In so doing, the Secretary may change rules applying to vulnerable populations in order "to reduce regulatory duplication and unnecessary delays" and "modernize such provisions in the context of multisite and cooperative research projects."

Section 3023 provides for joint or shared review of research, review by institutional review boards other than that of the sponsor of research, and use of other means "to avoid duplication of effort."

==== Medical research ====
The act allocates $4.8 billion to the National Institutes of Health for precision medicine and biomedical research. Of this, $1.5 billion is earmarked for research on brain disease. In October 2016, the Cohort Program was renamed as the All of Us Research Program.

Another $1.8 billion is dedicated to cancer research in what is called the "Beau Biden Cancer Moonshot" initiative, named in honor of Vice President Joe Biden's son Beau Biden, who died of brain cancer in 2015. The initiative aimed to reduce cancer death rates by half.

When Joe Biden became president, his administration revamped the cancer initiative. On the 60th anniversary of the John F. Kennedy moonshot speech, President Biden gave a speech at the JFK library, promoting the revival of the Beau Biden Cancer Moonshot, including the new Advanced Research Projects Agency for Health.

In May 2024, Congress voted against renewing funding to the program. The 2024 budget passed by Congress was tight, due to Republican control of the house, deficit concerns, and Republican desire to deny Biden a win soon before the election. The White House said it was "well prepared to take forward the cancer moonshot in a tough funding cycle;" mandatory moonshot funding was included in Biden's fiscal year 2025 budget request.

=== Healthcare ===
==== Electronic health records information blocking ====
The Act defined interoperability and prohibited information blocking. Information blocking is defined as a practice that interferes with or prevents access to electronic health information, that is, information about a patient's medical history or treatment.

Under section 4004, information blocking can expose entities to fines of up to $1 million per violation.

==== Medical software ====
Medical software is regulated as a medical device by the FDA in the Federal Food, Drug, and Cosmetic Act. Section 3060 of the 21st Century Cures Act was created as an amendment to section 520 of the FD&C Act, which addressed how medical devices are defined. It outlined software functions that would be exempt from FDA regulation, such as those used for administrative purposes, encouraging a healthy lifestyle, electronic health records, clinical laboratory test results and related information, and clinical decision tools.

==== Healthcare access and quality improvement ====
Division C, titled "Increasing Choice, Access, and Quality in Health Care for Americans," concerns Medicare programs and federal tax laws related to health plans for small employers.

===== The Small Business HRA (QSEHRA) =====
The 21st Century Cures Act also included provisions that created a QSEHRA (Qualified Small Employer Health Reimbursement Arrangement), a more efficient way for small businesses and non-profits to offer health insurance to their employees.

=== Behavioral health ===
Division B, titled "Helping Families in Mental Health Crisis," addresses the prevention and treatment of mental illnesses and substance abuse, treatment coverage, communication permitted by HIPAA, and interactions with law enforcement and the criminal justice system.

The law strengthens mental health parity regulation, which require insurance companies to cover mental health treatments to the same extent and in the same way as medical treatments. It also includes grants to provide community mental health resources, suicide prevention and intervention programs, and de-escalation training for law enforcement. It also provides five-year grants for a demonstration program in which psychiatry residents and other mental health clinicians will practice in underserved areas. Provisions for reform of HIPAA, elevating the standing of families in commitment decisions, and reforms of procedures for challenging release decisions, were not included in the final bill.

Some of these provisions were originally proposed in earlier bills, including the Mental Health Reform Act of 2016 (S. 2680); the Mental Health and Safe Communities Act of 2015 (H.R. 3722, S. 2002); the Helping Families in Mental Health Crisis Act of 2016 (H.R. 2646); the Comprehensive Justice and Mental Health Act of 2015 (H.R. 1854, S. 993); the Mental Health Awareness and Improvement Act of 2015 (H.R. 5327, S. 1893); the Justice and Mental Health Collaboration Act of 2015 (H.R. 731); and the Behavioral Health Care Integration Act of 2016 (H.R. 4388).

=== Strategic Petroleum Reserve sales ===
The act requires sale of 25 million barrels of crude oil (10,000,000 in 2017, 9,000,000 in 2018, and 6,000,000 in 2019) from the Strategic Petroleum Reserve. Revenue from these sales will provide part of the NIH funding provided in the law.

== Legislative history ==
The 21st Century Cures Act was originally introduced as H.R. 6 by Fred Upton (R–MI) on May 19, 2015. It passed the House on July 10, 2015, but did not pass in the Senate.

More than 1,400 registered lobbyists worked on this bill, representing more than 400 different organizations, mostly pharmaceutical companies.

Of 455 organizations registered to lobby on the bill, the top five by number of reports and specific issues according to OpenSecrets were:

- Roche Holdings (61)
- Blue Cross Blue Shield (49)
- Pharmaceutical Research and Manufacturers of America PhRMA (49)
- Amgen (41)
- American Hospital Association (36).

The bill passed the House first by a wide margin. Only five senators voted against it: Elizabeth Warren of Massachusetts; Bernie Sanders of Vermont; Ron Wyden and Jeff Merkley, both of Oregon, all Democrats; and Mike Lee, a Republican of Utah. Warren, Sanders, and Merkley, in particular, objected to the pharmaceutical industry's influence on the bill. In final version was passed with bipartisan support.

President Obama signed the act on December 13, 2016. The reasons stated for his support included combatting opioid abuse, advancing cancer research, advancing the BRAIN Initiative, advancing the Precision Medicine Initiative, and addressing bipartisan health issues.

== Reception ==
Stakeholders who praised the passing of the act include drug companies; medical device manufacturers; the National Institutes of Health; people advocating for lowered barriers to collecting human subject research data; Representatives Fred Upton (R-MI), Diana DeGette (D-CO), Timothy F. Murphy (R-PA); Senator Lamar Alexander (R-TN); and Vice President Joe Biden. Hospitals and universities, as well as the American Cancer Society Action Network, Research!America, and FasterCures supported the bill for its commitment toward funding research. The American Psychological Association supported the bill due to its mental health provisions. The Advanced Medical Technology Association supported the bill for easing the process of introducing new medical technologies. The American Society of Human Genetics (ASHG) commended the passage of the bill for strengthened genetic privacy for research participants. Prison Fellowship supported the bill due to its inclusion of the Comprehensive Justice and Mental Health Act, a portion designed to encourage collaboration among criminal justice, juvenile justice, mental health treatment, and substance abuse systems.

Stakeholders who criticized the passing of the act include the FDA, advocates for strong protections in clinical research, consumer organizations, and advocates of regenerative medicine. The expedited drug approval process has been one topic of concern and debate. The Public Citizen's Health Research Group and the National Center for Health Research campaigned against the Cures Act in fear that it will endanger public health by weakening FDA standards. Senator Elizabeth Warren said that the bill had been "hijacked" by the pharmaceutical industry. She said the legislation watered down safety requirements for new drugs and devices and then, as a trade-off, called for research funding — at levels that must be appropriated on an annual basis. John LaMattina, former head of Pfizer research and development and current commentator on the pharmaceutical industry, said that full clinical trials are necessary to prove effectiveness, and suggests some drugs may now be approved based on early data and only later proved ineffective. The Public Citizen's Health Research Group says the designation of "breakthrough" devices is too broad, and could lead to clearance of devices that aren't ready for the market.

Lupkin points out that the NIH's funding will need to be appropriated each year through the normal budget process, and therefore may be reduced from what this bill promised. The NIH funding was actually less than many advocates hoped for, and earlier versions of the bill had promised.

One of the goals of the bill was streamlining approval, but Jerry Avorn and Aaron Kesselheim pointed out that a third of medicines are approved from a single clinical trial averaging fewer than 700 patients; ultimately, however, the law did not allow real-world evidence for approving drugs, but rather for label expansions.

== See also ==
- BRAIN Initiative
- Cancer Moonshot 2020
- Precision Medicine Initiative
