= 2015 State of the Union Address =

Speech by US President Barack Obama

- Full video of the speech as published by the White House
- Date: January 20, 2015
- Time: 9:00 p.m. EST
- Duration: 59 minutes
- Venue: House Chamber, United States Capitol
- Location: Washington, D.C.; 38°53′19.8″N 77°00′32.8″W
- Type: State of the Union Address
- Participants: Barack Obama; Joe Biden; John Boehner
- Footage: C-SPAN
- Previous: 2014 State of the Union Address
- Next: 2016 State of the Union Address
- Website: Full text by Archives.gov

The 2015 State of the Union Address was given by the 44th president of the United States, Barack Obama, on January 20, 2015, at 9:00 p.m. EST, in the chamber of the United States House of Representatives to the 114th United States Congress. It was Obama's sixth State of the Union Address and his seventh speech to a joint session of the United States Congress. Presiding over this joint session was the House speaker, John Boehner, accompanied by Joe Biden, the vice president, in his capacity as the president of the Senate.

Following recent tradition, Speaker of the House John Boehner sent a letter on December 19, 2014, formally inviting President Obama to speak (despite a proposal from some conservatives that House Republicans withhold the invitation in retaliation for Obama's executive actions on immigration reform). The State of the Union Address was broadcast on various television and radio stations and webcast from the White House. Webcasts were also provided by other sponsors, including a webcast from the U.S. Republican Party.

The President addressed controversial economic issues in the U.S., arguing in support of expanding access to community college in the context of American higher education as well as in support of increased taxes on financial institutions. In terms of U.S. foreign policy, he expressed his belief in American exceptionalism and defended what he saw as an assertive foreign agenda in which the country is "upholding the principle that bigger nations can't bully the small."

== Seating and guests ==
As since 2011, members of Congress sat together, regardless of party. Guests of First Lady Michelle Obama at the Address included the former prisoner of Cuba Alan Gross, astronaut Scott Kelly, DREAM Act immigration reform activist Ana Zamora, Ebola international emergency care coordinator Dr. Pranav Shetty, the CEO of CVS Health (which had recently become the first major retail pharmacy to stop selling tobacco products) Larry Merlo, working mother and community college education beneficiary Rebekah Erler, healthcare insurance acquisition worker Victor Fugate, wounded veteran Staff Sergeant Jason Gibson, sea-level rise researcher Nicole Hernandez Hammer, university student Anthony Mendez, technical education teacher Katrice Mubiru, healthcare coverage beneficiary and mother Astrid Muhammad, Spencer Stone, U.S. Air Force staff sergeant, and others (26 designated guests altogether).

Supreme Court Justice Ruth Bader Ginsburg was "repeatedly pictured slumbering in her chair" during the address. Ginsburg admitted that she "wasn't 100% sober".

== Designated survivor ==
The designated survivor is the member of the president's cabinet who does not attend the address in case of a catastrophic event, in order to maintain continuity of government. Secretary of Transportation Anthony Foxx was the designated survivor.

== Address contents and delivery ==
In general terms, President Obama referenced the country's many struggles over the past fifteen years and argued that the nation seemed primed to "turn the page". The address focused on the improved American economic situation and the fight against terrorism, especially the threat of the Islamic State of Iraq and the Levant. Obama called for community college to be made free, proposed a new tax on Wall Street companies, and announced that he would issue an executive order to guarantee workers up to seven days of paid sick leave. The President described the nation's drive as "strong" and stated, "Tonight, after a breakthrough year for America, our economy is growing and creating jobs at the fastest pace since 1999. Our unemployment rate is now lower than it was before the financial crisis."

In keeping with prior statements by the Obama administration on foreign policy, the President also remarked that the U.S. had good reason to stand up to what it saw as Russian belligerence towards Ukraine. The President specifically called for "upholding the principle that bigger nations can't bully the small." He also reiterated his belief in the idea of American exceptionalism.

In a memorable moment, President Obama deviated from the official text after applause from Republicans following his statement that he had "no more campaigns to run." Obama then added "I know because I won both of them."

With the speech delivered less than two weeks following the Charlie Hebdo shooting, many members of Congress held pencils during the speech to show their support for freedom of the press as well as to express their sympathy with the victims of the attack.

Obama became the first president to use the words "lesbian", "gay", "bisexual", and "transgender" in a State of the Union Address, when addressing the need to protect the human rights of religious, sexual and gender minorities.

== Reactions ==
=== United States ===
Newly elected U. S. Senator Joni Ernst of Iowa gave the official Republican response in English to the State of the Union address, with Representative Carlos Curbelo of Florida giving the official Republican Spanish-language response. The English and Spanish responses differed in that the Spanish response talked about immigration issues, whereas the English response did not. In addition to the official Republican responses, Representative Curt Clawson of Florida, Senator Ted Cruz of Texas, and Senator Rand Paul of Kentucky all gave their own televised responses.

Obama's televised address was viewed by 33 million Americans, making it the lowest number in recent history.

=== International ===
Russian Foreign Minister Sergei Lavrov said that Obama's speech indicated plans for world domination and displayed goading behavior. "The Americans have chosen a path toward confrontation, and do not evaluate their own steps critically at all", Lavrov added.

Preceded by 2014 State of the Union Address	State of the Union addresses 2015	Succeeded by 2016 State of the Union Address
