= Natera =

American clinical genetic testing company

Natera, Inc.
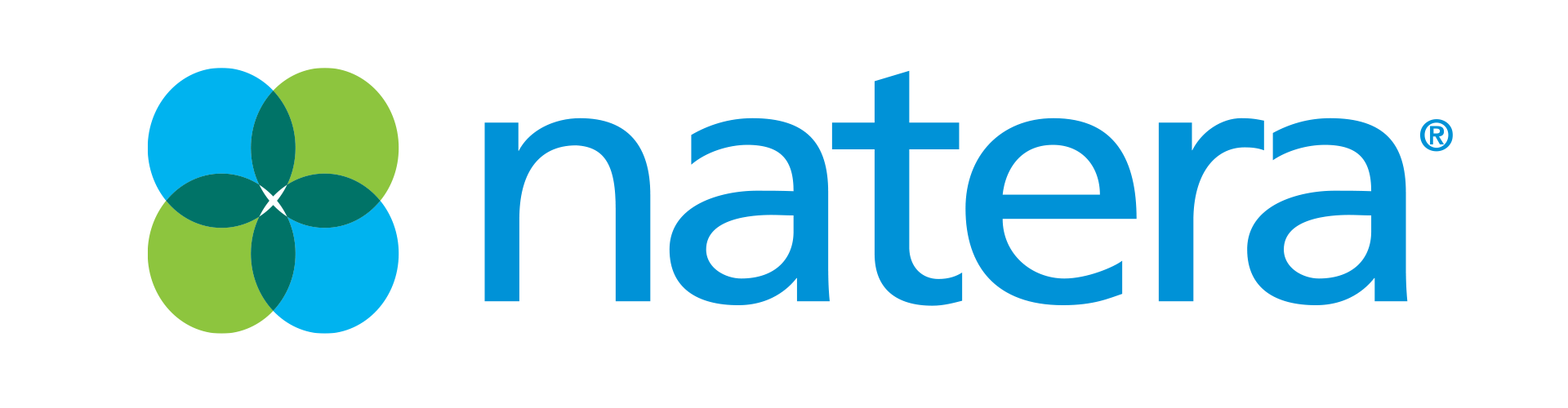
- Formerly: Gene Security Network, Inc. (2004–2012)
- Company type: Public
- Traded as: Nasdaq: NTRA; Russell 1000 component
- Industry: Genetic testing
- Founded: 2004; 22 years ago
- Founders: Matthew Rabinowitz; Jonathan Sheena
- Headquarters: Austin, Texas, U.S.
- Key people: Steve Chapman (CEO); Rishi Kacker (CTO); Matthew Rabinowitz (executive chairman)
- Revenue: ▲US$797 million (2022)
- Operating income: ▼US$−541 million (2022)
- Net income: ▼US$−548 million (2022)
- Total assets: ▲US$1.39 billion (2022)
- Total equity: ▲US$706 million (2022)
- Number of employees: 3,018 (2022)
- Website: natera.com

Natera, Inc. is a clinical genetic testing company based in Austin, Texas that specializes in non-invasive, cell-free DNA (cfDNA) testing technology, with a focus on women's health, cancer, and organ health. Natera's proprietary technology combines novel molecular biology techniques with a suite of bioinformatics software that allows detection down to a single molecule in a tube of blood. Natera operates CAP-accredited laboratories certified under the Clinical Laboratory Improvement Amendments (CLIA) in San Carlos, California and Austin, Texas.

== History ==
Natera (previously Gene Security Network) was founded by Matthew Rabinowitz and Jonathan Sheena in 2004. Natera launched its first product, the Spectrum preimplantation genetic test, in 2009.

In 2010, the company introduced the Anora miscarriage (POC) test. Natera's advanced carrier screening test, Horizon, launched in 2012. The following year, 2013, Natera launched the Panorama non-invasive prenatal test (NIPT).

In July 2015, Natera conducted an initial public offering of common stock at a price of $18.00 per share. The shares trade on the Nasdaq Global Select Market under the symbol "NTRA."

In 2017, Natera launched the Vistara single-gene NIPT. That same year, Natera introduced the Signatera molecular residual disease (MRD) test for research use only. The Signatera CLIA test was introduced for clinical use in 2019.

In 2018 Natera paid a $11 million fine to the department over allegations of improper billing and sales of Panorama to federal Healthcare services between the years of 2013 to 2016.

Natera launched the Prospera dd-cfDNA transplant assessment test in 2019, and the Renasight kidney gene panel and the Empower hereditary cancer test in 2020.

As of May 2021, Natera has performed over 3 million cell-free DNA tests. Natera's technology has also been written about in over 200 peer-reviewed journals and publications, including Nature, Science Magazine, and the Journal of Clinical Oncology.

== Products and services ==
=== Women's health ===
The Panorama NIPT is the only single-nucleotide polymorphism (SNP)-based NIPT. The test analyzes fetal DNA found in the mother's blood to reveal a baby's risk for genetic disorders such as Down syndrome (trisomy 21) and Edwards syndrome (trisomy 18) as early as nine weeks. Panorama also tests for unique microdeletions and is the only test that can detect zygosity and fetal sex in twins.

Natera also offers Horizon, a carrier-screening test that uses next-generation sequencing to provide carrier status for up to 274 genetic conditions. Additionally, Natera offers the Anora products of conception (POC) miscarriage test, the Spectrum preimplantation genetic screening and diagnosis test, and the Vistara single-gene prenatal screening test. In 2020, Natera launched Empower, a hereditary cancer test that screens for up to 53 genes associated with increased risk for common hereditary cancers.

=== Oncology ===
Signatera is the first circulating tumor DNA (ctDNA) assay built for molecular residual disease (MRD) detection and cancer recurrence monitoring. In 2020, Signatera received the CE Mark, as well as final Medicare coverage in stage II-III colorectal cancer and draft coverage in immunotherapy response monitoring. Signatera has been clinically validated to detect colorectal cancer recurrence up to 16.5 months in advance of radiologic imaging and early-stage breast cancer up to two years earlier than imaging.

=== Organ health ===
The Prospera test is the first assay with high sensitivity to both T-cell-mediated and antibody-mediated rejection. In December 2019, the test received final Medicare coverage. In 2020, Natera launched Renasight, a test to determine if there is a genetic cause for an individual's kidney disease and if there may be other at-risk relatives.

=== Constellation ===
Natera offers a cloud-based bioinformatics platform called Constellation, allowing laboratories to access and use Natera's technology in their own facilities. Constellation is currently only available outside of the United States.
