= Baseline Study =

Project Baseline is a broad effort to map human health led by Verily Life Sciences (formerly Google Life Sciences), Alphabet, Inc.'s health sciences division, and was announced in the Wall Street Journal on July 24, 2014. It began with the Project Baseline Study, which aimed to collect phenotypic health data from approximately 10,000 participants over the course of at least four years. The project employs experts from widely varying fields including science, medicine, user experience and design, engineering and patient advocacy. The project is not the first one to aim to collect data on many individuals for medical purposes, but it aimed to collect a much larger amount of data covering a broader array of topics than its predecessors. De-identified Project Baseline study data is available to qualified researchers for exploratory analysis in the future. Qualified external researchers may apply through applications reviewed by the Proposal Review and Publications Committee and Scientific Executive Committee.

== Purpose ==
The Project Baseline study is the first initiative of Project Baseline, a broader effort designed to develop a well-defined reference, or "baseline," of good health as well as a rich data platform that may be used to better understand the transition from health to disease and identify additional risk factors for disease. The study collected comprehensive health information both within and outside the four walls of a clinic. Within the clinic, a broad group of participants - including those who are exceptionally healthy, at-risk of disease, and with overt disease - provided deep data on a diverse set of measurements with repeat sampling over the course of four years. To bridge these encounters, Verily has developed tools such as the investigational Study Watch to allow participants to provide insights throughout their everyday lives.

That means the Project Baseline study dataset includes clinical, molecular, imaging, self-reported, behavioral, environmental, sensor and other health-related measurements. To organize this information, Verily developed infrastructure that can process multi-dimensional health data - much of which have never been combined for an individual.

The project also hoped to enable doctors to predict the onset of diseases such as cancer and heart disease far earlier than is currently possible. Organizers hoped this would move medicine toward an era centered on prevention rather than treatment. In addition, the study aimed to identify biomarkers that make certain people more or less susceptible to various diseases.

== Methodology ==
The project began in the summer of 2014, when Google began recruiting volunteers to collect bodily fluids such as urine, blood, saliva and tears for a pilot study. The public facing launch was in April 2017, and since then participants have begun enrolling. Sites include Duke University School of Medicine and Stanford Medicine, whose institutional review boards will also monitor the study and make sure the data from it is not misused, according to Verily. Verily also stated that all the data in the study would be anonymized before researchers would have access to it.

== Ethical concerns ==
Specialist online reporting service STAT News reported in 2016 that the contract for testing of the 200 patients for the study's pilot phase had been awarded without competitive bidding to the California Health & Longevity Institute, a luxury health clinic largely owned by Verily Executive Chairman and Founder Andrew Conrad that offers medical and cosmetic para-medical services and alternative medicine in a spa-like setting. The report said that Conrad had stated that the clinic had the advantage of having all the testing equipment needed for the study in one location, but neither he nor officials from the clinic would disclose what relevant experience the clinic had in conducting the complex research required for the project. Conrad further stated that the contract had been vetted by Google X's compliance and ethics officers when Verily was still part of that division, and a spokesperson stated that Conrad had recused himself from the decision-making project, but a former Verily employee claimed that Google X's vetting of the deal was perfunctory.

In April 2017, a Verily spokeswoman confirmed that Andy Conrad had divested from the California Health & Longevity Institute.

== See also ==
- Precision Medicine Initiative
- All of Us (initiative)
