= List of topics related to Barack Obama =

This page is an index of Wikipedia articles related to Barack Obama, the 44th President of the United States, who served from 2009 to 2017. It covers topics including his presidency, presidential campaigns, career in the Illinois Senate and United States Senate, family members, and books written by and about him.

== Presidency ==
- Timeline of the presidency of Barack Obama (2009)
- Timeline of the presidency of Barack Obama (2010)
- Timeline of the presidency of Barack Obama (2011)
- Timeline of the presidency of Barack Obama (2012)
- Timeline of the presidency of Barack Obama (2013)
- Timeline of the presidency of Barack Obama (2014)
- Timeline of the presidency of Barack Obama (2015)
- Timeline of the presidency of Barack Obama (2016)
- Timeline of the presidency of Barack Obama (2017)
- First 100 days of Barack Obama's presidency
- Foreign policy of the Barack Obama administration
- Political positions of Barack Obama
- Public image of Barack Obama
- List of federal judges appointed by Barack Obama
- Presidential transition of Barack Obama
- Confirmations of Barack Obama's Cabinet
- Barack Obama Supreme Court candidates
- Barack Obama speech to joint session of Congress, 2009
- First inauguration of Barack Obama
- Second inauguration of Barack Obama
- List of unofficial events for the inauguration of Barack Obama
- We Are One: The Obama Inaugural Celebration at the Lincoln Memorial

== 2008 campaign ==
- 2008 United States presidential election
- 2008 United States presidential election timeline
- List of Barack Obama presidential campaign endorsements, 2008
- Barack Obama presidential primary campaign, 2008
- Barack Obama election victory speech 2008
- Jeremiah Wright controversy
- Bill Ayers presidential election controversy
- Oprah Winfrey's endorsement of Barack Obama
- Republican and conservative support for Barack Obama in 2008
- Newspaper endorsements in the United States presidential election, 2008, for Barack Obama
- Invitations to the inauguration of Barack Obama
- 2008 Democratic National Convention
- A More Perfect Union (speech) Obama's campaign speech on race
- List of Barack Obama presidential campaign staff members, 2008
- List of Barack Obama presidential campaign endorsements from state, local and territory officials
- Results of the 2008 Democratic Party presidential primaries
- Nationwide opinion polling for the United States presidential election, 2008
- Comparison of United States presidential candidates, 2008
- Congressional endorsements for the 2008 United States presidential election
- Nationwide opinion polling for the Democratic Party 2008 presidential candidates
- South Carolina Democratic primary, 2008
- United States presidential election in Iowa, 2008

== Career ==
- Electoral history of Barack Obama
- Early life and career of Barack Obama
- United States Senate career of Barack Obama
- Illinois Senate career of Barack Obama
- Illinois Senate elections of Barack Obama
- List of bills sponsored by Barack Obama in the United States Senate
- 2004 Democratic National Convention keynote address
- United States Senate election in Illinois, 2004
- Illinois's 1st congressional district election, 2000

== Family members ==
=== Immediate family ===
- Michelle Obama Obama's wife
- Marian Shields Robinson Michelle Obama's mother
- Bo (dog) First Family's pet

=== Extended family ===
- Ann Dunham Obama's mother
- Barack Obama, Sr. Obama's father
- Lolo Soetoro Indonesian stepfather
- Madelyn Dunham Maternal grandmother
- Maya Soetoro-Ng Obama's half-sister
- Stanley Armour Dunham Obama's maternal grandfather
- Zeituni Onyango Obama's half aunt
- Charles T. Payne Obama's great uncle who served in World War II

=== Michelle Obama's extended family ===
- Craig Robinson Michelle Obama's older brother
- Capers C. Funnye Jr. Michelle Obama's first cousin once removed

== Books ==
=== By Barack Obama ===
- The Audacity of Hope
- Dreams from My Father

=== About Barack Obama ===
- The Speech: Race and Barack Obama's "A More Perfect Union" - collection of writings regarding Obama's speech "A More Perfect Union"
- Barack Obama - Der schwarze Kennedy ("Barack Obama - The Black Kennedy") - German biography in support of Obama's presidential run
- The Obama Nation - controversial book arguing against Obama's presidential run
- The Case Against Barack Obama - book arguing against Obama's presidential run, focusing on his policies
- A Bound Man: Why We Are Excited About Obama and Why He Can't Win - a 2007 book by Shelby Steele which focuses on Obama's ethnic identity

== Named after Barack Obama ==
- List of things named after Barack Obama

Illinois Senate
Preceded by Alice Palmer	Member of the Illinois Senate from the 13th district 1997–2004	Succeeded by Kwame Raoul
Party political offices
Preceded by Carol Moseley Braun	Democratic nominee for U.S. Senator from Illinois (Class 3); 2004	Succeeded by Alexi Giannoulias
Preceded by Harold Ford Jr.	Keynote Speaker of the Democratic National Convention; 2004	Succeeded by Mark Warner
Preceded by John Kerry	Democratic nominee for President of the United States; 2008, 2012	Succeeded by Hillary Clinton
U.S. Senate
Preceded by Peter Fitzgerald	United States Senator (Class 3) from Illinois; 2005–2008; Served alongside: Dick Durbin	Succeeded by Roland Burris
Political offices
Preceded by George W. Bush	President of the United States; 2009–2017	Succeeded by Donald Trump
Awards and achievements
Preceded by Martti Ahtisaari	Nobel Peace Prize Laureate; 2009	Succeeded by Liu Xiaobo
U.S. order of precedence (ceremonial)
Preceded by George W. Bush as former president	Order of precedence of the United States former president	Succeeded by Donald Trump as former president
Diplomatic posts
Preceded by Gordon Brown	Chairperson of the Group of 20; 2009	Succeeded by Stephen Harper
