= Timeline of the Barack Obama presidency =

Barack Obama, a Democrat from Illinois, was elected president of the United States on November 4, 2008 and was inaugurated as the nation's 44th president on January 20, 2009. He was re-elected on November 6, 2012; his second inauguration was on January 20, 2013, and his presidency ended on January 20, 2017, with the first inauguration of Donald Trump. The following articles cover the timeline of Obama's presidency, and the time leading up to it:

- Pre-presidency: 2007–2009
  - Barack Obama 2008 presidential campaign
  - Presidential transition of Barack Obama
- Presidency: 2009–2017
  - First 100 days of the Obama presidency
  - Timeline of the Barack Obama presidency (2009)
  - Timeline of the Barack Obama presidency (2010)
  - Timeline of the Barack Obama presidency (2011)
  - Timeline of the Barack Obama presidency (2012)
  - Timeline of the Barack Obama presidency (2013)
  - Timeline of the Barack Obama presidency (2014)
  - Timeline of the Barack Obama presidency (2015)
  - Timeline of the Barack Obama presidency (2016–2017)

== See also ==
- Timeline of the George W. Bush presidency, for his predecessor
- Timeline of the Donald Trump presidencies, for his successor
