= Timeline of the Barack Obama presidency (2011) =

The following is a timeline of the presidency of Barack Obama, from January 1, 2011, to December 31, 2011. For his time as president-elect, see the presidential transition of Barack Obama; for a detailed account of his first months in office, see first 100 days of Barack Obama's presidency; for a complete itinerary of his travels, see list of presidential trips made by Barack Obama.

== January ==
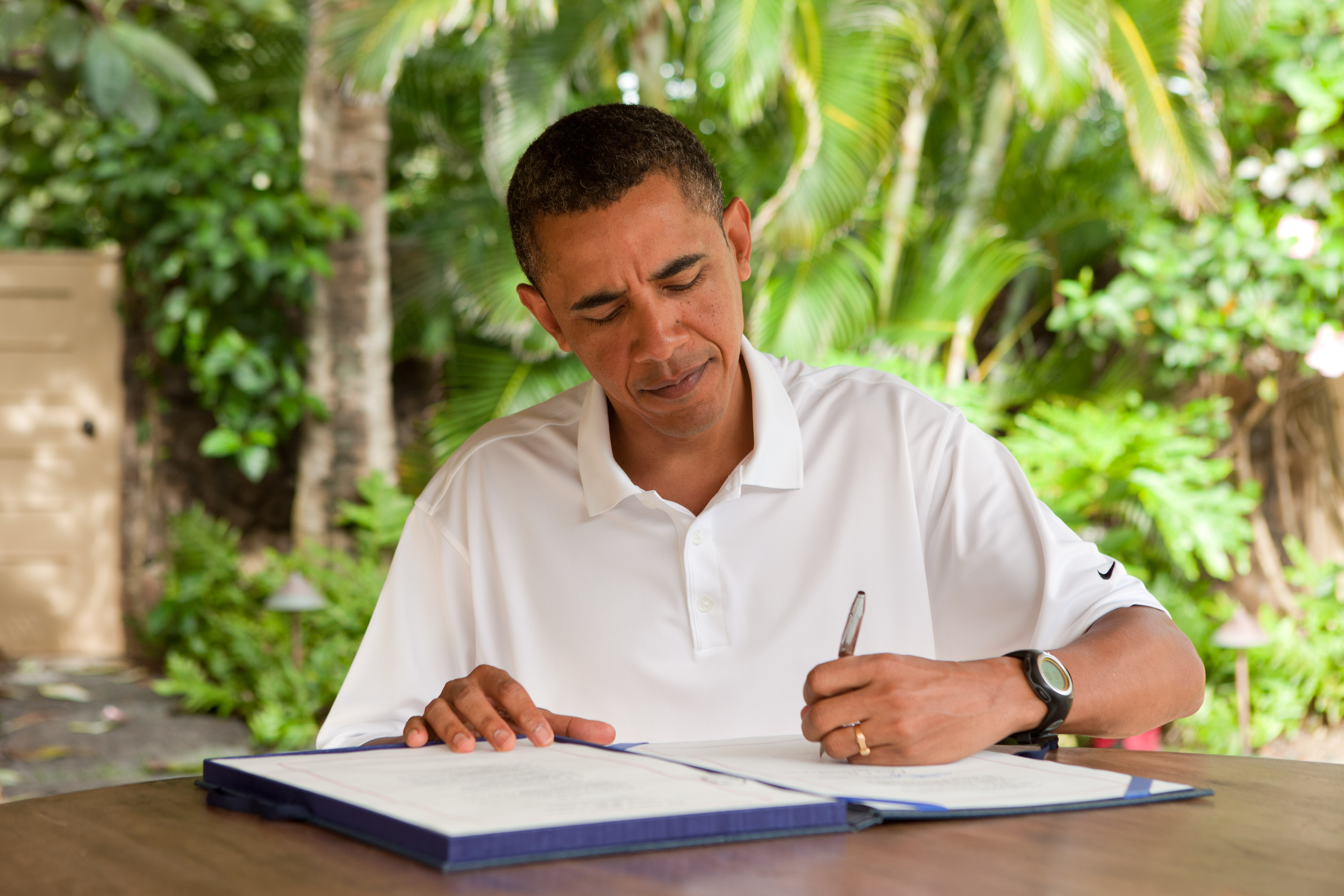
January 2: President Obama signing the James Zadroga 9/11 Health and Compensation Act of 2010 into law at Plantation Estate.

- January 2 – President Obama signs the James Zadroga 9/11 Health and Compensation Act of 2010, H.R. 847, into law at his vacation rental house, Plantation Estate, in Hawaii.
- January 3 – The 112th United States Congress convenes. The Republican Party is controlling the House of Representatives while the Democratic Party is retaining their majority in the Senate.
- January 3 – John Boehner is elected as Speaker of the United States House of Representatives.
- January 4 – President Obama signs 35 acts into law including the Government Performance and Results Modernization Act of 2010 and the FDA Food Safety Modernization Act.
- January 10 – President Obama leads a national moment of silence for the victims of the 2011 Tucson shooting. French President Nicolas Sarkozy meets with President Obama at the White House in anticipation of France's hosting of the G8 and G20 summits.
- January 12 – President Obama has a morning meeting with Prime Minister Saad Hariri of Lebanon. Afterward, the President and First Lady Michelle Obama travel to Tucson, Arizona, where they visit Representative Gabby Giffords and other survivors of the recent shooting; later, the President delivers remarks at a memorial service for the six victims of the shooting.
- January 19 – President and Mrs. Obama welcome Chinese President Hu Jintao to the White House for a state visit.
- January 21 – President Obama announces that Paul Volcker will be stepping down as an adviser to the Economic Recovery Advisory Board.

State of the Union address (January 25, 2011) (1:07:31)
Barack Obama's January 25, 2011 State of the Union Address

State of the Union address (January 25, 2011) (audio)
Audio-only version

- January 25 – President Obama delivers his annual State of the Union Address before a joint session of Congress.

== February ==
- February 1 – President Obama delivers remarks on the protests in Egypt.
- February 2 – President Obama signs the instrument of ratification for New START, a nuclear arms reduction treaty between the United States and the Russian Federation.
- February 3 – President Obama speaks at the National Prayer Breakfast. The President visits Penn State University to promote his "Better Buildings" energy conservation initiative.
- February 7 – The President speaks at a meeting of the United States Chamber of Commerce at the organization's headquarters near the White House.
- February 10 – President Obama travels to Northern Michigan University to promote the school's WiMAX system.
- February 11 – President Obama speaks about the revolution in Egypt following the resignation of Egyptian President Hosni Mubarak. Jay Carney replaces Robert Gibbs as White House Press Secretary.
- February 14 – The President unveils his spending request for the 2012 federal budget. President Obama visits Parkville Middle School and Center of Technology in Baltimore County, Maryland, to highlight educational priorities in his proposed 2012 budget.
- February 15 – President Obama presents the Presidential Medal of Freedom to fifteen people in a ceremony at the White House.
- February 17 – President Obama and the CEOs of major technology companies—including Carol Bartz, John Chambers, Dick Costolo, Larry Ellison, Reed Hastings, Steve Jobs, Art Levinson, Eric Schmidt, Steve Westly, Mark Zuckerberg, and Stanford University president John L. Hennessy—meet at the home of John Doerr to discuss the President's innovation initiatives.
- February 22 – The President speaks at the Winning the Future Forum on Small Business at Cleveland State University.
- February 23 – President Obama visits with wounded service members and their families at the National Naval Medical Center and awards six Purple Heart medals. President Obama delivers a televised statement on the situation in Libya.
- February 27 – The 2011 Governors' Dinner is hosted by President Obama in the State Dining Room of the White House. The President makes an appearance in a pre-recorded clip shown during the 83rd Academy Awards ceremony.

== March ==
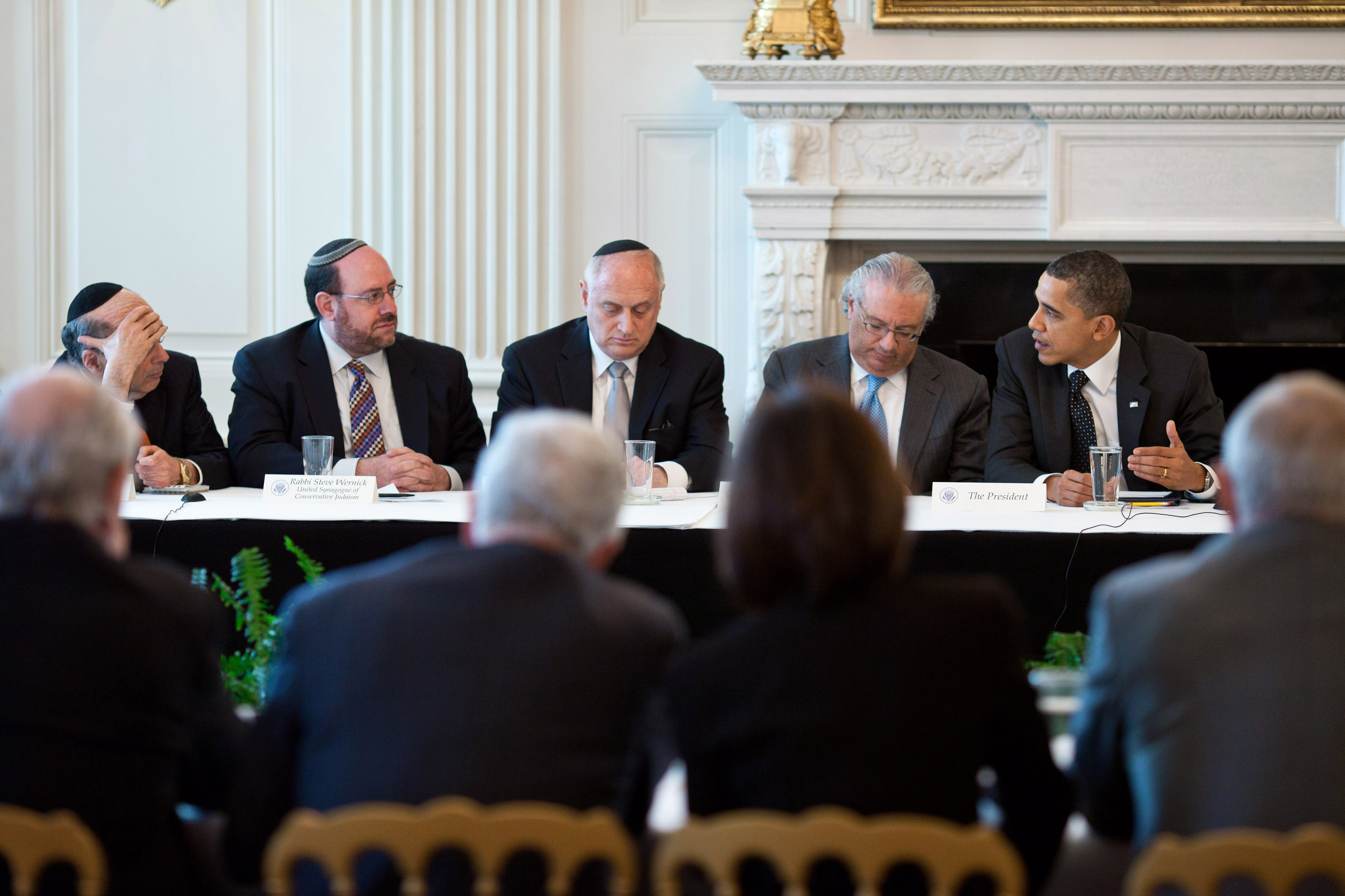
March 1: Obama meets with leaders of Major American Jewish Organizations, including Malcolm Hoenlein (center, looking down).

- March 1 – President Obama meets with the Conference of Presidents of Major American Jewish Organizations in the State Dining Room of the White House.
- March 2 – President Obama presents the National Medal of Arts and the National Humanities Medal to awardees in a ceremony at the White House. The President signs a short-term budget extension bill to fund the federal government through March 18.
- March 3 – President Obama holds meetings and a press conference with President Felipe Calderón of Mexico.
- March 7 – President Obama holds meetings and a press conference with Prime Minister Julia Gillard of Australia.
- March 8 – The President ends his two-year ban on military trials for detainees held at Guantanamo Bay with Executive Order 13567.
- March 10 – The President and First Lady host the first Conference on Bullying Prevention at the White House.
- March 18 – President Obama orders military air strikes against Muammar Gaddafi's forces in Libya in his address to the nation from the White House. Shortly afterward, the President travels to Rio de Janeiro, Brazil to meet with President Dilma Rousseff.
- March 21 – The First Family arrives in Santiago, Chile.
- March 26 – President Obama addressed the nation from the White House, providing an update on the current state of the military intervention in Libya.
- March 28 – President Obama delivers a speech at the National Defense University explaining his rationale for ordering United States military intervention in Libya.
- March 30 – President Obama discusses domestic energy policy and hybrid vehicles at Georgetown University.

== April ==
"Remarks on Birth Certificate, et alia"
Barack Obama issues remarks on the release of his long form birth certificate (4-27-2011)

- April 4 – President Obama announces his bid for re-election.
- April 5 – The President meets with congressional leaders to discuss the ongoing federal budget debate; later in the day, President Obama meets with Israeli President Shimon Peres.
- April 6 – After trips to Philadelphia and New York City earlier in the day, the President calls an evening meeting with Speaker of the House John Boehner and Senate Majority Leader Harry Reid to discuss the ongoing federal budget debate.
- April 27 – The White House releases a copy of President Obama's "long-form" birth certificate.
- April 29 – The President meets with participants of the 1968 Memphis sanitation strike at the White House; travels to Alabama to view damage from the recent tornado outbreak and meet with Governor Robert J. Bentley; and delivers the commencement address at Miami Dade College.
- April 30 – President Obama attends the annual White House Correspondents' Association Dinner.

== May ==
President Obama on Osama bin Laden's Death
President Obama's address

- May 2 – President Obama confirms that Al Qaeda leader Osama bin Laden has been killed.
- May 5 – The President lays a wreath at "Ground Zero" in New York City after visiting with police and firefighters there.
- May 6 – President Obama visits Fort Campbell where he meets with members of SEAL Team Six who participated in the raid on Osama bin Laden's compound; the President also awards Presidential Unit Citations to the military units involved in the operation.
- May 10 – President Obama delivers a speech in El Paso, Texas, on immigration reform.
- May 23 – President Obama begins a state visit to Ireland.
- May 24 – President Obama arrives in United Kingdom for a state visit.
- May 26 – President Obama attends the G8 summit in Deauville, France.
- May 29 – President Obama visits Joplin, Missouri, in response to the city's recent tornado destruction.

== June ==
- June 3 – President Obama travels to Toledo, Ohio, and delivers remarks to workers at the Chrysler Group Toledo Supplier Park.
- June 7 – The President welcomes German Chancellor Angela Merkel to the White House for a state visit.
- June 14 – President Obama visits Puerto Rico, the first such trip by a sitting U.S. president since John F. Kennedy.
- June 18 – President Obama teams up with Speaker of the House John Boehner in a round of golf against Vice President Biden and Ohio Governor John Kasich.
- June 22 – President Obama in his address to the nation from the White House announces his plan to withdraw 33,000 U.S. troops from Afghanistan by the summer of 2012.

== July ==
- July 10–14 – The President holds a series of daily meetings with Congressional leaders at the White House in an attempt to reach an agreement on raising the debt ceiling.
- July 24 – President Obama calls House Minority Leader Nancy Pelosi and Senate Majority Leader Harry Reid to the White House for an update on negotiations concerning the ongoing debt ceiling impasse.
- July 25 – The President delivers a prime time television address about the debt ceiling debate.

== August ==
- August 2 – The President signs into law the Budget Control Act of 2011, (Pub. L. 112–25 (text) (PDF), S. 365, 125 Stat. 240, enacted August 2, 2011), to raise the federal debt ceiling, avoid default, and create a bipartisan "super committee" to deliberate on debt reductions.
- August 9 – President Obama—accompanied by high-ranking military officials and Secretary of Defense Leon Panetta—travels to Dover Air Force Base to pay his respects to troops killed when their helicopter was downed in Afghanistan.
- August 15–17 – President Obama embarks on a three-day, five-city bus tour to host town hall meetings to discuss the economy and jobs. On August 15, the President stopped in Cannon Falls, Minnesota, and Decorah, Iowa. The President is scheduled to make stops in Peosta, Iowa, on August 16 and in Atkinson, Illinois, and Alpha, Illinois, on August 17.
- August 18 – President Obama calls for Syrian President Bashar al-Assad to step down and issues an executive order prohibiting certain financial transactions with Syria.
- August 26–27 – President Obama returns a day early to Washington, D.C., from his vacation on Martha's Vineyard ahead of Hurricane Irene. In response to the hurricane, the President declares a state of emergency for Connecticut, Massachusetts, New Hampshire, New Jersey, New York, and Virginia.

== September ==
- September 8 – In a speech delivered to a joint session of Congress, President Obama presents the American Jobs Act, his plan to create jobs and revive the economy.
- September 12 – The President delivers a speech in the White House Rose Garden to promote his American Jobs Act.
- September 16 – President Obama signs the America Invents Act, (H.R. 1249), a major overhaul of the U.S. patent system, into law.
- September 19 – The President releases his debt reduction plan and the Buffett Rule.

== October ==
- October 6 – The President, speaking at a press conference from the White House, urges the Senate to pass his American Jobs Act.
- October 11 – The President asks Harry Reid to hold votes on separate parts of his American Jobs Act after it fails to secure a filibuster-proof supermajority in the Senate.
- October 13 – The President and First Lady host their fifth state dinner at the White House to honor South Korean President Lee Myung-bak.
- October 14 – In a letter to Congress, President Obama announces that he has authorized the deployment of "about 100" U.S. troops to Africa "to provide assistance to regional forces that are working toward the removal of Joseph Kony" (leader of the Lord's Resistance Army).
- October 16 – The President speaks at the dedication ceremony for the Martin Luther King, Jr. Memorial in Washington, D.C.
- October 17–19 – President Obama makes a three-day bus tour of North Carolina and Virginia to promote his jobs plan.
- October 20 – Speaking from the White House Rose Garden, the President delivers remarks on the death of Muammar Gaddafi.
- October 21 – The President announces that by the end of the year nearly all U.S. troops in Iraq will be withdrawn and the Iraq War will be over.

== November ==
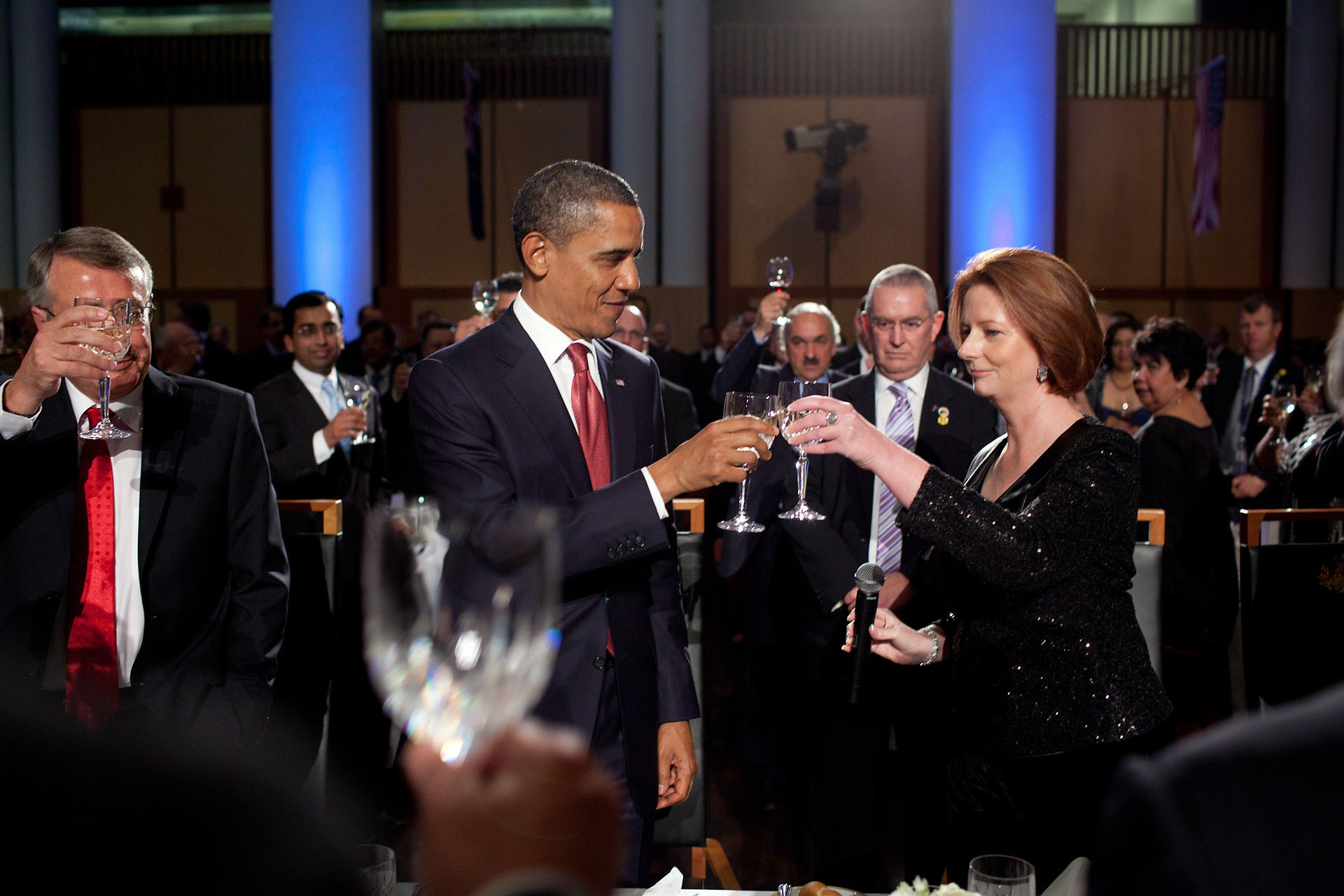
Barack Obama during his visit to Australia in 2011

- November 3 – President Obama attends the G-20 summit in Cannes, France.
- November 11 – The President places a wreath on the Tomb of the Unknowns and speaks at Arlington National Cemetery in honor of Veterans Day. Later in the day, the President and First Lady attend the first annual Carrier Classic aboard the USS Carl Vinson in San Diego.
- November 12–19 – The President attends the APEC economic summit in Honolulu (November 12–15) before traveling to Australia and Bali, Indonesia.
- November 18 – While visiting Bali, Indonesia, President Obama announces Hillary Clinton's plan to visit Burma, the first by a Secretary of State in more than 50 years.
- November 23 – President Obama officially pardons two turkeys, "Liberty" and "Peace", during the National Thanksgiving Turkey Presentation.
- November 28 – President Obama hosts a White House summit for leaders of the European Union to discuss the Euro area crisis.

== December ==
- December 1 – The First Family participates in the National Christmas Tree lighting ceremony.
- December 4 – President Obama offers his condolences to Pakistani President Asif Ali Zardari for the deaths of Pakistani soldiers in a recent NATO attack. The President and First Lady attend the annual Kennedy Center Honors.
- December 5 − President Obama meets at the White House with college presidents on college affordability.
- December 7 − The President holds a bilateral meeting with Prime Minister Stephen Harper of Canada.
- December 12 – President Obama meets with Prime Minister Nouri al-Maliki of Iraq at the White House; later, the two participate in a wreath-laying ceremony at Arlington National Cemetery.
- December 14 – The President and First Lady visit Fort Bragg to mark the end of the Iraq War.
- December 20 – The President and Vice President attend a ceremony at Joint Base Andrews marking the return of the United States Forces – Iraq colors.
- December 29 – The President and First Lady—accompanied by Admiral Robert F. Willard, USN Commander, U.S. Pacific Command, and his wife—visit the USS Arizona Memorial at Pearl Harbor where they observe a moment of silence.
- December 31 – The President signs the National Defense Authorization Act for Fiscal Year 2012 and issues a statement explaining his reservations about specific parts of the act.

== See also ==
- Timeline of the Barack Obama presidency (2009–2017)

U.S. presidential administration timelines
Preceded by Obama presidency (2010)	Obama presidency (2011)	Succeeded by Obama presidency (2012)
