= Timeline of the Barack Obama presidency (2013) =

The following is a timeline of the presidency of Barack Obama, from January 1, 2013 to December 31, 2013. For his time as president-elect, see the presidential transition of Barack Obama; for a detailed account of his first months in office, see first 100 days of Barack Obama's presidency; for a complete itinerary of his travels, see list of presidential trips made by Barack Obama.

== January ==
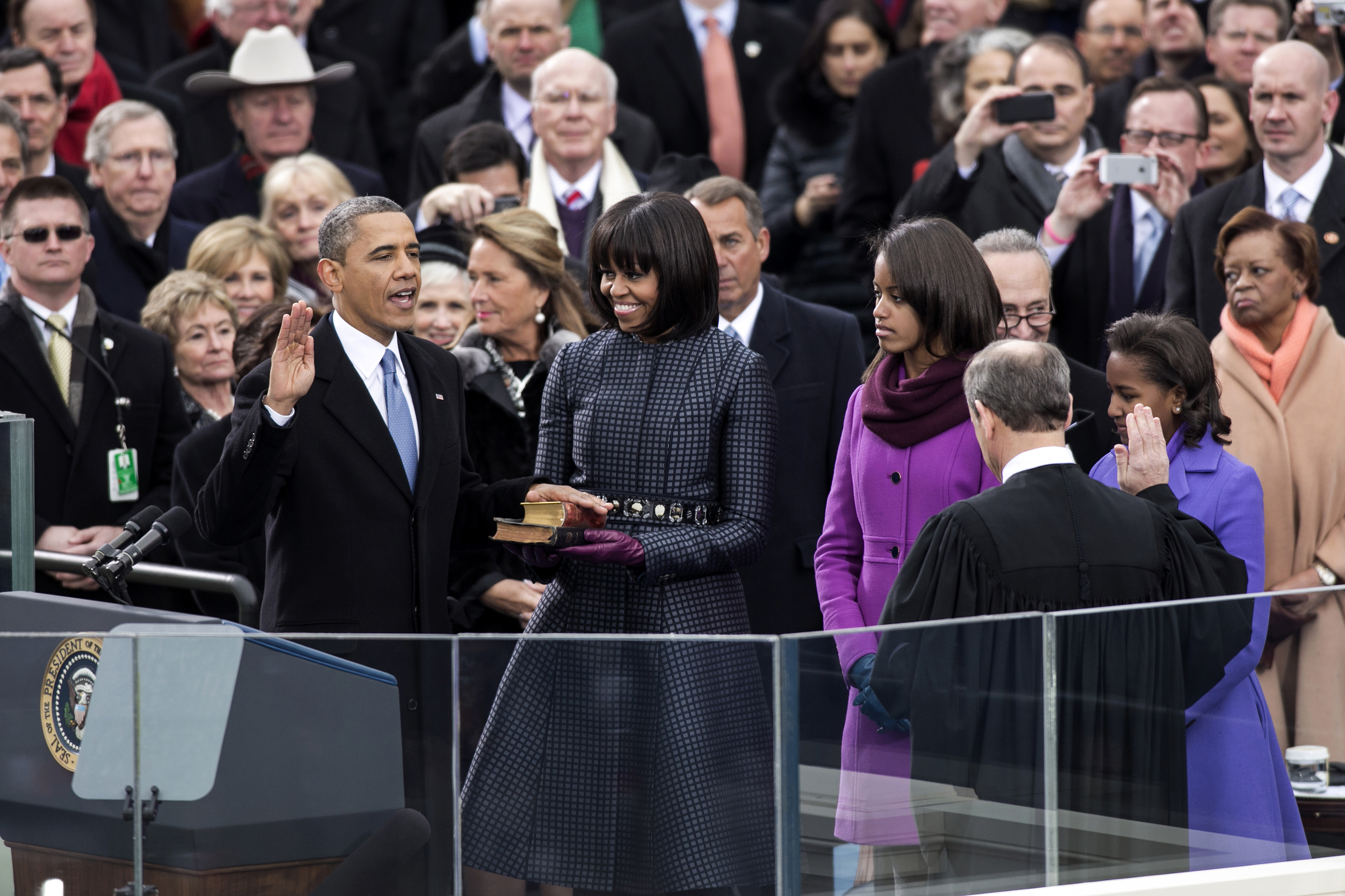
Second Inauguration of Barack Obama

- January 2 – President Obama signs the 2013 National Defense Authorization Act (H.R. 4310) and the American Taxpayer Relief Act of 2012 (H.R. 8) into law.
- January 2 – President Obama praises lawmakers after the House of Representatives votes to pass a Senate "fiscal cliff" measure, which included permanence for middle-class Bush tax cuts.
- January 3 – The 113th United States Congress convenes with the Republican Party is retaining their majority in the House of Representatives while the Democratic Party is retaining their majority in the Senate.
- January 3 – John Boehner is re-elected as Speaker of the United States House of Representatives.
- January 4 – In a joint session of the United States Congress, the results for the electoral college are counted. In his role as President of the Senate, Vice President Joe Biden reads the results and declares President Obama as the winner of the 2012 presidential election.
- January 11 – President Obama holds a joint press conference in Washington, D.C., with Afghan President Hamid Karzai to discuss the eventual withdrawal of U.S. forces from Afghanistan.
- January 14 – The President holds the last press conference of his first term.
- January 16 – President Obama outlines his gun-control proposals.
- January 19 – The President and First Lady take part in the national day of service by volunteering at Burrville Elementary School in Northeast, Washington, D.C.
- January 20 – Barack Obama is sworn into his second term as President of the United States by Supreme Court Chief Justice John Roberts at the White House.
- January 21 – The President, Vice President, and other senior government officials participate in ceremonies related to the second inauguration of Barack Obama.
- January 28 – The President and the Vice President meet with representatives from the Major Cities Chiefs Association and Major County Sheriffs Association to discuss reducing gun violence.
- January 29 – Speaking at Del Sol High School in Las Vegas, President Obama addresses the issue of comprehensive immigration reform.

== February ==
- February 4 – No Budget, No Pay Act of 2013 (H.R. 325) is signed into law by President Obama.
- February 4 – The President holds a roundtable discussion and delivers an address in Minneapolis outlining his gun control campaign.
- February 6 – President Obama attends the Senate Democratic Issues Conference retreat in Annapolis, Maryland.
- February 7 – The President and First Lady attend the annual National Prayer Breakfast at the Washington Hilton in Washington, D.C.

State of the Union address (February 12, 2013) (1:00:05)
Barack Obama's February 12, 2013 State of the Union Address

State of the Union address (February 12, 2013) (audio)
Audio-only version

- February 12 – President Obama delivers his annual State of the Union Address before a joint session of Congress.
- February 12 – During the State of the Union Address, the President announces a drawdown of 34,000 troops from Afghanistan.
- February 15 – Completing a three-city tour, the President addresses students at Chicago's Hyde Park Academy.
- February 22 – President Obama holds a bilateral meeting with Prime Minister Shinzō Abe of Japan.
- February 25 – President Obama speaks to the National Governors Association.

== March ==
- March 1 – President Obama meets with Congressional Leadership on the sequester.
- March 1 – The President signs an order initiating the 2013 Sequestration
- March 7 – The President signs Violence Against Women Reauthorization Act of 2013.
- March 20 – President Obama arrives in Israel, meets with Israeli President Shimon Peres and Prime Minister Benjamin Netanyahu and holds a press conference.
- March 21 – President Obama visits Ramallah in the West Bank, holds a joint news conference with Palestinian Authority President Mahmoud Abbas and, later in the day, speaks at the Jerusalem International Convention Center.
- March 22 – President Obama arrives in Amman, Jordan for extended bilateral meetings with King Abdullah II of Jordan.
- March 26 – Stanley Cup victors the Los Angeles Kings and MLS Cup victors the LA Galaxy visit the White House and meet with the President.

== April ==
- April 2 – President Obama holds bilateral meeting with Prime Minister Lee Hsien Loong of Singapore.
- April 3 – The President speaks at the Denver Police Academy promoting measures to control gun violence.
- April 11 – President Obama presents his proposed 2014 budget to Congress.
- April 11 – The President meets with United Nations Secretary-General Ban Ki-moon.
- April 15 – The President greets NCAA football champions the Alabama Crimson Tide.
- April 16 – President Obama and Crown Prince Mohammad Bin Zayed of the United Arab Emirates have a working lunch at the White House.
- April 18 – President Obama speaks at a prayer service for victims of the Boston Marathon bombing.
- April 23 – The President holds a bilateral meeting with Emir Hamad bin Khalifa Al Thani of Qatar. Later in the day, The President and First Lady attend the opening of the George W Bush Presidential Library, along with former presidents: George W Bush, Bill Clinton, George H.W. Bush, and Jimmy Carter- along with the former First Ladies
- April 26 – The President meets for the second time in a month with Jordan's King Abdullah II.

== May ==
- May 2 – President Obama visits Mexico and meets with President Enrique Peña Nieto to discuss immigration, energy and security.
- May 3 – President Obama spends time in Costa Rica with President Laura Chinchilla.
- May 7 – President Obama holds a bilateral meeting and a press conference with President Park Geun-hye of South Korea.
- May 8 – President Obama meets with a group of Asian-American and Pacific Islander national leaders.
- May 13 – President Obama holds a bilateral meeting and a press conference with Prime Minister David Cameron of the United Kingdom.
- May 15 – Senator John McCain has a private strategy meeting with the President.
- May 16 – President Obama holds a bilateral meeting and working dinner with Prime Minister Recep Tayyip Erdoğan of Turkey.
- May 20 – President Obama holds a bilateral meeting with President Thein Sein of Burma.
- May 23 – President Obama delivers a speech at the National Defense University on the subject of his administrations counter-terrorism policy.
- May 24 – The President delivers the commencement address at the United States Naval Academy.
- May 31 – NATO Secretary General Anders Fogh Rasmussen meets with the President in the Oval Office.

== June ==
- June 4 – President Obama holds a bilateral meeting with President Sebastián Piñera of Chile.
- June 5 – The President welcomes the Super Bowl champion Baltimore Ravens.
- June 7 – The President delivers a statement on the Affordable Care Act in San Jose, CA.
- June 10 – The President delivers remarks on the Equal Pay Act.
- June 11 – The President delivers remarks on Immigration Reform.
- June 11 – President Obama holds a bilateral meeting with President Ollanta Humala of Peru.
- June 13 – President Obama speaks at the LGBT Pride Month celebration in the East Room.
- June 15 - President Obama announces the Climate Action Plan to cut carbon pollution, prepare the Nation for the impacts of climate change, and lead international efforts to address climate change as a global challenge.
- June 17 – The President meets with EU leaders during the G-8 Summit in Lough Erne, Northern Ireland to discuss the Transatlantic Trade and Investment Partnership.
- June 26 – The President outlines his second-term environmental strategy in a speech on climate change. The President and First Lady arrive in Senegal where they begin a multi-country trip through Africa including South Africa and Tanzania.

== July ==
- July 2 – The President and First Lady conclude their African trip in Tanzania. President Obama has bilateral meeting with President Kikwete.
- July 9 – The President meets with members of the Congressional Black Caucus.
- July 10 – The President meets with members of the Congressional Hispanic Caucus.
- July 11 – President Obama meets with Senator John McCain and Senator Charles Schumer to discuss immigration reform.
- July 11 – Chinese Vice-Premier Wang Yang and state councilor Yang Jiechi meet with President Obama to discuss the US-China Strategic and Economic Dialogue.
- July 17 – President Obama makes a statement on confirmation of Richard Cordray as director of the Consumer Financial Protection Bureau.
- July 19 – Following the not guilty verdict in the George Zimmerman trial, President Obama gives a speech in the White House Press Room, in which he addresses the killing of Trayvon Martin, racial profiling, and the state of race relations in the United States.
- July 22 – President Obama honors the 2013 NCAA Men's Basketball champion Louisville Cardinals.
- July 25 – President Obama holds a bilateral President Truong Tan Sang of Vietnam.
- July 29 – President Obama honors the World Series champion San Francisco Giants.
- July 31 – President Obama honors the NCAA UConn Huskies Women's basketball champion.

== August ==
- August 1 – The President meets with bipartisan members of Congress to discuss the National Security Agency. and, later in the day, holds a bipartisan meeting with President Abd Rabbuh Mansur Hadi of Yemen.
- August 7 – President Obama is interviewed by Jay Leno on The Tonight Show.
- August 8 – President Obama holds a bilateral meeting with Prime Minister Antonis Samaras of Greece.
- August 9 – The Bipartisan Student Loan Certainty Act of 2013 (H.R. 1911) and the Reverse Mortgage Stabilization Act of 2013, amending the National Housing Act to safeguard homeowners, are signed into law by the President.
- August 15 – The President remarks on the situation in Egypt.
- August 19 – The Dodd–Frank Wall Street Reform and Consumer Protection Act (H.R. 4173) is discussed by the President and a group of independent financial regulators.
- August 26 − President Obama awards the Medal of Honor to Staff Sergeant Ty M. Carter of the U.S. Army.
- August 27 – The President meets with mayors of 18 major US cities to discuss reducing youth violence.
- August 28 − President Obama delivers remarks at the Lincoln Memorial "Let Freedom Ring" ceremony commemorating the 50th Anniversary of the March on Washington.
- August 30 – President Obama meets with President Toomas Hendrik Ilves of Estonia, President Dalia Grybauskaitė of Lithuania and Andris Bērziņš of Latvia.
- August 31 – President Obama speaks on the recent chemical attacks in Syria and asks Congress to authorize military action.

== September ==
- September 4 – The President has a bilateral meeting and holds a press conference in Stockholm with Prime Minister Reinfeldt of Sweden. President Obama also meets with King Carl XVI Gustaf of Sweden to discuss the Syrian air strike plan.
- September 5 – President Obama arrives in St. Petersburg, Russia for the G-20 summit. The President conducts a bilateral meeting with Prime Minister Shinzō Abe of Japan to discuss the Syria air strike plan.
- September 6 – The President holds a bilateral meeting with Chinese President Xi Jinping to discuss the Syrian air strike plan. and, later in the day, holds a bilateral meeting with French President François Hollande to also discuss the Syrian air strike plan.
- September 10 – President Obama addresses the nation about Syrian use of chemical weapons.
- September 11 − The President attends September 11 Observance Ceremony at the Pentagon Memorial.
- September 13 – President Obama holds a bilateral meeting with Emir Sabah Al-Ahmad Al-Jaber Al-Sabah of Kuwait.
- September 18 − President Obama delivers remarks to members of the Business Roundtable.
- September 23 – President Obama holds a bilateral meeting with President Goodluck Jonathan of Nigeria.
- September 24 – President Obama addresses the United Nations General Assembly. Afterward, the President holds a bilateral meeting with President Michel Sleiman of Lebanon. Later in the day, the President meets with Secretary-General Ban Ki-moon of the United Nations and separately with President Mahmoud Abbas of the Palestinian Authority.
- September 26 − The President delivers remarks on the Affordable Care Act.
- September 27 – President Obama holds a bilateral meeting with Prime Minister Manmohan Singh of India.
- September 30 – President Obama holds a bilateral meeting and a working lunch with Prime Minister Benjamin Netanyahu of Israel.

== October ==
- October 1 – President Obama remarks on the United States government shutdown and congressional attempts at defunding the Patient Protection and Affordable Care Act.
- October 9 – President Obama meets with the House Democratic Caucus.
- October 10 – President Obama meets with the Senate Democratic Caucus. and, later in the day, with House Republican leadership.
- October 15 – The President presents the Medal of Honor to former Army Captain William D. Swenson.
- October 17 – The Continuing Appropriations Act, 2014 H.R. 2775, containing a continuing resolution ending both the United States federal government shutdown of 2013 and the United States debt-ceiling crisis of 2013 are signed into law by the President. Later in the day, the President holds a bilateral meeting and a working lunch with Prime Minister Enrico Letta of Italy.
- October 18 – Jeh Johnson is presented as President Obama's nominee to become the next Department of Homeland Security secretary.
- October 21 − The President delivers remarks on the Affordable Care Act.
- October 23 − President Obama holds a bilateral meeting with Prime Minister Nawaz Sharif of Pakistan.
- October 24 – The President speaks on the issue of Immigration Reform.

== November ==
- November 1 – President Obama holds a bilateral meeting with Prime Minister Nouri al-Maliki of Iraq. Later that day, the President signs an executive order preparing the United States for the impacts of climate change.
- November 4 – President Obama welcomes the Stanley Cup champion Chicago Blackhawks to the White House.
- November 5 − President Obama visits the Walter Reed National Military Medical Center in Bethesda, Maryland.
- November 13 − The President delivers remarks at the 2013 Tribal Nations Conference.
- November 14 − President Obama remarks about the Affordable Care Act.
- November 20 – President Obama honors sixteen Presidential Medal of Freedom recipients and participates in a wreath-laying ceremony at Arlington National Cemetery.
- November 21 − The President signs H.R. 2747: Streamlining Claims Processing for Federal Contractor Employees Act, S. 330: HIV Organ Policy Equity Act, and S. 893: Veterans' Compensation Cost-of-Living Adjustment Act of 2013 into law.
- November 22 − President Obama holds a bilateral meeting with King Mohammed VI of Morocco.
- November 25 – President Obama delivers a speech on Immigration Reform in San Francisco.

== December ==
- December 3 – President Obama holds a bilateral meeting and a working lunch with President Juan Manuel Santos of Colombia.
- December 3 – President Obama remarks about the Affordable Care Act.
- December 5 – Chris Matthews interviews the President before a student audience at American University.
- December 10 – President Obama joins other world leaders at the state memorial service for Nelson Mandela in Johannesburg, South Africa.
- December 20 – President Obama holds his final press conference of 2013.

== See also ==
- Timeline of the Barack Obama presidency (2009–2017)

U.S. presidential administration timelines
| Preceded by Obama presidency (2012) | Obama presidency (2013) | Succeeded by Obama presidency (2014) |
