= American Jobs Act =

U.S. bills recommended by Barack Obama

President Obama presenting the American Jobs Act to Congress

The American Jobs Act (S. 1549) (H. Doc. 112-53) and (H.R. 12) was the informal name for a pair of bills recommended by U.S. President Barack Obama in a nationally televised address to a joint session of Congress on Thursday, September 8, 2011. He characterized the proposal as a collection of non-controversial measures designed to get Americans back to work, and he repeatedly urged Congress to pass it "right away"; he also said that the bills would not add to the national deficit and would be fully paid for.

== Background ==
Since the start of the great recession, unemployment and underemployment levels in the U.S. have remained stubbornly high. Through the resulting "jobless recovery," consumer confidence has remained shaky, raising the specter of a double dip recession.

In August 2011, the U.S. Congress agreed on raising the debt ceiling and a reduction in deficits within the next decade. The acrimonious debate leading to the passage of this bill made clear that some in the United States Congress considered national default to be a viable political option. Following passage, Standard & Poor's downgraded the United States top credit rating from AAA to AA+ citing various factors including the long term political struggle to raise the debt ceiling and a lack of credible plans to reduce federal spending and increase tax revenue. Economic data released in July and August 2011 came in worse than expected, and worldwide stock markets tumbled quickly raising the fear of a new recession. After Labor Day, President Obama, in a major speech before a joint session of Congress, detailed a major new jobs package and urged the Congress to pass it without delay.

== President's address to Congress ==
Obama's speech aired in the United States on 11 television networks during primetime, including ABC, CBS, NBC, CNN, Fox News Channel, Fox Business Network, MSNBC, and CNBC. Nielsen Media Research estimate that 31.4 million viewers watched the speech, 10 million less than the 2011 State of the Union Address, but six million more than his March speech on Libya. The President's address was rescheduled to September 8 after his original request to deliver the speech on September 7 was rebuffed by Speaker of the House John Boehner, who cited a clash with a Republican Presidential debate already scheduled for the same time and stated that more time was required to secure the House for the President's visit. The President made his speech at 7:00pm Eastern, instead of the usual 9:00pm start for presidential addresses to joint sessions of Congress, so he would be finished before the first game of the National Football League season between the New Orleans Saints and the Green Bay Packers at 8:30pm.

The Republicans declined to broadcast an official opposition response, as it is traditionally done after a presidential address to a joint session of Congress. This decision was criticized by House Minority Leader Nancy Pelosi as being "disrespectful" to the president and the American people. However Boehner denied any of this. "This is not a State of the Union address. The American people shouldn't be forced to watch some politician they don't want to listen to. And frankly, most of them would rather watch a football game," he said, referencing the aforementioned Saints-Packers game. However, Congress members were still available to respond to Obama's speech individually. Boehner later released a statement after the speech saying that "the proposals the president outlined tonight merit consideration. We hope he gives serious consideration to our ideas as well."

== Elements of the bill ==
The White House provided a fact sheet which summarizes the key provisions of the $447 billion bill. Some of its elements include:

1. Cutting and suspending $245 billion worth of payroll taxes for qualifying employers and 160 million medium to low income employees.
2. Spending $62 billion for a Pathways Back to Work Program for expanding opportunities for low-income youth and adults.
  1. $49 billion - Extending unemployment benefits for up to 6 million long-term beneficiaries.
  2. $8 billion - Jobs tax credit for the long term unemployed.
  3. $5 billion - Pathways back to work fund.
3. Spending $50 billion on both new & pre-existing infrastructure projects.
4. Spending $35 billion in additional funding to protect the jobs of teachers, police officers, and firefighters
5. Spending $30 billion to modernize at least 35,000 public schools and community colleges.
6. Spending $15 billion on a program that would hire construction workers to help rehabilitate and refurbishing hundreds of thousands of foreclosed homes and businesses.
7. Creating the National Infrastructure Bank (capitalized with $10 billion), originally introduced in 2007, to help fund infrastructure via private and public capital.
8. Creating a nationwide, interoperable wireless network for public safety, while expanding accessibility to high-speed wireless services.
9. Prohibiting discrimination in hiring against persons who are unemployed because of their status as unemployed persons.
10. Loosening regulations on small businesses that wish to raise capital, including through crowdfunding, while retaining investor protections.

In total the legislation includes $253 billion in tax credits (56.6%) and $194 billion in spending and extension of unemployment benefits (43.4%).

== Legislative history ==
American Jobs Act, S. 1549

In the Senate, the bill was stalled by Majority leader Harry Reid on September 27, 2011 who said

I don't think there's anything more important for a jobs measure than China trade, and that's what we're going to work on next week.

On October 4, 2011, Minority Leader Mitch McConnell attempted to offer the Act as an amendment to the China trade bill, saying that while he disagreed with the bill's approach to job creation, it deserved to be voted on. On October 5, Reid announced a plan to pay for the American Jobs Act with a 5% surtax on incomes of more than $1 million a year.

In the House of Representatives, as a matter of procedure; on September 12, 2011 The Speaker pro tempore laid before the House a message from the President transmitting the legislative proposal, referred to committee and ordered it to be printed (H. Doc. 112-53). Officially H.R. 12, was introduced on September 21, 2011, by Rep. John Larson, D-Conn.

On October 11, the bill was voted on in the Senate where it failed to garner the necessary sixty votes to proceed. In response Obama vowed to break the bill into several smaller derivative bills.

The first of these bills, was the Teachers and First Responders Back to Work Act of 2011, S. 1723, which would have provided $30 billion in state aid to hire teachers and $5 billion for first responders. The bill was introduced by Senator Robert Menendez on October 17, 2011 and failed in a 50–50 vote for cloture on October 20, 2011. In the failed motion to proceed to consider the legislation, 50 Democrats voted in favor of opening debate on the legislation and 47 Republican Senators, joined by 3 Democratic Senators (Joseph Lieberman, Ben Nelson, and Mark Pryor) voted no. The $35 billion bill providing funding to state governments for public school teachers, police and firefighters would've been paid for with a 0.5% tax on incomes in excess of $1 million annually, beginning January 1, 2013.

The second of these bills, was the Rebuild America Jobs Act, S. 1769, a bill to put workers back on the job while rebuilding and modernizing America, would've spent $50 billion on transportation infrastructure projects and $10 billion to fund an "infrastructure bank." The bill was introduced by Senator Amy Klobuchar on October 31, 2011 and failed in a 51–49 vote for cloture on November 3, 2011. In the failed motion to proceed to consider the legislation, 51 Democrats voted in favor of opening debate on the legislation and 47 Republicans Senators, joined by 1 Democratic Senator Ben Nelson and 1 Independent Senator Joseph Lieberman, voted no. The $60 billion bill investing in roads, bridges and infrastructure, would have been paid with a 0.7% tax on Americans earning more than $1 million per year.

A third component was scheduled to receive a cloture vote in the US Senate on November 7, 2011. H.R. 674, a bill to amend the Internal Revenue Code of 1986 to repeal the imposition of 3 percent withholding on certain payments made to vendors by government entities, was an element of the larger American Jobs Act and passed the US House of Representatives on a bipartisan 405–16 vote. Senate Democrats planned to attach an amendment to H.R. 674 to include an additional element of the American Jobs Act, which would give businesses incentives to hire unemployed and disabled veterans. The "Vow to Hire Heroes Act of 2011" would be funded by "existing funding mechanisms" from the Department of Veteran Affairs, including adjusting the fee structure for Veterans Affairs Department home loans, as opposed to the tax on Americans making more than $1 million a year, which was part of the prior Senate jobs bills. A prior nill version of the 3% withholding repeal by Senate Republicans had failed in the Senate on a 57-43 cloture vote, as Senate Democrats opposed the Senate Republicans plan to fund the lost tax revenue via $30 billion in spending cuts. In the failed cloture vote 47 Senate Republicans were joined by 10 Senate Democrats in voting to open debate on the Withholding Tax Relief Act of 2011, S. 1726.

Another element of the Act was passed on March 27, 2012 as part of the Jumpstart Our Business Startups Act. At issue was a White House proposal to "work with the SEC to conduct a comprehensive review of securities regulations from the perspective of these small companies to reduce the regulatory burdens on small business capital formation in ways that are consistent with investor protection, including expanding 'crowdfunding' opportunities and increasing mini-offerings." The proposal had originated on January 31, 2011 as part of the President's Startup America initiative, and the JOBS Act included the requested provisions. The President signed the bill on April 5, 2012.

=== Related bills ===
On September 14, Republican Louie Gohmert introduced his own "American Jobs Act of 2011" into the House as H.R. 2911. The bill would repeal the corporate income tax.

Another related bill passed is the Surface and Air Transportation Programs Extension Act of 2011. President Barack Obama signed the Surface and Air Transportation Program Extension Act of 2011 on September 16, 2011 (Public Law No. 112-30). The law extends taxes which fund federal highway expenditures through March and the Federal Aviation Administration through January. Jobs for many construction workers were retained and created because of the extension of this act.

== Making the case ==
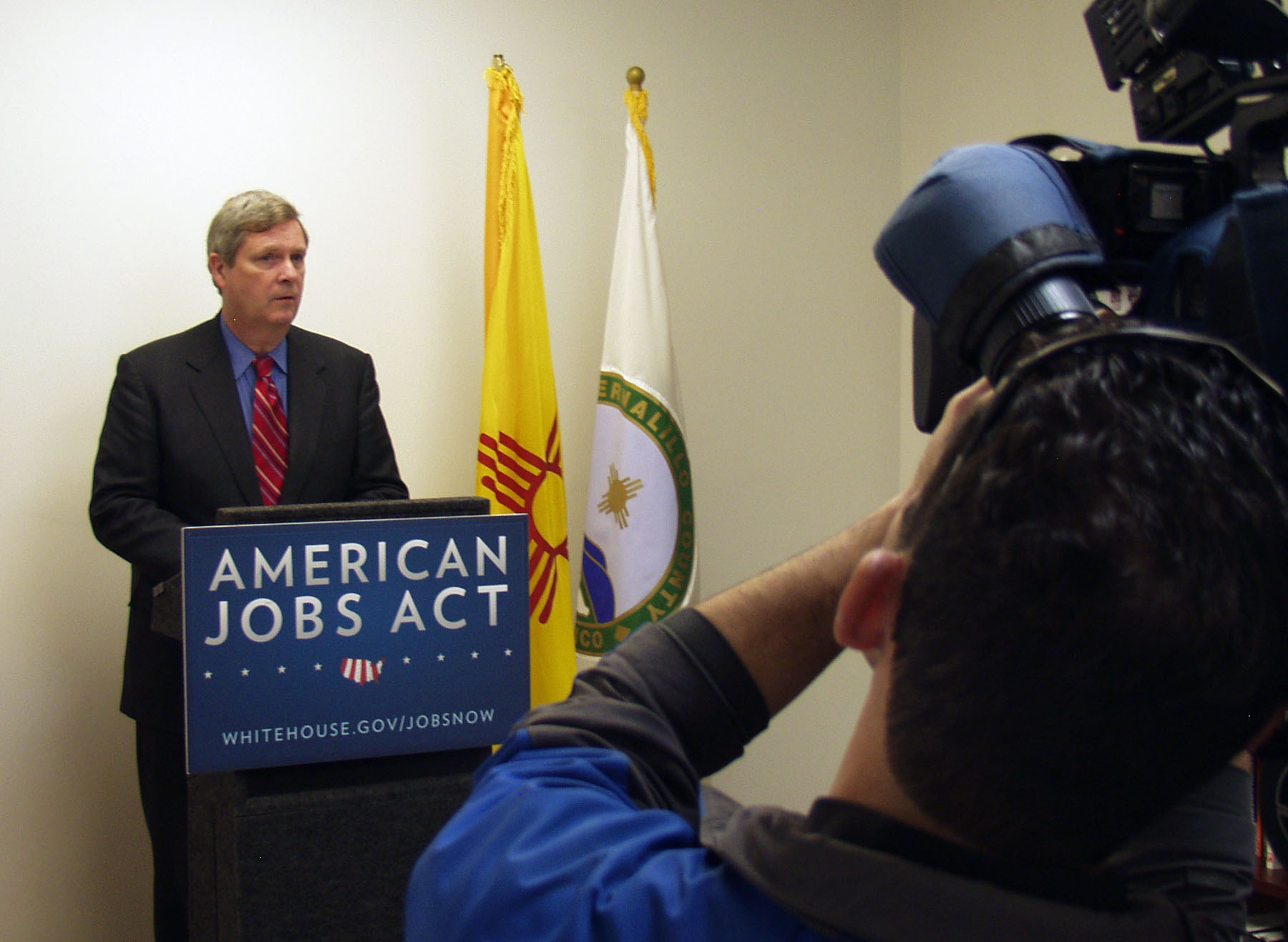
Agriculture Secretary Tom Vilsack speaking on behalf of the American Jobs Act in Albuquerque, New Mexico, December 8, 2011

Obama toured the country making appearances at various speaking events to promote his legislative recommendation. He appeared before constituents of Eric Cantor's congressional district to press the Congress to pass his bill immediately. On September 12, he gave a speech in the White House Rose Garden in front of a group of teachers, police officers, construction workers and small-business owners in which he stated that

if Congress does not act, just about every family in America will pay more taxes next year. That would be a self-inflicted wound that our economy just cannot afford right now.

In Speaker Boehner's home state of Ohio, Obama gave a speech described as "fiery" in a Columbus high school that led to the audience chanting: "Pass this bill!" In a campaign-style rally at North Carolina State University, Obama told college students

Every single one of you can help make this bill a reality. The time for hand-wringing is over. The time for moping around is over. We've got to kick off our bedroom slippers and put on our marching shoes.

At a black-tie dinner for the Congressional Hispanic Caucus Institute, Obama pitched his jobs plan to Latinos. In an October press conference, Obama responded to the suggestion from a reporter that his jobs tour was part of a political campaign, saying

The question is, will Congress do something? If Congress does something, then I can't run against a 'do nothing' Congress. If Congress does nothing, then it's not a matter of me running against them. I think the American people will run them out of town.

== Reception ==
=== Republicans and conservatives ===
Republicans and conservative radio hosts were quick to label the American Jobs Act as "son of stimulus" after the controversial American Recovery and Reinvestment Act of 2009. Martin Feldstein, a Harvard economist and Obama appointee to the Economic Recovery Advisory Board, put the price tag on the American Jobs Act at about $200,000 per job, which Republicans argue as the true cost of the legislation. Conservative commentator Brian Darling criticized the act, comparing it with the stimulus, and stated that since the act is based on the same ideas, it is unlikely to have a more positive outcome. Some Republican Members of Congress opposed the act for partisan reasons, with one telling the press anonymously,

Obama is on the ropes; why do we appear ready to hand him a win?

Republican Majority Leader Eric Cantor indicated that it would be a tough bill to pass quickly:

Insisting that this body and the two sides here agree on everything is not a reasonable expectation.

House Speaker Boehner said the president's bill should be analyzed immediately by the Congressional Budget Office for scoring before the Administration and Congress pursue negotiations. Cantor confirmed to a reporter on October 3 that the bill as a complete package was effectively "dead" and that only parts of the American Jobs Act would be passed. With Obama stating a willingness to consider a piecemeal approach on the legislation, Cantor said,

At this point, I think that Washington has become so dysfunctional that we've got to start focusing on the incremental progress we can make. Both sides want to do the big, bold things -- the problem is they look vastly different.

=== Democrats ===
Many Democrats balked at the bill, siding with the Republicans, especially those facing difficult re-elections in congressional districts where they were hesitant to support unpopular legislation. A majority of the Democrats supported individual components of the bill, but were unwilling to commit to the bill in its entirety, despite the White House's disapproval of the weak showing of support. While some Democrats were opposed to the bill due to the inclusion of tax breaks, others opposed the extent of spending.

Both moderate and liberal Democrats have expressed concerns about the bill. Joe Manchin openly voiced his opposition to the Administration by arguing against the inclusion of too much spending, given by his remarks on September 29,

The ugly part of that act is $450 billion of spending, after we've spent, spent, spent.

On the other side, Peter DeFazio argued against the inclusion of nearly $250 billion of tax breaks, saying:

Half of it is tax cuts, and quite frankly tax cuts don't work.
