= Timeline of the Barack Obama presidency (2015) =

The following is a timeline of the presidency of Barack Obama, from January 1 to December 31, 2015. For his time as president-elect, see the presidential transition of Barack Obama; for a detailed account of his first months in office, see first 100 days of Barack Obama's presidency; for a complete itinerary of his travels, see list of presidential trips made by Barack Obama.

== January ==
- January 3 – The 114th United States Congress convenes with the Republican Party retaining their majority in the House of Representatives and controlling the Senate.
- January 3 – John Boehner is re-elected Speaker of the United States House of Representatives.
- January 6 – President Obama holds a bilateral meeting with President Enrique Peña Nieto of Mexico. Later in the day the President meets with the National Governors Association's top two officers, Colorado Gov. John Hickenlooper and Utah Gov. Gary Herbert, laying out an agenda for the federal government.
- January 7 – The President makes remarks about the multiple terrorist attacks in France.
- January 9 – President Obama proposed the Free Community College Plan making two years of community college free for those willing to work for it.
- January 12 − The President honors the 2014 NBA Champions the San Antonio Spurs.
- January 15- Secretary of State John Kerry holds a meeting with the Prime Minister of Bulgaria Boyko Borisov in Sofia. They discuss energy projects, EU-Russia relations and other issues.
- January 16 – President Obama holds a bilateral meeting and a press conference with Prime Minister David Cameron of the United Kingdom.
- January 19 − The President & First Lady honor Martin Luther King Jr. at the Boys & Girls Club in Washington, D.C., as their Day of Service.

State of the Union address (January 20, 2015) (1:01:32)
Barack Obama's January 20, 2015 State of the Union Address

State of the Union address (January 20, 2015) (audio)
Audio-only version

- January 20 – President Obama delivers his annual State of the Union Address before a joint session of Congress.
- January 22 – President Obama holds a live interview with YouTube personalities Bethany Mota, GloZell Green and Hank Green.
- January 23 − President Obama meets with Otto Perez Molina, President of Guatemala, Juan Orlando Hernández, President of Honduras, and Salvador Sanchez Ceren, President of El Salvador. Later that day, the President delivers remarks at the U.S. Conference of Mayors.
- January 27 − President Obama meets with Kailash Satyarthi, who was awarded the Nobel Peace Prize in 2014. Later that day, the President and King Salman of Saudi Arabia hold a bilateral meeting in Riyadh, Saudi Arabia.

== February ==
- February 2 − President Obama honors the 2014 NHL Champion Los Angeles Kings and the 2014 MLS Cup Champion LA Galaxy.
- February 3 – President Obama holds a bilateral meeting with King Abdullah II of Jordan
- February 4 – President Obama releases his proposal for the 2016 federal budget.
- February 9 – President Obama holds a bilateral meeting and a press conference with Chancellor Angela Merkel of Germany.
- February 10 – The President meets with Ebola Response supporters and delivers remarks.
- February 12 – President Obama signs the Clay Hunt Suicide Prevention for American Veterans Act into law.
- February 13 – President Obama delivers remarks at the Cybersecurity and Consumer Fraud Summit in San Francisco, California.
- February 19 – The President delivers remarks at the White House Summit on Countering Violent Extremism.
- February 23 – President Obama delivers remarks to the National Governors Association.
- February 24 – President Obama holds a bilateral meeting with Emir Tamim bin Hamad al Thani of Qatar.
- February 27 – President Obama holds a bilateral meeting with President Ellen Johnson Sirleaf of Liberia.

== March ==
- March 2 – The President participates in a video conference with British Prime Minister David Cameron, French President Francois Hollande, German Chancellor Angela Merkel, Italian Prime Minister Matteo Renzi, and European Council President Donald Tusk to discuss Ukraine and global security.
- March 3 – President Obama signs H.R. 240, the Department of Homeland Security Appropriations Act, 2015 into law.
- March 9 – The President holds a bilateral meeting with European Council President Donald Tusk. The President also signs Executive Order 13692 - Blocking the property and suspending entry of certain persons that are contributing to the situation in Venezuela.
- March 17 – President Obama holds a bilateral meeting with Taoiseach of Ireland, Enda Kenny.
- March 19 – The President signs an executive order, Planning for Sustainability in the Next Decade. Later that day, Prince Charles, Prince of Wales and Camilla, Duchess of Cornwall meet with the President in the White House.
- March 24 – President Obama holds a bilateral meeting and a press conference with President Ashraf Ghani of Afghanistan.
- March 31 – The President signs a Memorandum of Disapproval on S.J.Res.8, a joint resolution providing for congressional disapproval of the rule submitted by the National Labor Relations Board relating to representation case procedures.

== April ==
- April 9 – The President holds a bilateral meeting with Prime Minister Portia Simpson-Miller of Jamaica in Kingston. Later in the day, the Presidents speaks at CARICOM, an organization of 15 Caribbean nations and dependencies.
- April 10–11 – The President holds a bilateral meeting with President Juan Carlos Varela of Panama prior to attending the 7th Summit of the Americas in Panama City, Panama.
- April 14 – President Obama holds a bilateral meeting with Prime Minister Haider al-Abadi of Iraq.
- April 15 − The President meets with President Ellen Johnson Sirleaf of Liberia, President Alpha Condé of Guinea, and President Ernest Bai Koroma of Sierra Leone to pledge support of effort to combat Ebola.
- April 16 – President Obama signs the Medicare Access and CHIP Reauthorization Act of 2015 into law.
- April 17 – President Obama holds a bilateral meeting and a press conference with Prime Minister Matteo Renzi of Italy.
- April 18 – The President speaks about combatting the threat of climate change and to keeping ourselves and future generations safe.
- April 20 – President Obama holds a bilateral meeting with Crown Prince Mohammed bin Zayed al-Nahyan of United Arab Emirates.
- April 20 – The President honors the 2015 College Football National Champs, the Ohio State Buckeyes.
- April 23 – The President honors the Super Bowl Champion New England Patriots.
- April 27 – President Obama visits the Lincoln Memorial with Japanese Prime Minister Shinzō Abe as part of the latter's state visit to the United States.
- April 28 – The Obamas host a state dinner at the White House for Japanese Prime Minister Shinzō Abe.
- April 29 – President Obama delivers remarks honoring the top teachers from all 50 states and the 2015 National Teacher of the Year, Shanna Peeples.
- April 30 − The President signs the Energy Efficiency Improvement Act of 2015 (Pub. L. 114–11 (text) (PDF)).

== May ==
- May 8 − President Obama delivers a commencement address for the graduating class at Lake Area Technical Institute, one of the top community colleges in the nation, in Watertown, South Dakota.
- May 12 – President Obama speaks at Georgetown University to the Catholic Evangelical Leadership Summit on the topic of "Overcoming Poverty".
- May 13 – President Obama holds a bilateral meeting with Crown Prince Muhammad bin Nayef of Saudi Arabia and Deputy Crown Prince Mohammed bin Salman of Saudi Arabia
- May 13–14 – President Obama and Heads of Delegations of the Gulf Cooperation Council and members of the President's Cabinet meet at Camp David.
- May 15 – President Obama delivers remarks at the National Peace Officers' Memorial Service at the U.S. Capitol.
- May 15 – President Obama visited the Real-Time Tactical Operational Intelligence Center in Camden, New Jersey.
- May 19 – The Rafael Ramos and Wenjian Liu National Blue Alert Act of 2015 (Pub. L. 114–12 (text) (PDF)) was signed by the President.
- May 29 − The President delivers the keynote address at the United States Coast Guard Academy Commencement Exercises in New London, Connecticut.
- May 21 – President Obama meets with Tunisian President Beji Caid Essebsi to assure him of U.S. support.
- May 25 – President Obama lays a wreath at the Tomb of the Unknown Soldier and delivers Memorial Day remarks.
- May 26 − President Obama holds a bilateral meeting with NATO Secretary-General Stoltenberg at the White House to discuss the impact of Russia’s actions, the European security environment, NATO’s efforts and the ongoing Resolute Support Mission to assist the Afghan National Security Forces.

== June ==
- June 1 – President Obama holds a bilateral meeting with King Willem-Alexander and Queen Maxima of the Netherlands.
- June 2 – President Obama presents the Medal of Honor posthumously to Private Henry Johnson and Sergeant William Shemin.
- June 4 – The President honors the 2014 World Series champion San Francisco Giants baseball team.
- June 7–8 – President Obama attends the 41st G7 summit on energy, climate, and terrorism in Schloss Elmau, Germany. On the morning of the 7th, the President holds a bilateral meeting with Chancellor Merkel of Germany to review regional and global issues. On the 8th, the President holds a bilateral meeting with President Hollande of France and a separate meeting with Prime Minister Haider Al-Abadi of Iraq.
- June 19 − The President delivers remarks at the annual meeting of the U.S. Conference of Mayors in San Francisco, California.
- June 26 – President Obama makes a eulogy in Charleston, South Carolina, following the Charleston church shooting.
- June 29 – President Obama visits the Martin Luther King, Jr. Memorial with Brazilian President Dilma Rousseff as part of the latter's state visit to the United States.
- June 30 – President Obama holds a bilateral meeting and a press conference with President Dilma Rousseff of Brazil.

== July ==
- July 1 – President Obama delivers remarks in the White House Rose Garden on the re-establishment of diplomatic relations with Cuba.
- July 6 − President Obama provides an update from the Pentagon on the U.S. mission to degrade and ultimately destroy the terrorist group, ISIL
- July 7 – President Obama holds a bilateral meeting with General Secretary Nguyễn Phú Trọng of Vietnam.
- July 13 − President Obama delivers remarks at the 2015 White House Conference on Aging.
- July 14 – President Obama announces a historic nuclear agreement with Iran.
- July 20 – President Obama holds a bilateral meeting with President Muhammadu Buhari of Nigeria. and later that day delivers remarks at a reception for the 25th anniversary of the Americans with Disabilities Act.
- July 21 − President Obama addresses the 116th National Convention of the Veterans of Foreign Wars in Pittsburgh, Pennsylvania.
- July 22 − President Obama delivers remarks at a reception celebrating the signing into law of the African Growth and Opportunity Act
- July 23−24 − President Obama departs Washington DC en route to Ramstein, Germany on his way to Nairobi, Kenya, his father's homeland. The President arrives in the evening at the Kenyatta International Airport in Nairobi.
- July 25 − President Obama holds a bilateral meeting with President Uhuru Kenyatta of Kenya in Nairobi.
- July 27 − President Obama holds a bilateral meeting with Prime Minister Hailemariam Desalegn of Ethiopia in Addis Ababa.
- July 28 − The President holds a bilateral meeting with African Union Commission Chairperson Dr. Nkosazana Dlamini Zuma in Addis Ababa, Ethiopia.

== August ==
- August 3 − The President delivers remarks at the Young African Leaders Initiative (YALI).
- August 3 – President Obama and the Environment Protection Agency announced the Clean Power Plan to cut carbon pollution from existing power plants by 32% by the year 2030.
- August 4 – President Obama holds a bilateral meeting with Secretary-General Ban Ki-moon of the United Nations.
- August 6 – President Obama delivers remarks to commemorate the 50th anniversary of the Voting Rights Act at the White House.
- August 5 − The President delivers remarks on the nuclear deal reached with Iran at the American University in Washington, DC.
- August 7 – President Obama signs the Sawtooth National Recreation Area and Jerry Peak Wilderness Additions Act.
- August 7 – President Obama begins his 17-day vacation on Martha’s Vineyard, Massachusetts.
- August 24 – President Obama delivers remarks at the National Clean Energy Summit in Las Vegas, Nevada.
- August 27 – President Obama visits New Orleans to commemorate the 10 year anniversary of Hurricane Katrina.
- August 28 – Interior Secretary Sally Jewell officially changes the name of Mount McKinley, the highest mountain in North America, to its native name Denali in all federal documents.

== September ==
- September 1 – President Obama becomes the first sitting president to visit the Arctic Circle when he visits Kotzebue, Alaska, during a conference of ministers and officials from Arctic nations to highlight changes to the Arctic region caused by climate change.
- September 4 – President Obama holds a bilateral meeting with King Salman of Saudi Arabia.
- September 7 – President Obama gives a speech at the Greater Boston Labor Council’s annual Labor Day Breakfast.
- September 22 – President Obama greets Pope Francis as he arrives at Joint Base Andrews.
- September 23 – President Obama welcomes Pope Francis to the White House and, later that day, the Pope spoke about climate change and immigration.
- September 25 – The President welcomes Chinese President Xi Jinping to the White House for a state visit.
- September 25 – The Obamas host a state dinner at the White House for Chinese President Xi Jinping.
- September 28 – President Obama addresses the United Nations General Assembly. Afterward, the President holds a bilateral meeting with President Vladimir Putin of Russia.
- September 29 – President Obama holds a bilateral meeting with President Raúl Castro of Cuba.
- September 29 – President Obama holds a bilateral meeting with Prime Minister Haidar al-Abadi of Iraq.
- September 29 – President Obama holds a bilateral meeting with President Nursultan Nazarbayev of Kazakhstan.

== October ==
- October 7 – President Obama holds a bilateral meeting with President Joachim Gauck of Germany.
- October 9 – President Obama meets with the families of victims of the 2015 Umpqua Community College shooting, then flew to Seattle for the Democratic National Committee roundtable./
- October 15 – President Obama holds a reception for the 25th anniversary of the White House Initiative on Educational Excellence for Hispanics.
- October 16 – President Obama holds a bilateral meeting and a press conference with President Park Geun-hye of South Korea.
- October 22 – President Obama participates in a community forum on drug abuse in Charleston, West Virginia.
- October 22 – President Obama holds a bilateral meeting with Prime Minister Nawaz Sharif of Pakistan.
- October 28 – Prince Harry meets with President Obama in the White House.
- October 29 – Paul Ryan is elected Speaker of the United States House of Representatives.

== November ==
- November 2 − President Obama delivers remarks on criminal justice reform at the Rutgers University campus in Newark.
- November 6 − President Obama announces the State Department's rejection of the proposed Keystone Pipeline.
- November 9 − President Obama holds a bilateral meeting with Prime Minister Benjamin Netanyahu of Israel.
- November 12 − President Obama awards a Medal of Honor to Retired Army Captain Florent Groberg for his efforts in attempting to thwart a suicide bomber in Kunar Province, Afghanistan in August 2012.
- November 13 − President Obama comments on the attacks in Paris.
- November 15 − President Obama participates in the 2015 G-20 Antalya summit in Antalya, Turkey.
- November 17 − President Obama meets with the Philippine Navy in Manila, Philippines, tours the BRP Gregorio del Pilar (PF-15) that was donated by the U.S. Coast Guard to the Philippine Navy in 2011, and announces the U.S. government's donation of the RV Melville and the USCGC Boutwell (WHEC-719) to the Navy.
- November 18 − President Obama participates in the APEC Economic Leaders' Meeting in Manila.
- November 21 − President Obama participates in the Tenth East Asia Summit in Kuala Lumpur, Malaysia.
- November 24 − President Obama holds a bilateral meeting and a press conference with President François Hollande of France.
- November 24 − President Obama awards the Presidential Medal of Freedom to 17 Americans, including filmmaker Steven Spielberg, musicians Gloria and Emilio Estefan, singer James Taylor, composer Stephen Sondheim, violinist Itzhak Perlman, and actress-singer Barbra Streisand.
- November 30 − President Obama participates in the 2015 United Nations Climate Change Conference in Paris.

== December ==
- December 6 – President Obama delivers his third Oval Office address regarding the "broader threat of terrorism, how it has evolved and how it will be defeated," as stated by White House Press Secretary Josh Earnest, following the San Bernardino shooting.
- December 9 − President Obama holds a bilateral meeting with President Reuven Rivlin of Israel.
- December 18 – President Obama holds his final press conference of 2015.
- December 18 – The Obama family leaves Washington for Kailua Beach, Hawaii, to begin their Christmas vacation. En route to Hawaii, President Obama stops by San Bernardino, California, to meet privately with the families of the victims of the San Bernardino attack.
- December 25 – In his Christmas address, President Obama shares well wishes and thanks American troops for their service.

== See also ==
- Timeline of the Barack Obama presidency (2009–2017)

U.S. presidential administration timelines
Preceded by Obama presidency (2014)	Obama presidency (2015)	Succeeded by Obama presidency (2016–2017)
