= Timeline of the Barack Obama presidency (2012) =

The following is a timeline of the presidency of Barack Obama, from January 1, 2012, to December 31, 2012. For his time as president-elect, see the presidential transition of Barack Obama; for a detailed account of his first months in office, see first 100 days of Barack Obama's presidency; for a complete itinerary of his travels, see list of presidential trips made by Barack Obama.

== January ==
- January 4 – The President appoints Richard Cordray as director of the Consumer Financial Protection Bureau despite earlier Senate opposition. In a similar move, President Obama appoints three new members to the National Labor Relations Board.
- January 9 – President Obama announces that Jacob Lew will replace William M. Daley as White House Chief of Staff.
- January 13 – The President requests that Congress reinstate presidential consolidation authority which would give the office power to consolidate federal agencies.
- January 18 – The President rejects a proposed extension of the Keystone Pipeline.

State of the Union address (January 24, 2012) (1:05:13)
Barack Obama's January 24, 2012 State of the Union Address

State of the Union address (January 24, 2012) (audio)
Audio-only version

- January 24 – President Obama delivers his annual State of the Union Address before a joint session of Congress.
- January 25–27 – President Obama travels to five states to encourage support for his economic proposals.
- January 27 – President Obama meets with former president George H. W. Bush and his son, former Florida governor, Jeb Bush, at the White House.
- January 28 – The President attends the annual Alfalfa Club dinner.

== February ==
- February 2 – President Obama speaks at the National Prayer Breakfast.
- February 6 – The President signs an executive order aimed at freezing the assets of Iranian government and financial institutions.
- February 13 – President Obama unveils his spending request for the 2013 federal budget.
- February 14 – The President meets with Chinese Vice President Xi Jinping at the White House to improve relations, promote stability and discuss breaches of human rights.
- February 23 – President Obama apologizes to Afghan President Hamid Karzai for the burning of Korans by NATO troops.

== March ==
- March 8- After announcing that two months before that JPACC would go to North Korea in order to bring back the remains of US MIAS., the Obama administration announcing that JPACC would go to North Korea for Missing MIAS on March 8, 2012,
- March 9 – The President announces his plan to establish the National Network for Manufacturing Innovation.
- March 13 – President Obama attends the first game of the 2012 NCAA Men's Division I Basketball Tournament with visiting British Prime Minister David Cameron. Bilateral meetings were held earlier in the day.
- March 19 – President Obama and Vice President Biden meet with Irish Prime Minister Enda Kenny and attend a St. Patrick's Day luncheon and dinner.
- March 21- Despite its announcement of March 8, 2012, the Obama administration then chose to pursue a policy of a suspension of relations with North Korea over the recovery of US servicemen killed and missing in North Korea.
- March 25 – The President makes his first visit to the Korean Demilitarized Zone ahead of the 2012 Nuclear Security Summit in Seoul. The President holds meetings with Prime Minister Erdoğan of Turkey and President Lee Myung-bak of South Korea.
- March 26 – President Obama holds separate meetings with Prime Minister Nursultan Nazarbayev of Kazakhstan, President Dmitry Medvedev of Russia, President Hu Jintao of China and with Prime Minister Yousaf Raza Gillani of Pakistan to discuss nuclear security, non-proliferation and disarmament.
- March 26 – The President delivers remarks at Hankuk University of Foreign Studies about the spread of nuclear weapons.

== April ==
- April 2 – The North American Leaders' Summit takes place. President Obama hosts Prime Minister Stephen Harper of Canada and President Felipe Calderón of Mexico.
- April 4 – President Obama signs the Stop Trading on Congressional Knowledge Act (STOCK) into law.
- April 5 – President Obama signs the Jumpstart Our Business Startups Act (JOBS) into law.
- April 6 – The President speaks at the White House Forum on Women and the Economy.
- April 9 – President Obama meets with President Dilma Rousseff of Brazil to discuss global economic growth.
- April 13–15 – President Obama attends the 6th Summit of the Americas in Cartagena, Colombia.
- April 19 – BCS National Football Champions University of Alabama Crimson Tide are honored by President Obama at the White House.
- April 23 – NCAA Men's basketball champion Kentucky Wildcats are honored at the White House by President Obama.
- April 30 – President Obama hosts bilateral meetings, a working lunch and press conference with Prime Minister Yoshihiko Noda of Japan.

== May ==
- May 1 – President Obama makes a previously unannounced visit to Afghanistan.
- May 8 – The President delivers the keynote address at the Asian-Pacific American Institute for Congressional Studies (APAICS] 18th gala dinner.
- May 9 – President Obama announces his support of same-sex marriage.
- May 18 – President Obama hosts bilateral meetings, discussing French troop withdrawals from Afghanistan, with French President Francois Hollande prior to Camp David talks.
- May 18–19 – The President hosts a meeting of the leaders of the G8 nations at Camp David.
- May 31 – President Obama signs a bill re-authorizing the Export-Import Bank's charter and increasing the spending cap from $110B to $140B.; President Obama and First Lady Michelle Obama invite former president George W. Bush and former first lady Laura Bush back to the White House for the unveiling of the latter's official White House portraits.

== June ==
- June 8 – The President holds bilateral meetings with President Benigno Aquino of the Philippines and discusses security issues in the Asia-Pacific region.
- June 8 – President Obama honors the XLVI Super Bowl champion New York Giants at the White House.
- June 13 – President Obama presents the Presidential Medal of Freedom to Israeli President Shimon Peres.
- June 14 – The President and First Lady visit the One World Trade Center construction site in Manhattan before two campaign events in the city.
- June 15 – President Obama explains his Executive Order on Immigration ending U.S. deportations of young undocumented immigrants.
- June 18–19 – The President attends the G20 summit in Los Cabos, Mexico, focusing on European financial troubles.
- June 27 – The President lunches with Abu Dhabi Crown Prince Mohammed bin Zayed.
- June 28 – President Obama speaks on health care reform and the Patient Protection and Affordable Care Act from the White House after it is upheld by the Supreme Court.

== July ==
- July 6 – President Obama signs the Surface Transportation Bill (HR4348) bill into law.
- July 23 – President Obama remarks at the 113th National Convention of the Veterans of Foreign Wars.
- July 25 – President Obama speaks to the National Urban League Convention in New Orleans, LA.
- July 27 – The President signs the US-Israel Enhanced Security Co-operation Act in the Oval Office.

== August ==
- August 6 – The President signs the Honoring America's Veterans and Caring for Camp Lejeune Families Act of 2012 into law.
- August 26 – President Obama speaks about Federal Emergency Management Agency preparations for tropical storm Isaac.
- August 31 – President Obama talks to troops, service members and military families at the 1st Aviation Support Battalion hangar in El Paso, Texas.

== September ==
- September 6 – President Obama delivers a speech at the Democratic National Convention in Charlotte, North Carolina.
- September 11 – The President and First Lady participate in multiple 9/11 Memorial events throughout the day.
- September 14 – The President honors members of the 2012 Summer Olympics as well as the 2012 Summer Paralympics at the White House.
- September 18 – The President honors the WNBA champs Minnesota Lynx at the White House.
- September 19 – President Obama presides at an Ambassador Credentials ceremony.
- September 25 – President Obama speaks to the United Nations General Assembly.
- September 25 – President Obama makes remarks at the Clinton Global Initiative.

== October ==
- October 3 – President Obama and former governor Mitt Romney participate in the first presidential debate at University of Denver in Denver, Colorado on various domestic topics. The debate moderator was Jim Lehrer of PBS.
- October 11 – Vice President Joe Biden and Congressman Paul Ryan participate in the only vice presidential debate at Centre College in Danville, Kentucky. The debate was moderated by Martha Raddatz of ABC.
- October 16 – President Obama and former governor Mitt Romney participate in the second presidential debate at Hofstra University in Hempstead, New York on various domestic topics in a town hall format. The debate was moderated by Candy Crowley of CNN.
- October 22 – President Obama and former governor Mitt Romney participate in the third and final presidential debate at Lynn University in Boca Raton, Florida on various foreign policy topics. The debate was moderated by CBS News veteran Bob Schieffer.
- October 25 – President Obama becomes the first sitting United States president to vote early in a presidential election.
- October 31 – The President views Hurricane Sandy damage with New Jersey Governor Christie.

== November ==
- November 6 – The 2012 United States presidential election takes place. President Obama is re-elected, defeating the Republican presidential nominee Mitt Romney.
- November 6 – The Republican Party retains their majority in the House of Representatives and while the Democratic Party retains their majority in the Senate.
- November 9 – President Obama accepts the resignation of Central Intelligence Agency director David Petraeus.
- November 13 – President Obama and Vice President Biden meet with labor leaders for input on deficit reduction.
- November 15 – The President visits the New York City area for a first-hand look at devastation from Hurricane Sandy.
- November 16 – The President and Vice President meet with congressional leaders to discuss the impending "fiscal cliff". A separate meeting was held afterward with various civic leaders.
- November 19 – The President begins his Far East trip with a visit to Burma where he met with Aung San Sui Kyi. Later, President Obama visits Cambodia and meets with Prime Minister Hun Sen.
- November 22 – Two turkeys, Cobbler and Gobbler, are pardoned by the President.
- November 27 – The President and the Vice President meet with President-elect Enrique Peña Nieto of Mexico.
- November 29 – President Obama meets with Mitt Romney for lunch at the White House.

== December ==
- December 3 – The President hosts a bilateral meeting with Prime Minister Boyko Borisov of Bulgaria.
- December 5 – President Obama speaks to the White House Tribal Nations Conference.
- December 7 – The President signs the Child Protection Act of 2012 into law.
- December 8 – President Obama and Vice President Biden attend the Army-Navy football game.
- December 13 – The President and First Lady welcome friends and leaders of the Jewish community to the White House to celebrate the sixth day of Hanukkah.
- December 14 – The President emotionally addresses the nation about the Sandy Hook Elementary School shooting and orders flags to be flown at half-staff at the White House and other U.S. federal government facilities worldwide in respect for the victims.
- December 16 – President Obama speaks at an interfaith vigil in Newtown, Connecticut, with relatives of the victims and with emergency personnel who responded to the Sandy Hook Elementary School shooting.
- December 19 – President Obama is selected as Time magazine's Person of the Year.
- December 30 – President Obama signs into law a five-year extension of the Foreign Intelligence Surveillance Act.

== See also ==
- Timeline of the Barack Obama presidency (2009–2017)

U.S. presidential administration timelines
Preceded by Obama presidency (2011)	Obama presidency (2012)	Succeeded by Obama presidency (2013)
