= Timeline of the Barack Obama presidency (2016–2017) =

The following is a timeline of the presidency of Barack Obama, from January 1, 2016 to January 20, 2017. For his time as president-elect, see the presidential transition of Barack Obama; for a detailed account of his first months in office, see first 100 days of Barack Obama's presidency; for a complete itinerary of his travels, see list of presidential trips made by Barack Obama.

== January 2016 ==
- January 5 – announces an executive order on gun control that would require purchased guns to undergo background checks.
- January 7 – participates in a town hall meeting regarding gun control entitled Guns in America at the George Mason University in Fairfax, Virginia, organized by CNN and moderated by Anderson Cooper.

State of the Union address (January 12, 2016) (1:01:01)
Barack Obama's January 12, 2016 State of the Union Address

State of the Union address (January 12, 2016) (audio)
Audio-only version

- January 12 – delivers his final State of the Union Address before a joint session of Congress.
- January 15 – holds a live interview with YouTube personalities Adande Thorne, Destin Sandlin and Ingrid Nilsen.
- January 16 – signs an executive order lifting some of the economic sanctions on Iran.
- January 17 – delivers a statement on the Iran nuclear deal framework and the release of four Iranian-American prisoners from Iran through prisoner exchange.
- January 19 − holds a bilateral meeting with Prime Minister Malcolm Turnbull of Australia discussing the military intervention against ISIL.
- January 20 – visits Detroit's auto show.
- January 27 – meets with Democratic presidential candidate Bernie Sanders in the Oval Office.

== February ==
- February 3 – visits a mosque in Baltimore, marking his first visit to a mosque in the United States.
- February 4 − holds a bilateral meeting and a press conference with President Juan Manuel Santos of Colombia, where Obama announced a $450 million plan to fund Plan Colombia.
- February 4 − honors the 2015 NBA champion, the Golden State Warriors, at the East Room of the White House.
- February 8 − holds a bilateral meeting with President Sergio Mattarella of Italy.
- February 9 – releases his final budget proposal for the fiscal year 2017.
- February 10 – addresses the Illinois General Assembly in the State Capital Building in Springfield, Il and spoke about political gridlock.
- February 13 – issues a statement on the passing of Supreme court Justice Antonin Scalia
- February 15–16 – hosts the first special U.S.-ASEAN Leaders Summit, participating with the leaders of the Association of Southeast Asian Nations at the Sunnylands estate in Rancho Mirage, California.
- February 18 – welcomes the Stanley Cup winning Chicago Blackhawks to the White House.
- February 23 – unveils his plan to close the Guantanamo Bay detention camp in Caimanera, Cuba.
- February 24 − holds a bilateral meeting with King Abdullah of Jordan to discuss ISIS, the Syrian war and refugees and the reducing of tensions in the Middle East.
- February 24 – signs H.R. 1428 – Judicial Redress Act of 2015 and H.R. 644 – Trade Facilitation and Trade Enforcement Act of 2015 into law.
- February 29 − awards a Medal of Honor to SEAL Team Six member Edward Byers for rescuing an American doctor from the Taliban in Afghanistan in December 2012.

== March ==
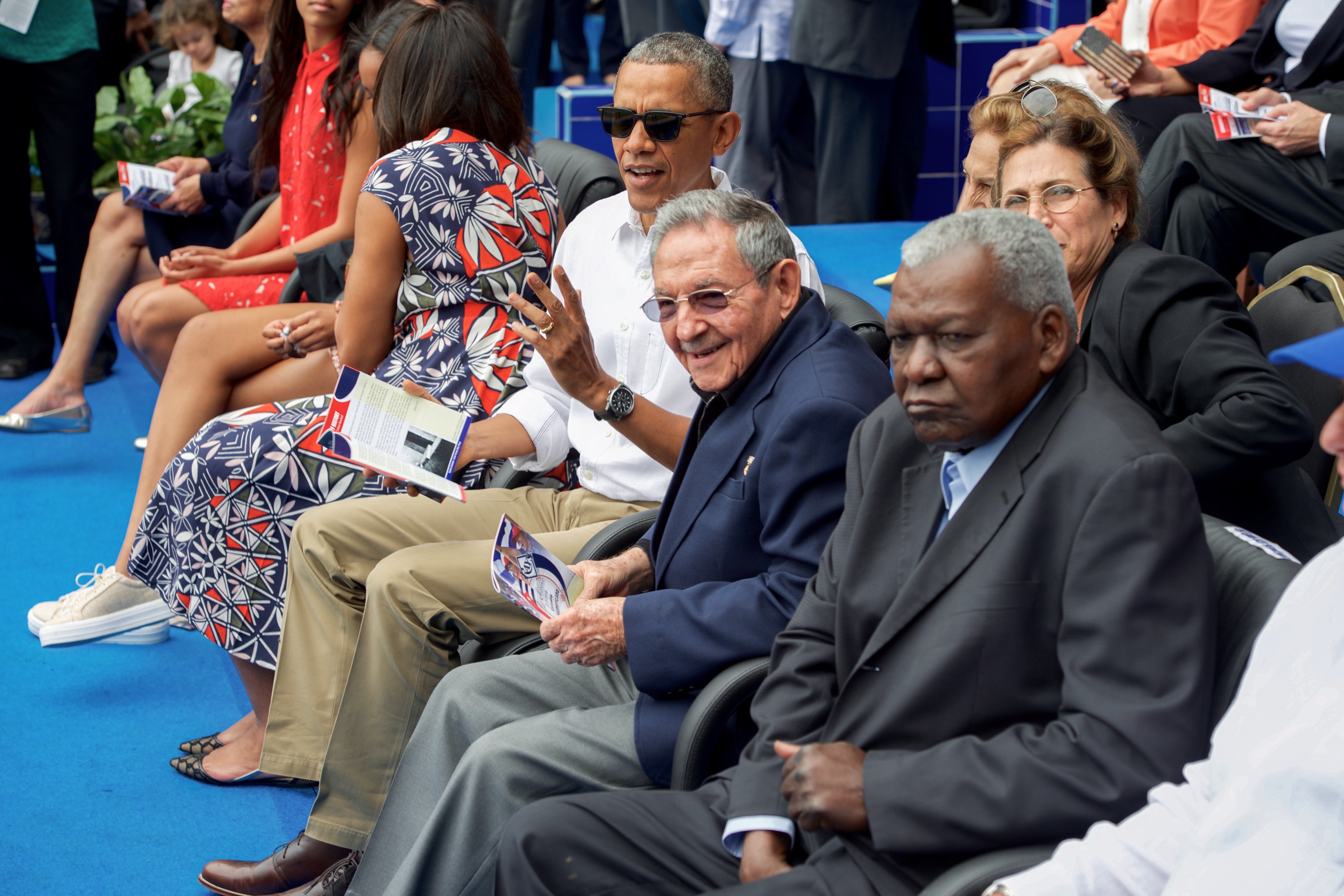
Obama views an exhibition baseball game with Cuban President Raúl Castro at Estadio Latinoamericano during Obama's historic visit to Havana, Cuba, March 22, 2016.

- March 10 – welcomes Canadian Prime Minister Justin Trudeau to the White House for a state visit.
- March 10 – The Obamas host a state dinner at the White House for Canadian Prime Minister Justin Trudeau.
- March 14 – invites the cast of the Broadway musical Hamilton to perform the musical at the White House.
- March 15 – holds a bilateral meeting with Taoiseach of Ireland, Enda Kenny.
- March 16 – announces Merrick Garland as his nomination to replace the late Antonin Scalia as an Associate Justice of the U.S. Supreme Court.
- March 20 – The President and the First Family travel to Havana, Cuba, to underscore the thaw in Cuba–United States relations following a 54-year rift; Obama is the first sitting U.S. president to visit the country since Calvin Coolidge in 1928.
- March 21 – holds a bilateral meeting and a joint press conference with President Raúl Castro of Cuba at the Palace of the Revolution in Havana.

President Obama and Mrs. Obama hosted at the White House a performance of musical selections by the cast of Hamilton on March 14, 2016.

- March 22 – addresses the Cuban people on national television from the Gran Teatro de La Habana in Havana, where he also delivered a statement on the Brussels bombings.
- March 22 – The Obamas and President Castro attend an exhibition baseball game between the Tampa Bay Rays and the Cuba national baseball team at Havana's Estadio Latinoamericano to highlight the two countries' cultural relations. The Rays won the game 4–1.
- March 23 – holds a bilateral meeting and a joint press conference with President Mauricio Macri of Argentina at Casa Rosada during a visit to Buenos Aires to discuss improving Argentina–United States relations, following tension in trade and investment between the two countries under Néstor and Cristina Fernández de Kirchner's administrations.
- March 31 – hosts the 2016 Nuclear Security Summit at the Walter E. Washington Convention Center in Washington, D.C., participating with 58 leaders and representatives from around the world to lay out a system of global security against nuclear warfare.
- March 31 – On the sidelines of the Nuclear Security Summit, Obama holds a trilateral meeting with Prime Minister Shinzō Abe of Japan and President Park Geun-hye of South Korea to discuss trilateral cooperation amid North Korea's nuclear program.
- March 31 – holds a bilateral meeting with President Xi Jinping of China to discuss "global nuclear security cooperation" amid North Korea's nuclear program, as well as "constructive" cooperation regarding the territorial disputes in the South China Sea.

== April ==
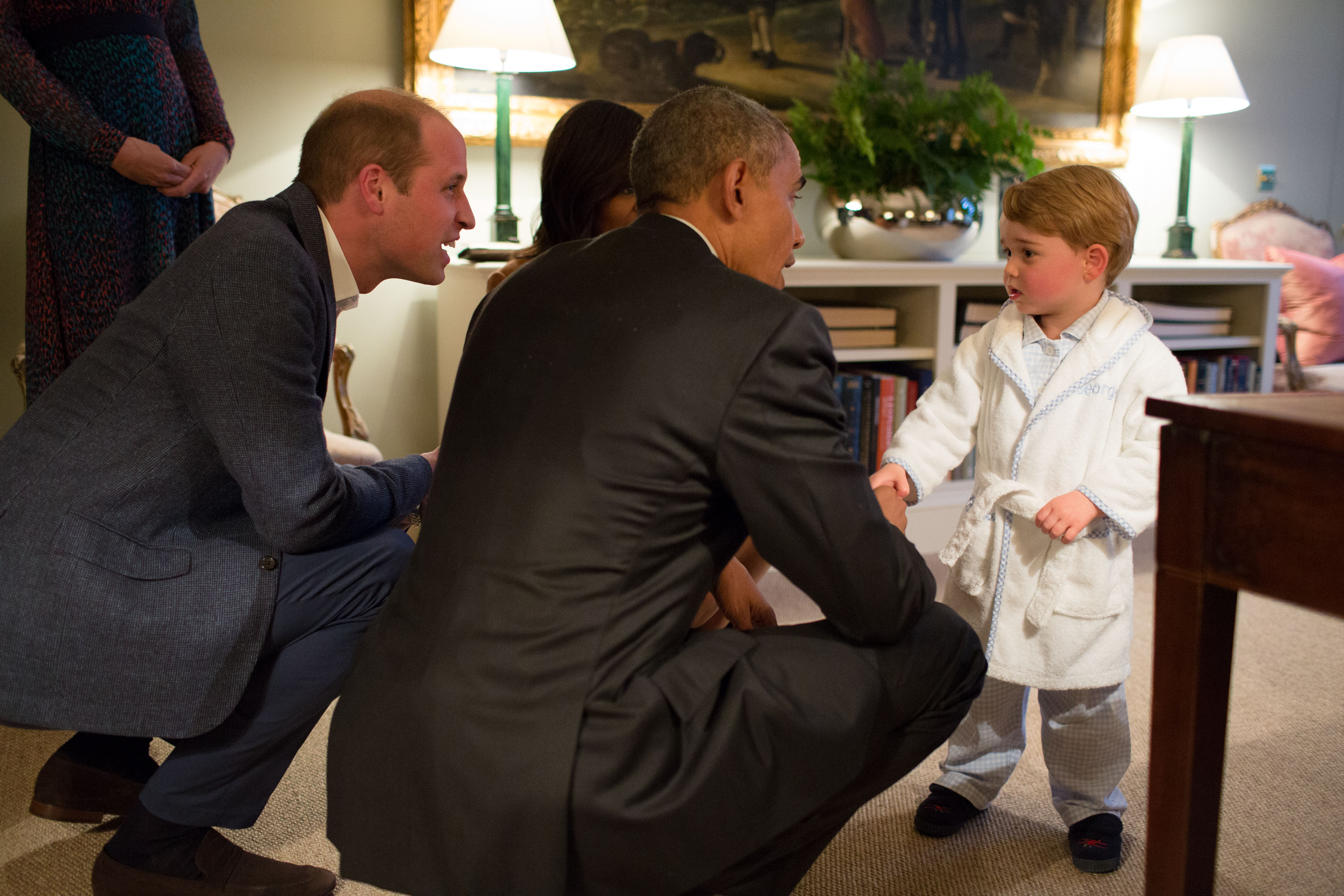
Obama greets Prince George of Cambridge, third in line to the British throne, at Kensington Palace during his visit to London, April 22, 2016.

- April 4 – meets with NATO Secretary General Anders Fogh Rasmussen to discuss the alliance's involvement in the military intervention against ISIL (particularly in Libya) and the War in Afghanistan, as well as the Syrian refugee crisis.
- April 14 - Obama and Vice President Biden meet with Prime Minister of Albania Edi Rama in the Oval Office.
- April 20 – holds a bilateral meeting with King Salman of Saudi Arabia in Riyadh to discuss joint action against the nuclear program of Iran and the Islamic State of Iraq and the Levant, the Syrian and Yemeni crises, as well as to resolve the issue of human rights.
- April 21 – participates in a summit meeting with the leaders of the Gulf Cooperation Council in Riyadh to discuss ways of addressing the Islamic State of Iraq and the Levant and other regional conflicts, including the Syrian and Yemeni crises.
- April 22 – The President and the First Lady attend a private lunch with Queen Elizabeth II and Prince Philip, Duke of Edinburgh at Windsor Castle in England to celebrate the Queen's 90th birthday.
- April 22 – participates in a joint press conference with British Prime Minister David Cameron at 10 Downing Street in London, reiterating their campaign for British voters to vote for the United Kingdom to remain in the European Union ahead of the referendum on June 23.
- April 22 – The President and the First Lady attend a dinner hosted by Prince William, Duke of Cambridge, Catherine, Duchess of Cambridge, and Prince Harry at Kensington Palace in London, where they also greet Prince George of Cambridge.
- April 23 – participates in a town hall meeting with the British youth at Lindley Hall in London, where he addressed questions regarding political issues like terrorism, trade, and the Northern Ireland peace process, as well as social issues and changes involving LGBT rights, racial inequality (touching on the Black Lives Matter movement), and discrimination towards non-binary gender persons.
- April 24 – During a joint press conference with German Chancellor Angela Merkel in Hanover, Germany, President Obama announces plans to increase U.S. military presence in Syria to at least 250 personnel to combat the Islamic State of Iraq and the Levant and assist local Syrian forces in doing so.
- April 25 – becomes the first sitting U.S. president to visit the Hannover Messe, the world's largest industrial fair, which he opened as the U.S. was the "partner country" of the fair.
- April 25 – and Chancellor Merkel participate in a multilateral meeting with other European leaders including British Prime Minister David Cameron, French President François Hollande, and Italian Prime Minister Matteo Renzi to discuss cooperation in resolving the Syrian and Libyan civil wars and the Russo-Ukrainian War.
- April 30 – attends his last White House Correspondents' Dinner.

== May ==
- May 4 – visits Flint, Michigan to address the city's water crisis.
- May 7 – delivers a commencement speech to the 2016 graduating batch of Howard University, urging them to change their country "through action."
- May 13 – hosts a multilateral meeting and state dinner at the State Dining Room of the White House for the leaders of the five Nordic countries: Prime Minister Lars Løkke Rasmussen of Denmark, President Sauli Niinistö of Finland, President Ólafur Ragnar Grímsson of Iceland, Prime Minister Erna Solberg of Norway, and Prime Minister Stefan Löfven of Sweden. The six leaders discussed humanitarian issues, combating climate change, and the Russo-Ukrainian War.
- May 15 – delivers a commencement speech entitled Ignorance is not a Virtue at Rutgers University's 250th anniversary commencement ceremony in New Brunswick, New Jersey.
- May 22 – arrives in Hanoi for a three-day visit to Vietnam aimed at building stronger economic and defense ties with the country and the Asia-Pacific region.
- May 23 – announces the full lifting of the 32-year arms embargo on Vietnam.
- May 25 – attends the 42nd G7 summit in Shima, Japan.
- May 26 – and Japanese Prime Minister Shinzō Abe visit one of Japan's holiest Shinto sites, the Ise Grand Shrine and plant trees.
- May 27 – becomes the first sitting U.S. president to visit the city of Hiroshima following the atomic bombings of Hiroshima and Nagasaki, where he pays his respects along with Prime Minister Abe and meets with survivors at the Hiroshima Peace Memorial Park, calling for the end of nuclear weapons.

== June ==
President Obama delivers a statement in Orlando, Florida after meeting with the families and victims of the nightclub shooting, June 16, 2016.

- June 2 − delivers a commencement speech to the graduating class of the United States Air Force Academy in Colorado, urging them to reject an "isolationist foreign policy."
- June 7 − holds a bilateral meeting with Prime Minister Narendra Modi of India.
- June 9 – meets with Vermont Senator Bernie Sanders and soon after endorses former Secretary of State Hillary Clinton for the presidency in the 2016 election.
- June 16 – travels to Orlando, Florida to meet with survivors and families of those victimized by the Orlando nightclub shooting, the second-deadliest mass shooting in U.S. history, which occurred four days prior.
- June 17–19 – visits the Carlsbad Caverns National Park in New Mexico and Yosemite National Park in California's Sierra Nevada mountains to highlight natural conservation, which coincides with the centennial celebrations of the National Park Service.
- June 24 – announces that the Stonewall Inn in New York City will be designated as the first National Monument dedicated to the LGBT history in the United States.
- June 24 – While delivering his speech at the Global Entrepreneurship Summit 2016 at Stanford University in Palo Alto, California, Obama comments on the United Kingdom's decision to withdraw from the European Union following the result of their nationwide referendum held on June 23, saying that the Special Relationship between the U.S. and the UK is "enduring", UK's membership in NATO is "a vital cornerstone of U.S. foreign, security, and economic policy", and the U.S.' relationship with both the UK and the EU will "remain indispensable".
- June 29 – participates in the North American Leaders' Summit in Ottawa, Ontario, Canada with Prime Minister Justin Trudeau of Canada and President Enrique Peña Nieto of Mexico.
- June 29 – addresses the Parliament of Canada in Ottawa to commit to Canada–United States relations.
- June 30 — signs the Puerto Rico Oversight, Management, and Economic Stability Act (PROMESA).

== July ==
- July 7–9 – participates in the 2016 NATO summit in Warsaw, Poland that focuses on strengthening defense cooperation to protect Eastern Europe from Russian aggression on Ukraine, confronting the Islamic State in Iraq and Syria, the European migrant crisis, and the United Kingdom withdrawal from the European Union. He also announces that around 1,000 extra troops will be deployed to Poland to bolster NATO's eastern flank.
- July 7 – In Warsaw, Obama comments on the American public reaction to the shooting of Alton Sterling in Baton Rouge, Louisiana and the shooting of Philando Castile in Minnesota, cases which have led to protests in the United States and allegations of racial injustice and profiling by police.
- July 8 – In Warsaw, Obama comments on the shooting of Dallas police officers in the aftermath of the fatal shootings of Sterling and Castile, the deadliest single incident in the history of U.S. law enforcement since the September 11, 2001 attacks He calls the event "a vicious, calculated and despicable attack on law enforcement," and orders all U.S. flags to be flown in half-staff for five days in honor of the five victims.
- July 22 – holds a bilateral meeting and a press conference with President Enrique Peña Nieto of Mexico.
- July 27 – is a keynote speaker at the Democratic National Convention in Philadelphia.

== August ==
- August 2 – welcomes Singaporean Prime Minister Lee Hsien Loong to the White House for a state visit; the Obamas host a state dinner at the White House for Singaporean Prime Minister Lee Hsien Loong.
- August 6 – begins his vacation of the island of Martha's Vineyard for the 6th and final time during his presidency.
- August 21 – and his family return to the White House after a 16-day vacation on the island of Martha's Vineyard off the coast of Massachusetts.
- August 23 – visits Baton Rouge to survey the damage and to comfort the victims of flood destruction in 20 Louisiana parishes.
- August 31 – leaves on his final trip to Asia as President. He visits Midway Atoll, China and Laos.

== September ==
- September 4 − participates in the 2016 G-20 Hangzhou summit in Hangzhou, China.
- September 6 − participates in the Eleventh East Asia Summit in Vientiane, Laos.
- September 19 – holds a bilateral meeting with Premier Li Keqiang of China.
- September 19 – holds a bilateral meeting with Prime Minister Malcolm Turnbull of Australia.
- September 20 – addresses the United Nations General Assembly.
- September 24 – dedicates the new Smithsonian National Museum of African American History and Culture on the National Mall in Washington D.C.
- September 28 – experiences the first veto override of his administration. In a bipartisan vote, both houses of Congress override Obama's veto of the Justice Against Sponsors of Terrorism Act. The legislation allows families of the victims of the September 11 attacks to sue Saudi Arabia for its alleged role in the attacks.
- September 30 – gave a eulogy at the funeral for former Israeli President and Prime Minister Shimon Peres.

== October ==
- October 18 – welcomes Italian Prime Minister Matteo Renzi to the White House for a state visit.
- October 18 – hosts a state dinner at the White House for Italian Prime Minister Matteo Renzi.

== November ==
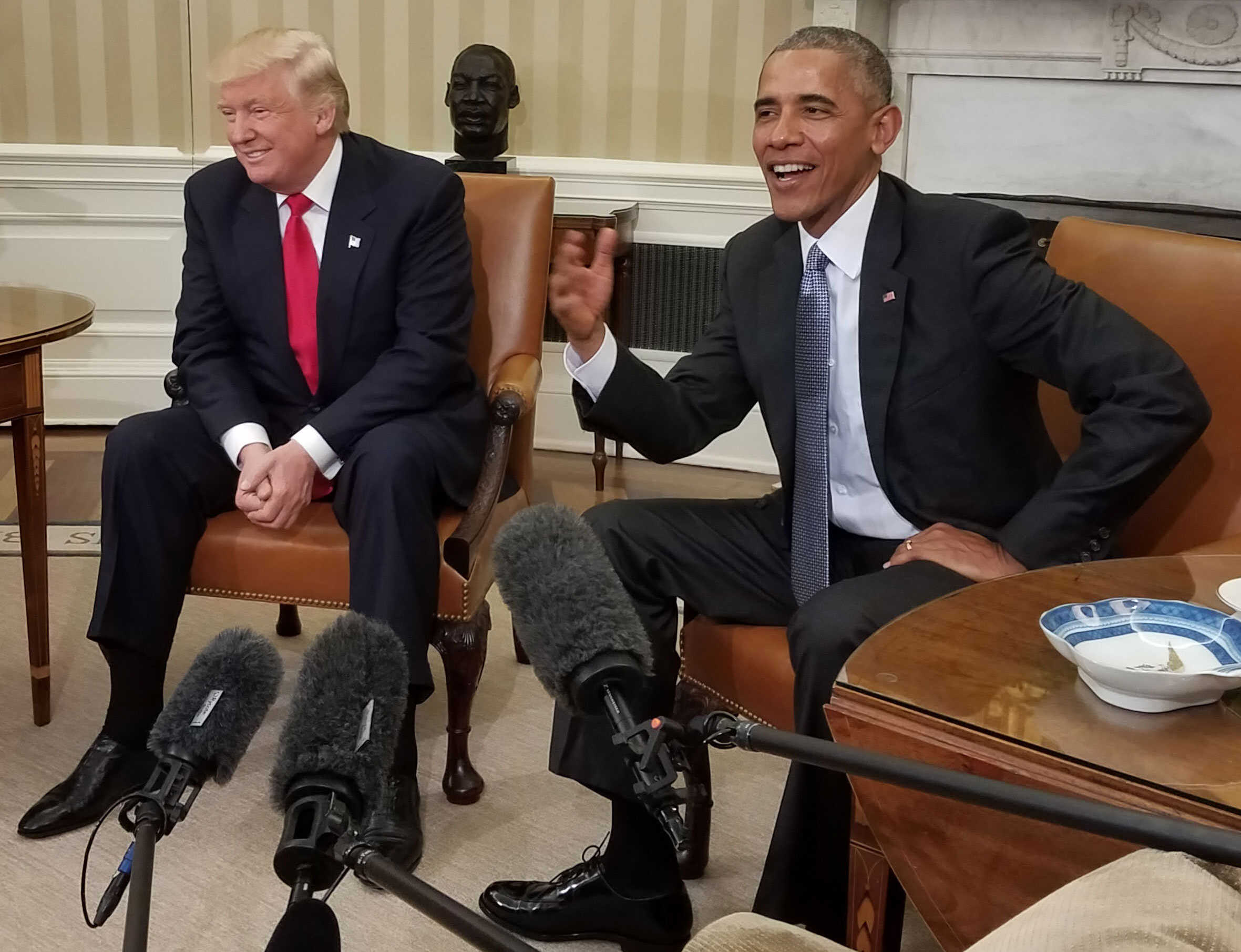
President Obama meets with President-elect Donald Trump at the Oval Office following the latter's victory in the 2016 presidential election, November 10, 2016.

- November 8 – The 2016 United States presidential election takes place. Republican Party nominee Donald Trump becomes president-elect after he had secured the projected total to 279 electoral votes, which he had reached over the required electoral votes of 270 to clinch victory. Democratic Party nominee Hillary Clinton concedes defeat and congratulates Trump on his victory.
- November 8 – The Republican Party narrowly retains majorities in the House of Representatives and the Senate after suffering important election losses.
- November 9 – calls President-elect Donald Trump in the early morning hours to congratulate him on his victory.
- November 9 – delivers his statement following the victory of Donald Trump in the 2016 presidential election.
- November 10 – meets with President-elect Donald Trump in the Oval Office to discuss the transition of power between the presidents. President Obama states the meeting was "excellent," and President-elect Trump says the meeting was supposed to last around 10–15 minutes, but went on to be around 90 minutes.
- November 14 – holds his first news conference since the election of Donald Trump and encourages Americans to give him some time to get adjusted to the responsibilities of the position as President.
- November 15 – travels to Athens, Greece, the first stop on his final international trip as president.
- November 16 – tours the Acropolis of Athens and the Parthenon, on the second day of his official visit to Greece.
- November 20 – attends the APEC economic summit in Lima, Peru.
- November 26 – releases a statement on the death of Fidel Castro saying in part, "History will record and judge the enormous impact of this singular figure on the people and world around him. "

== December ==
- December 2 – holds a bilateral meeting with Secretary-General-designate António Guterres of the United Nations.
- December 6 – gives his last national security speech at MacDill Air Force Base in Florida. In the speech, the President says that the danger of terrorism is a long-term issue, saying "the threat will endure".
- December 7 – notes the 75th anniversary of the World War II Pearl Harbor Attack.
- December 14 – signs the 21st Century Cures Act, a bipartisan bill to expand funding for medical research.
- December 15 – signs the Better Online Ticket Sales (BOTS) Act of 2016, which makes it illegal to use a bot to purchase tickets online.
- December 16 – holds his final press conference of 2016.
- December 16 – and his family travel to Hawaii on Air Force One for their annual holiday vacation.
- December 23 – signs into law the annual defense spending bill which would increase military pay and require all new recruits to be issued athletic shoes made in the United States.
- December 27 – visits the USS Arizona Memorial with Japanese Prime Minister Shinzō Abe to honor the 2,403 Americans who died on December 7, 1941.
- December 31 – Withdrawal of the majority of U.S. troops from Afghanistan after 15 years of war.

== January 2017 ==
- January 2 – returns to the White House after his annual Hawaiian vacation.
- January 3 – The 115th United States Congress convenes with the Republican Party retaining their majorities in the House of Representatives and the Senate.
- January 3 – Paul Ryan is re-elected as Speaker of the United States House of Representatives.
- January 4 – visits Democratic lawmakers on Capitol Hill with a message to save the Patient Protection and Affordable Care Act, as Republicans prepare to repeal and replace the regulatory overhaul of the U.S. healthcare system. Obama gives his farewell address to the armed forces at Joint Base Myer–Henderson Hall in Arlington, Virginia.
- January 6 – In a joint session of the United States Congress, the results for the electoral college are counted. In his role as President of the Senate, Vice President Joe Biden reads the results and declares President-elect Donald Trump as the winner of the 2016 presidential election. President Obama hosts a farewell party at the White House with a guest list reportedly including Sarah Jessica Parker, Tyler Perry, Chrissy Teigen, Samuel L. Jackson, Charles Barkley, John Legend, Meryl Streep, George and Amal Clooney, Robert De Niro, Beyoncé and Jay Z, Nick Jonas, Jordin Sparks, David Letterman, Paul McCartney, Kelly Rowland, Olivia Wilde, Jason Sudeikis, Magic Johnson, Tom Hanks, Reverend Al Sharpton, Jerry Seinfeld, Stevie Wonder, Steven Spielberg, and Marc Anthony.
- January 10 – delivers his farewell speech at McCormick Place in his hometown of Chicago.

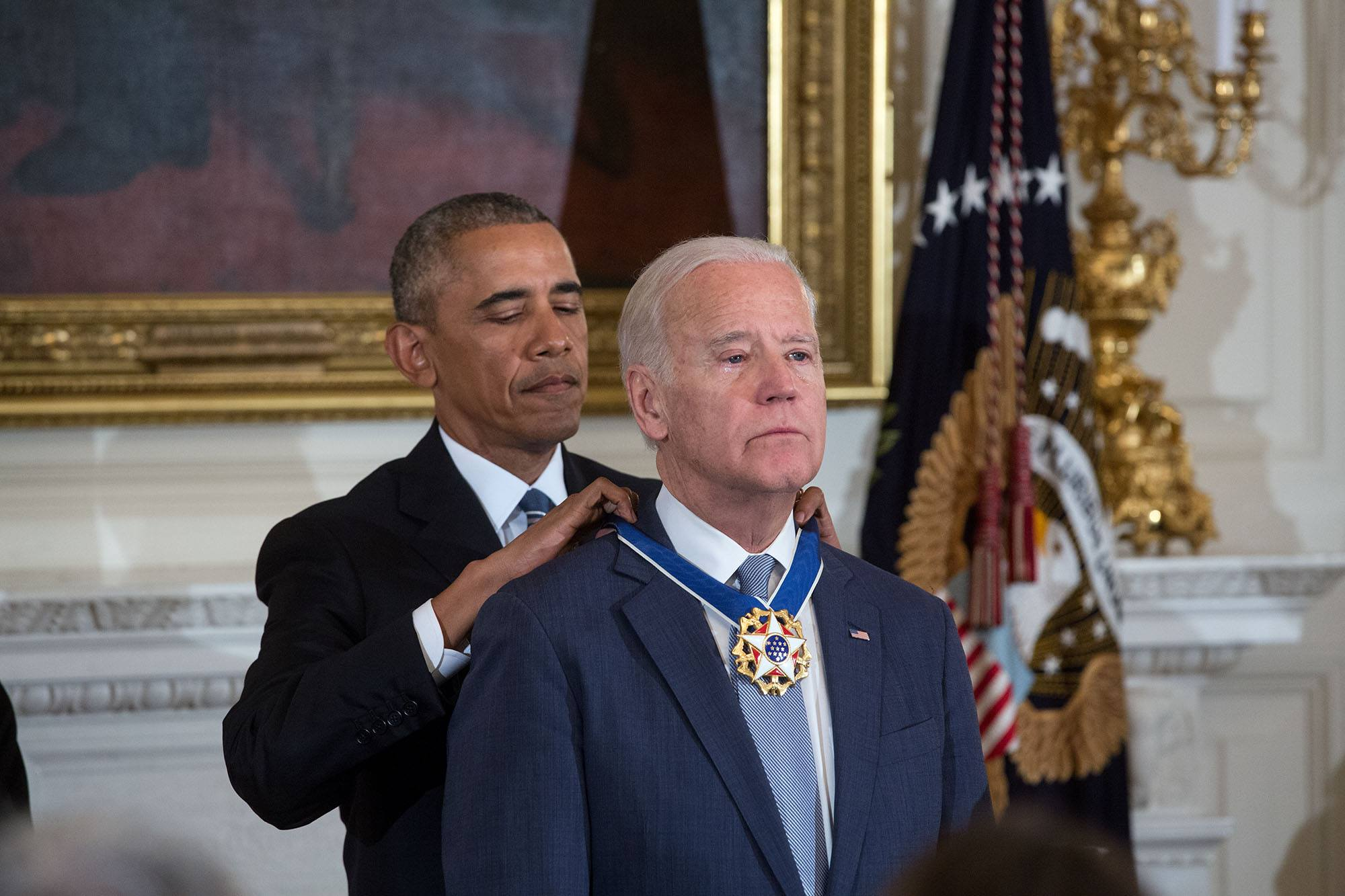
Vice President Joe Biden receives the Presidential Medal of Freedom.

- January 12 – signs an executive order which ends the exemption for Cubans who arrive in the United States without visas. Obama presents Vice President Joe Biden with the Presidential Medal of Freedom.
- January 16 – welcomes the 2016 World Series champion Chicago Cubs to the White House.
- January 17 – makes a surprise appearance at the final press briefing given by White House Press Secretary Josh Earnest, praising Earnest for his two and a half years' service. He also issues a pardon to General James Cartwright, involving a case in which Cartwright gave information to reporters regarding the Stuxnet virus used against the Iranian nuclear program. Obama commutes the sentence of Chelsea Manning, who was convicted of giving classified information to WikiLeaks.
- January 18 – holds the final press conference of his presidency, at the White House's James S. Brady Press Briefing Room.
- January 19 – commutes the sentences of 330 nonviolent drug offenders, the most acts of clemency ever granted in a single day by any U.S. president.
- January 20 – receives and greets President-elect Donald Trump, who arrived at the White House, for the formal transition of power in the United States. He is accompanied by First Lady Michelle Obama.
- January 20 – Vice President Joe Biden receives and greets Vice President-elect Mike Pence, who arrived at the White House. During the ceremony, he is accompanied by the second lady Jill Biden.
- January 20 – completes his two terms in office and leaves the White House for the final time as Commander-in-chief.
- January 20 – Donald Trump is inaugurated as the 45th president of the United States, at noon EST.
- January 20 – After the inauguration, Obama, now the former president, leaves for a vacation in Palm Springs, California to begin his post-presidency.

== See also ==
- Timeline of the Barack Obama presidency (2009–2017)

U.S. presidential administration timelines
Preceded by Obama presidency (2015)	Obama presidency (2016–2017)	Succeeded by First Trump presidency (2017 Q1)
