= Timeline of the Barack Obama presidency (2014) =

The following is a timeline of the presidency of Barack Obama, from January 1, 2014 to December 31, 2014. For his time as president-elect, see the presidential transition of Barack Obama; for a detailed account of his first months in office, see first 100 days of the Obama presidency; for a complete itinerary of his travels, see list of presidential trips made by Barack Obama.

== January ==
- January 7 – President Obama delivers remarks on Emergency Unemployment Insurance.
- January 7 – President Obama signs a $1.1 trillion spending bill, H.R. 3547, to finance the U.S. government through Sept 30, 2014.
- January 14 – President Obama announces a sprawling reform that would begin the process of change in the National Security Agency.
- January 14 – The President honors the 2013 NBA Champions Miami Heat.
- January 17 – President Obama delivers a speech at the Department of Justice in Washington, DC, to announce the outcomes of a review of our intelligence programs and phone surveillance.

State of the Union address (January 28, 2014) (1:05:18)
Barack Obama's January 28, 2014 State of the Union Address

State of the Union address (January 28, 2014) (audio)
Audio-only version

- January 28 – President Obama delivers his annual State of the Union Address before a joint session of Congress.
- January 28 – During the State of the Union Address, the President announces his retirement savings account initiative called myRA.

== February ==
- February 6 – The President and First Lady attend the annual National Prayer Breakfast.
- February 6 – President Obama meets with President Michel Martelly of Haiti.
- February 7 – H.R. 2642, the Agriculture Act of 2014, is signed into law by President Obama in a ceremony at Michigan State University.
- February 10 – President Obama visits Monticello with French President François Hollande as part of the latter's state visit to the United States.
- February 11 – The Obamas host a state dinner at the White House for French President François Hollande.
- February 12 – President Obama signs an executive order to raise the minimum wage for federal contractors.
- February 14 – The President meets with farmers and local officials in Fresno, California, before meeting with King Abdullah II of Jordan at Sunnylands.
- February 21 – President Obama meets with the Dalai Lama at the White House.
- February 21 – President Obama and Russian President Vladimir Putin hold an hour-long telephone conversation regarding the Ukrainian revolution among other topics.
- February 25 – President Obama meets with House Speaker John Boehner in a private conversation in the Oval Office.

== March ==
- March 1 – President Obama speaks by telephone with Russian President Vladimir Putin about Russia's military movements in Ukraine.
- March 3 – President Obama holds a bilateral meeting with Prime Minister Benjamin Netanyahu of Israel.
- March 4 – President Obama unveils his proposed 2015 budget and speaks about the ongoing situation in Ukraine.
- March 5 – The President delivers a speech at Central Connecticut State University calling on Congress to raise the federal minimum wage.
- March 6 – The President announces financial sanctions against "'individuals and entities' responsible for the Russian intervention in Crimea or for 'stealing the assets of the Ukrainian people.'" He also condemns the scheduled Crimean referendum on joining Russia and speaks with Russian President Vladimir Putin by telephone.
- March 12 – President Obama holds a bilateral meeting with Prime Minister Arseniy Yatsenyuk of Ukraine.
  Jose Rodela receiving the Medal of Honor from President Obama, March 18, 2014
- March 18 – President Obama awards the Medal of Honor to 24 minority U.S. Army veterans, the single largest group of Medal of Honor recipients since World War II.
- March 24–25 – President Obama attends the 2014 Nuclear Security Summit in the Netherlands.
- March 25 – President Obama speaks at a news conference with Dutch Prime Minister Mark Rutte.
- March 26 – President Obama calls for a recommitment to peace during a solemn pilgrimage to Flanders Field American Cemetery and Memorial in northwest Belgium.
- March 26 – President Obama holds a tri-lateral meeting with President Park Geun-hye of the South Korea and Prime Minister Shinzō Abe of Japan.
- March 27 – The President meets with Pope Francis in the Vatican and visits the ancient Roman Colosseum.
- March 28 – President Obama arrives in Riyadh, Saudi Arabia, for a brief visit to the kingdom.
- March 28 – Russian President Vladimir Putin telephones President Obama to discuss a proposed diplomatic solution to the ongoing Crimea/Ukraine situation.

== April ==
- April 1 – The President honors the 2013 World Series Champion Boston Red Sox at the White House.
- April 3 – The Gabriella Miller Kids First Research Act, H.R. 2019, is signed into law by President Obama.
- April 4 – President Obama holds a bilateral meeting with Prime Minister Mehdi Jomaa of Tunisia.
- April 11 – President Obama nominates Sylvia Mathews Burwell to replace Kathleen Sebelius as Secretary of Health and Human Services following the latter's resignation.
- April 22 – President Obama tours damage from the Oso mudslide near Arlington, Washington and meets with local residents and rescuers.
- April 24 – President Barack Obama and Japan's Empress Michiko attend a welcome ceremony at the Imperial Palace in Tokyo. Later, President Obama speaks at a joint press conference with Japanese Prime Minister Shinzō Abe at the Akasaka State Guest House on the subject of Russian sanctions.
- April 25 − President Obama holds a bilateral meeting with President Geun-hye Park of the Republic of South Korea in Seoul, Republic of Korea.
- April 28 − President Obama participates in an expanded bilateral meeting and a joint press conference with President Benigno Aquino of the Philippines in Manila, Philippines.

== May ==
- May 1 − The President honors the 2014 National Teacher of the Year and finalists.
- May 2 – President Obama holds a bilateral meeting, a press conference, and a private working lunch with Chancellor Angela Merkel of Germany.
- May 3 – President Obama attends the annual White House Correspondents' Dinner.
- May 5 – President Obama holds a bilateral meeting with President Ismail Omar Guelleh of Djibouti.
- May 12 − President Obama holds a bilateral meeting with President Jose Mujica Cordano of Uruguay. Later that day, the President honors the 2014 National Association of Police Organizations (NAPO) TOP COPS award winners.
- May 13 − The President awards Kyle J. White the Medal of Honor. A former active-duty Army Sergeant, White received the medal for his courageous actions during combat operations in Nuristan Province, Afghanistan on November 9, 2007.
- May 23 − H.R. 1209 awarding a Congressional Gold Medal to the World War II members of the Doolittle Tokyo Raiders and H.R. 685, American Fighter Aces Congressional Gold Medal Act are signed into law by the President.
- May 25 – President Obama makes an unannounced trip to Afghanistan where he visits troops and military leaders at Bagram Airfield.
- May 28 – The President delivers the commencement address at the United States Military Academy (West Point).

== June ==
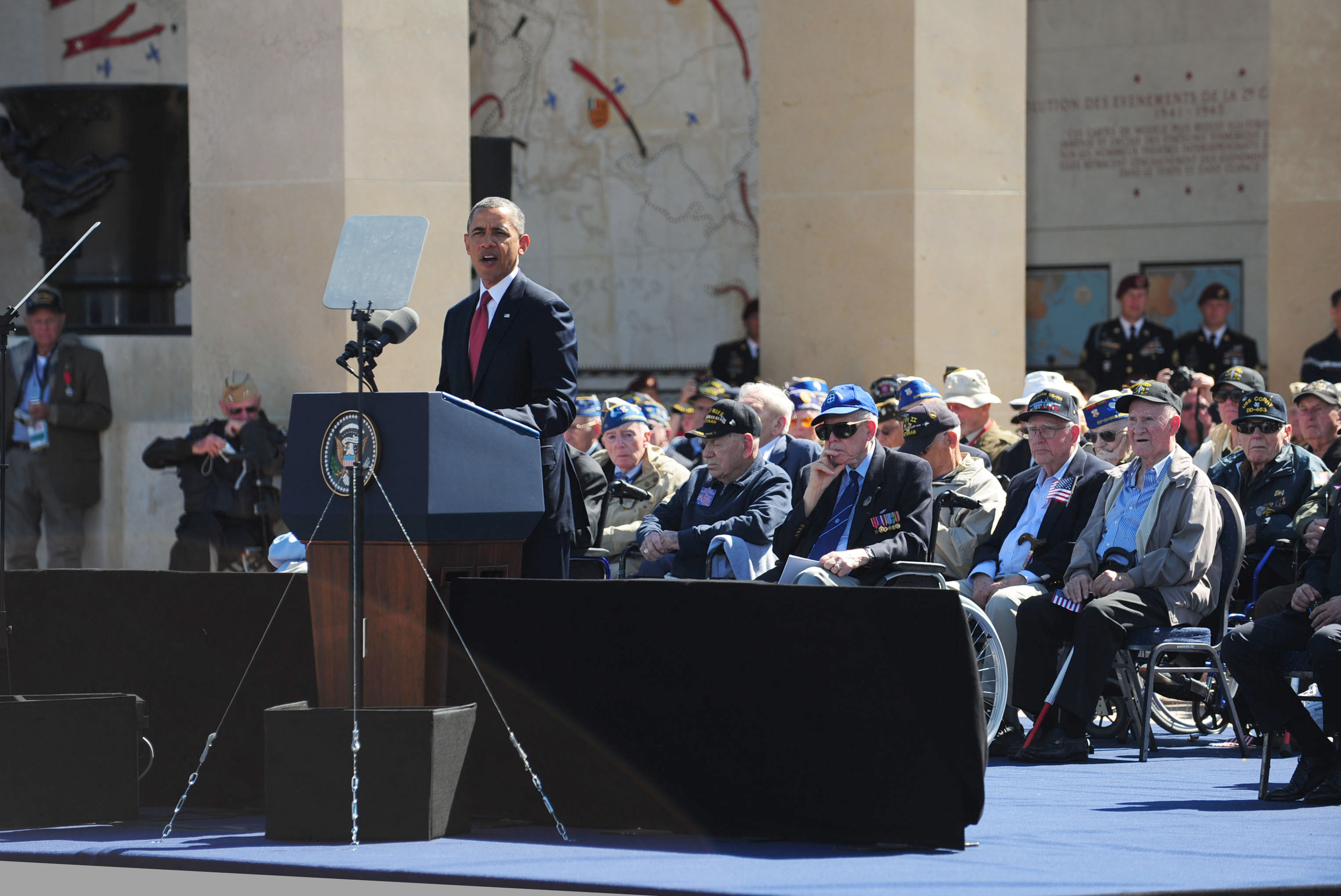
President Obama speaks to approximately 10,000 attendees at the Normandy American Cemetery, June 6, 2014

- June 3 – The President participates in a bilateral meeting with Polish President Bronislaw Komorowski and in a separate bilateral meeting with Polish Prime Minister Donald Tusk while in Poland at a meeting with Central and Eastern European Leaders.
- June 4 – President Obama holds a bilateral meeting with President-elect Petro Poroshenko of Ukraine.
- June 5 – The President participates in a bilateral meeting with Prime Minister David Cameron of the United Kingdom while attending a Brussels G7 meeting on the global economy.
- June 6 – President Obama joins other world leaders in France to commemorate the 70th anniversary of the Battle of Normandy.
- June 10 – The Water Resources Reform and Development Act of 2013, H.R. 3080, is signed into law by President Obama.
- June 12 – President Obama holds a bilateral meeting with Prime Minister Tony Abbott of Australia.
- June 14 – The President delivers the commencement address at the University of California, Irvine.
- June 19 – The President awards Corporal William "Kyle" Carpenter, U.S. Marine Corps (Ret.), the Medal of Honor.
- June 20 – President Obama holds a bilateral meeting with Prime Minister John Key of New Zealand.
- June 23 – The President and Vice President participate in a roundtable discussion at the White House Summit on Working Families.
- June 25 – President Obama holds a bilateral meeting with President Shimon Peres of Israel.
- June 30 – President Obama holds a bilateral meeting with President Michelle Bachelet of Chile.

== July ==
- July 8 – The President meets with NATO Secretary General Anders Fogh Rasmussen to discuss the Russo-Ukrainian war.
- July 16 − President Obama meets with members of the Congressional Hispanic Caucus.
- July 21 – President Obama signs an Executive Order to protect LGBT employees from workplace discrimination.
- July 21 – The President awards the Medal of Honor to Staff Sergeant Ryan M. Pitts (US Army).
- July 22 – The Workforce Innovation and Opportunity Act, H.R. 803, is signed into law by President Obama.
- July 25 – President Obama meets with President Molina of Guatemala, President Hernandez of Honduras and President Cerén of El Salvador.
- July 28 − The President awards the 2013 National Medal of Arts and the National Humanities Medal.
- July 29 − President Obama visits the Walter Reed National Military Medical Center in Bethesda, Maryland and speaks to wounded service members.
- July 31 − President Obama signs an Executive Order titled "Fair Pay and Safe Workplaces" ensuring all Americans get fair pay and safe workplaces. Federal agencies will be given more guidance on how to consider labor violations when awarding federal contracts.

== August ==
- August 3 − S. 517, Unlocking Consumer Choice and Wireless Competition Act, is signed into law by President Obama.
- August 5–6 – The President addresses and participates in three sessions of the United States–Africa Leaders Summit.
- August 7 – The President signs H.R. 3230, the Veterans' Access to Care through Choice, Accountability, and Transparency Act of 2014 in Fort Belvoir, Virginia. President Obama announces the authorization of targeted airstrikes against the Islamic State near Erbil, Iraq.
- August 15 − The President meets with members of the National Security Council to receive an update on Iraq. Following the meeting, the President delivers a statement regarding Iraq and the situation in Ferguson, Missouri.
- August 28 - The president wears a tan suit attracting significant media and social media criticism. The event later became a metaphor for the stability of Obama's presidency compared to the following presidency of Donald Trump.

== September ==
- September 4–5 – President Obama and more than 60 other world leaders attend a NATO summit in Newport, Wales to discuss Afghanistan. The President holds a bilateral meeting with President Recep Tayyip Erdogan of Turkey. The President visits Stonehenge.
- September 10 – The President delivers a speech outlining his plan to fight the Islamic State.
- September 11 − The President and First Lady attend the September 11th Observance Ceremony at the Pentagon Memorial.
- September 15 − President Obama awards Army Command Sergeant Major Bennie G. Adkins and Army Specialist Four Donald P. Sloat, the Medal of Honor.
- September 18 – President Obama holds a bilateral meeting with President Petro Poroshenko of Ukraine.
- September 19 − H.J.Res. 124 the Continuing Appropriations Resolution of 2015 is signed into law by President Obama.
- September 24 – President Obama addresses the United Nations General Assembly. Afterward, the President holds a bilateral meeting with Prime Minister Haider al-Abadi of the Republic of Iraq. Later in the day, the President meets with Secretary-General Ban Ki-moon of the United Nations and President Sam Kutesa of the United Nations.
- September 25 − President Obama holds a bilateral meeting with Prime Minister Hailemariam Desalegn of Ethiopia.
- September 25 − President Obama holds a bilateral meeting with President Abdel Fattah el-Sisi of Egypt.
- September 30 – President Obama holds a bilateral meeting with Prime Minister Narendra Modi of India.

== October ==
- October 1 – President Obama holds a bilateral meeting with Prime Minister Benjamin Netanyahu of Israel.
- October 8 − The President meets with Military Senior Leadership at The Pentagon.
- October 14 − President Obama attends a meeting at Andrews Air Force Base hosted by Chairman of the Joint Chiefs of Staff Gen. Martin E. Dempsey with more than 20 foreign chiefs of defense to discuss the coalition efforts in the ongoing campaign against ISIL. Gen. Lloyd Austin, commander U.S. Central Command also participates.
- October 15 – The President participates in a video conference with British, French, German and Italian counterparts to discuss the international response to the Ebola epidemic in West Africa, efforts to combat ISIL, and international efforts to encourage Russia to fulfill its obligations under the Minsk agreements.
- October 17 − The President and the Vice President meet with members of the National Security Council to discuss coordinating the whole-of-government response to Ebola.
- October 22 − Obama holds a meeting with Ebola Response Coordinator Ron Klain to coordinate the government's Ebola response.
- October 23 − The President meets with members of The President's Council of Advisors on Science and Technology (PCAST).

== November ==
- November 4 − President Obama meets with Christine Lagarde, the Managing Director of the International Monetary Fund.
- November 5 – The President accepts blame for the mid-term rout of Democratic candidates.
- November 6 – President Obama awards the Medal of Honor posthumously to Union Army First Lieutenant Alonzo H. Cushing for conspicuous gallantry during the American Civil War.
- November 7 – President Obama announces he will send 1,500 troops to Iraq to train Iraqi and Kurdish forces to fight ISIS.
- November 8 – Obama nominates Loretta Lynch for Office of Attorney General.
- November 10 − President Obama departs to Beijing on a trip to Asia and Australia, Upon arrival in Beijing, China, the President holds a bilateral meeting with President Joko Widodo of Indonesia. In the afternoon, the President participates in a meeting with leaders of the Trans-Pacific Partnership countries and, afterward, meets with employees and family members of the United States Embassy to China. Later, the President holds a bilateral meeting with Prime Minister Tony Abbott of Australia.
- November 11 − President Obama begin his bilateral program with President Xi of China which includes a walk and talk, a bilateral meeting and a private dinner.
- November 11 – The US and China announced an agreement on fighting global warming.
- November 13 − The President participates in a US–ASEAN session in Naypyitaw, Burma. Later that day, the President attends a bilateral meeting with Prime Minister Nguyen Tan Dung of Vietnam. That evening, the President holds a bilateral meeting with President Thein Sein of Burma.
- November 14 − President Obama participates in the 2014 G20 Brisbane summit in Brisbane, Australia.
- November 19 − The Child Care and Development Block Grant Act of 2014, S. 1086, is signed into law by President Obama.
- November 20 – The President honors nineteen recipients of the National Medal of Science and National Medal of Technology and Innovation, the nation's highest honors for achievement and leadership in advancing the fields of science and technology. Later that day, President Obama announces that millions of illegal immigrants in the US will gain protections from deportation.
- November 24 − The President presents nineteen recipients with the Presidential Medal of Freedom, the nation's highest civilian honor.

== December ==
- December 2 – President Obama meets with a dozen tribal leaders in Washington DC in advance of the White House Tribal Nations Conference to be held the following day.
- December 5 – The President meets with newly elected State governors to discuss the economy.
- December 5 – President Obama holds a bilateral meeting with King Abdullah of Jordan.
- December 8 – Prince William, Duke of Cambridge meets with President Obama in the White House.
- December 12 – President Obama meets with the Saudi Interior Minister Prince Mohammed bin Nayef bin Abdalaziz Al Saud.
- December 16 − The President meets with Archbishop Joseph Kurtz of Louisville, President of the U.S. Conference of Catholic Bishops. Later that day, the President meets with members of the National Security Council.
- December 17 – President Obama announces U.S. to restore full relations with Cuba.
- December 19 – President Obama holds his final press conference of 2014.

== See also ==
- Timeline of the Barack Obama presidency (2009–2017)

U.S. presidential administration timelines
Preceded by Obama presidency (2013)	Obama presidency (2014)	Succeeded by Obama presidency (2015)
