= Timeline of the Barack Obama presidency (2010) =

Obama presidency events in 2010

The following is a timeline of the presidency of Barack Obama, from January 1, 2010, to December 31, 2010. For his time as president-elect, see the presidential transition of Barack Obama; for a detailed account of his first months in office, see first 100 days of Barack Obama's presidency; for a complete itinerary of his travels, see list of presidential trips made by Barack Obama.

== January ==
January 25, 2010 White House Visit (8:49)
On January 25, 2010, Barack Obama hosted the 2008–09 Los Angeles Lakers at the White House following their victory in the 2009 NBA Finals to end the 2008–09 NBA season.

State of the Union address (January 27, 2010) (1:09:44)
Barack Obama's January 27, 2010 State of the Union Address

State of the Union address (January 27, 2010) (audio)
Audio-only version

- January 5 – President Obama holds a major security meeting in the wake of the attempted attack on Northwest Airlines Flight 253.
- January 7 – President Obama meets with former President Bill Clinton at the White House.
- January 13 – President Obama holds a press conference discussing the operations of US government organizations such as USAID and the Department of Defense in response to the 2010 Haiti earthquake.
- January 14 – President Obama commits US$100,000,000 to help Haiti recover from the 2010 earthquake, while calling on former American Presidents George W. Bush and Bill Clinton to assist.
- January 16 – Secretary of State Hillary Clinton and USAID Director Rajiv Shah travel to Haiti.
- January 17 – President Obama travels to Boston, Massachusetts to campaign for Martha Coakley in the Senate special election.
- January 18 – President Obama participates in community service activities to honor slain civil rights hero Martin Luther King Jr., while also visiting the American Red Cross headquarters and personally submitting his first Twitter update.
- January 21 – President Obama announces the "Volcker rule" and a host of other proposals for new banking regulation.
- January 22 – President Obama travels to Elyria, Ohio, visiting the Lorain County Community College and emphasizing his political agenda.
- January 25 – President Obama hosts the Los Angeles Lakers at the White House for winning the 2009 NBA Finals.
- January 27 – President Obama delivers his annual State of the Union Address before a joint session of Congress.
- January 28 – President Obama travels to MacDill Air Force Base in Tampa, Florida, where he met with crew helping with the humanitarian response to the 2010 Haiti earthquake, before holding a town hall meeting at the University of Tampa.
- January 30 – Former President George H. W. Bush makes a social call on President Obama at the White House.

== February ==
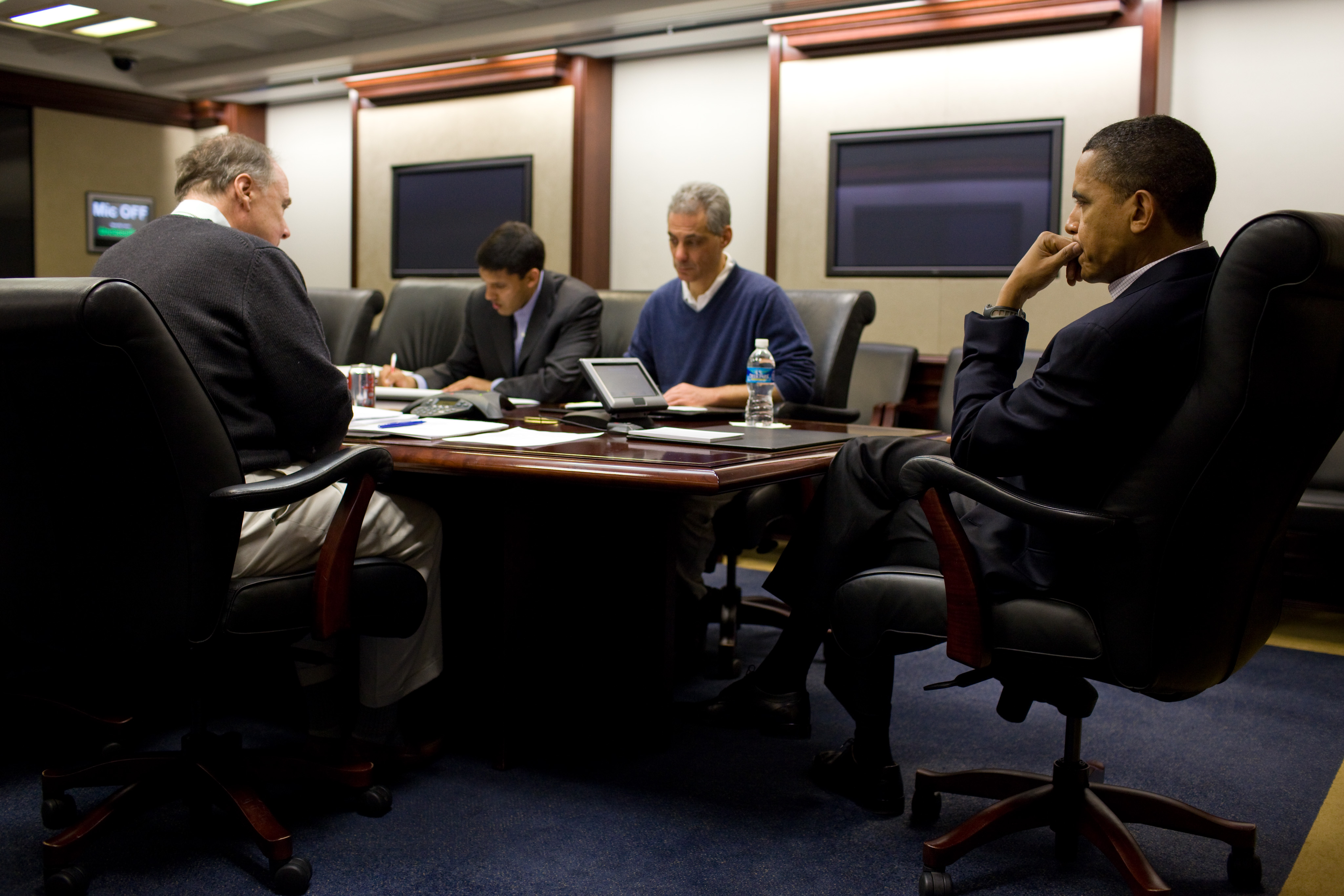
February 27: Obama is briefed on the earthquake in Chile.

- February 1 – President Obama announces his proposal for the fiscal year 2011 federal budget. President Obama answers questions submitted by the public in a live session moderated by Steve Grove of YouTube; the session is broadcast from the White House and on YouTube's CitizenTube channel.
- February 2 – President Obama travels to Nashua, New Hampshire, touring small businesses before giving a speech at Nashua North High School.
- February 3 – President Obama hosts a meeting of Governors in the State Dining Room. Afterwards, the President holds a Cabinet-level exercise in crisis-management in preparation for the 2010 Vancouver Olympics.
- February 6 – President Obama speaks at a gathering of the Democratic National Committee's Winter Meeting at the Capitol Hilton in Washington, D.C. The President's motorcade encounters trouble due to the blizzard that affected the region when a snow-laden tree branch fell on a vehicle carrying journalists as it returned to the White House; no one was injured.
- February 9 – The Obamas host a concert of music from the era of the Civil Rights Movement at the White House to celebrate Black History Month. The concert marks the beginning of the 2010 White House music series.
- February 10 – President Obama holds an "urban economy summit" in the Oval Office with African-American leaders including Al Sharpton, Benjamin Jealous, and Marc Morial.
- February 11 – President Obama meets with senior representatives from the March of Dimes charity, discussing the effects of preterm birth.
- February 16 – President Obama announces $8.3 billion in federal loan guarantees to help Southern Company build two new nuclear reactors in Burke County, Georgia. President Obama also nominates career diplomat and former United States Ambassador to Algeria Robert Ford to be the first United States Ambassador to Syria since 2005.
- February 18 – President Obama meets with the Dalai Lama in the Map Room at the White House.
- February 25 – President Obama delivers opening remarks at his bipartisan health care summit at Blair House. President Obama awards the National Medal of Arts and the National Humanities Medal to twenty recipients in a ceremony in the East Room of the White House.
- February 27 – The White House announces the naming of Julianna Smoot as Deputy Assistant to the President and Social Secretary; Smoot replaces Desirée Rogers.
- February 28 – President Obama travels to Bethesda, Maryland, for a routine medical examination at the National Naval Medical Center, where he later visits soldiers who were wounded in the Iraq War and the War in Afghanistan.

== March ==
- March 1 – Speaking at the United States Chamber of Commerce, President Obama announces that $900 million in grants would be given to under-performing schools in America upon acceptance of a reform model.
- March 2 – Promoting his energy-related jobs proposals, President Obama addresses the faculty and students at the Savannah Technical College in Savannah, Georgia.
- March 5 – President Obama travels to Arlington, Virginia, discussing his Administration's policy and the economic situation at the headquarters of OPOWER, a corporation producing efficient energy use technology.
- March 8 – President Obama discusses health care reform at Arcadia University in Glenside.
- March 10 – President Obama travels to St. Louis, Missouri, where he discusses his plans for health care reform.
- March 13 – While in Atlanta, Georgia, President Obama details his plans for the overhaul of the American education system.
- March 19 – President Obama speaks at George Mason University in Fairfax, Virginia, discussing his plans for major health care reform.
- March 20 – President Obama confers with the Democratic Caucus of the United States House of Representatives, urging members to vote in favor of administration health care reform proposals.

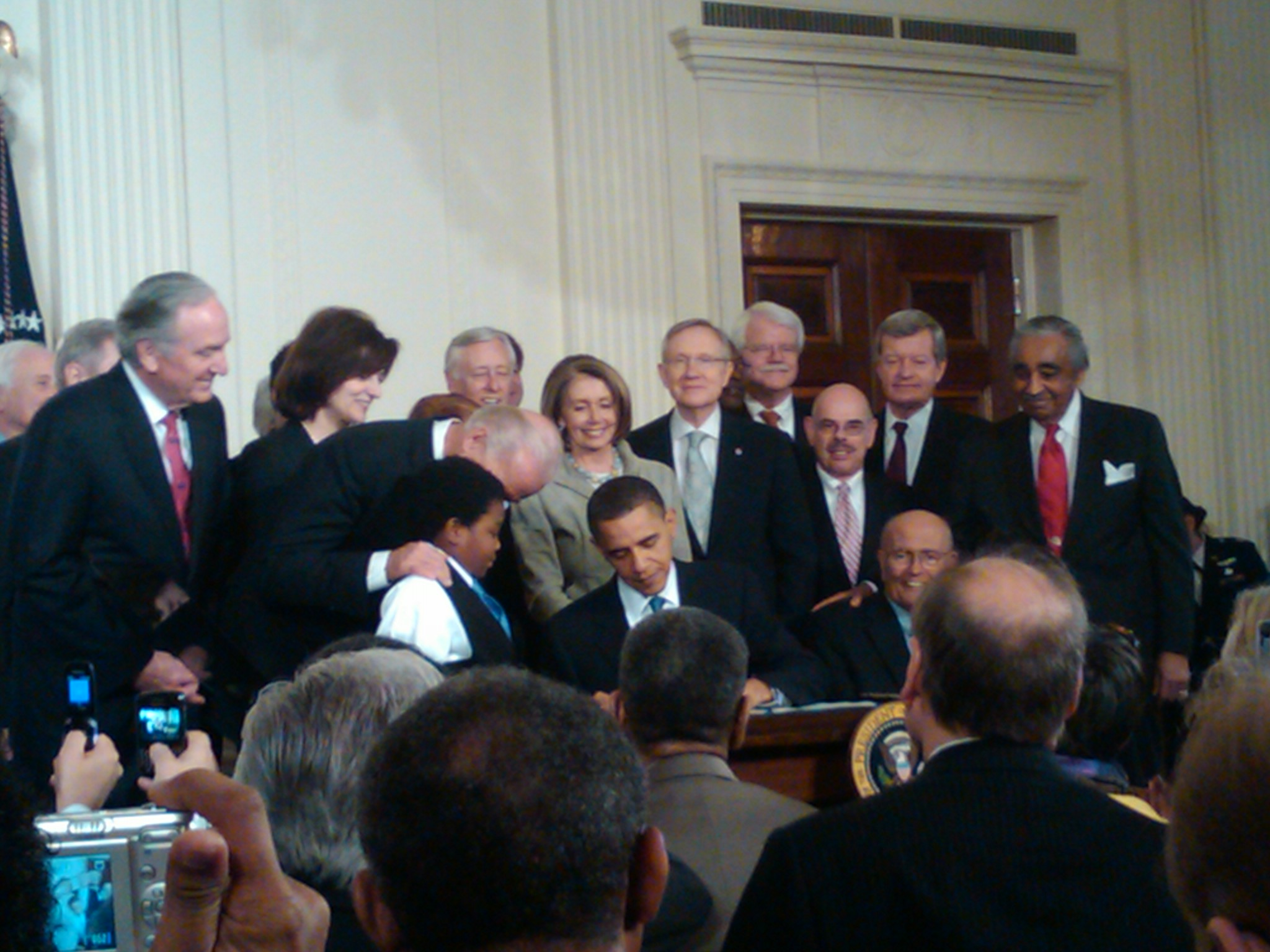
March 23: Obama signing the Patient Protection and Affordable Care Act at the White House.

- March 23 – The Patient Protection and Affordable Care Act is signed into law by the President. It is the first major health care reform law enacted in the history of the United States.
- March 25 – President Obama speaks at the University of Iowa in Iowa City, Iowa, where he defends the newly signed Patient Protection and Affordable Care Act.
- March 28 – President Obama makes an unannounced visit to Afghanistan where he meets with Afghan President Hamid Karzai.
- March 30 – President Obama signs the Health Care and Education Reconciliation Act of 2010 into law at a ceremony at the Alexandria campus of Northern Virginia Community College. President Obama hosts French President Nicolas Sarkozy and his wife, Carla Bruni-Sarkozy, at the White House.
- March 31 – Speaking at Joint Base Andrews Naval Air Facility, President Obama announces that he will approve oil and gas exploration in the eastern Gulf of Mexico and off the coast of Virginia, ending a moratorium on drilling off the East Coast of the United States.

== April ==
- April 1 – President Obama holds an hour-long phone conversation with Chinese President Hu Jintao, delaying Air Force One on the tarmac at Andrews Air Force Base for ten minutes after landing.
- April 4 – The Obama family celebrates Easter at Allen Chapel African Methodist Episcopal Church in Southeast, Washington, D.C., drawing attention to an area with high crime and unemployment rates.
- April 5 – The Obamas host thousands of families on the White House lawn for the annual White House Easter Egg Roll. President Obama throws the ceremonial first pitch at the Washington Nationals season opener against the Philadelphia Phillies at Nationals Park in Washington, D.C., marking the 100th year of the presidential tradition.
- April 8 – President Obama and Russian President Dmitry Medvedev sign the latest Strategic Arms Reduction Treaty (START), a "major" nuclear arms control agreement that reduces the nuclear weapons stockpiles of both countries.
- April 9 – President Obama and Czech President Václav Klaus hold a meeting at Prague Castle.
- April 10 – President Obama calls Polish Prime Minister Donald Tusk to express his condolences following the death of Polish President Lech Kaczyński and others in a plane crash.
- April 11 – President Obama holds talks at Blair House with heads of state from India, Kazakhstan, Pakistan, and South Africa on the eve of the Nuclear Security Summit that the President is hosting in Washington, D.C.
- April 12 – President Obama holds bilateral meetings with a number of heads of state—including a high-profile meeting with Chinese President Hu Jintao—and hosts a working dinner with foreign government delegations as part of the Nuclear Security Summit that he is hosting.
- April 13 – President Obama participates in the second and final day of the Nuclear Security Summit in Washington, D.C., proclaiming at the conclusion of the gathering that "real progress" was made toward the goal of securing nuclear material worldwide.
- April 15 – In a major space policy speech at Kennedy Space Center, President Obama outlines his proposal to add $6 billion to NASA's budget over the next five years with funding being used for deep space exploration rather than lunar exploration. In a memorandum to Secretary of Health and Human Services Kathleen Sebelius, President Obama orders the Department of Health and Human Services to write rules that would prohibit hospitals that receive funding from Medicare or Medicaid from denying visitation privileges on the basis of race, color, national origin, religion, sex, sexual orientation, gender identity, or disability.
- April 17 – Due to air travel disruption across Europe after the eruption of Iceland's Eyjafjallajökull volcano, the White House cancels plans for President Obama to attend the funeral of Polish President Lech Kaczyński.
- April 22 – Speaking at Cooper Union in Lower Manhattan, President Obama urges CEOs to back his financial reform proposal and to support regulatory legislation.
- April 23 – President Obama speaks at a naturalization ceremony for active-duty members of the U.S. military forces in the Rose Garden, strongly criticizing the newly passed Arizona SB1070 measure against illegal immigration, and calling for federal immigration reform.
- April 23–25 – President and Mrs. Obama are in Asheville, North Carolina for a weekend vacation.
- April 25 – President Obama meets briefly with Billy Graham at Graham's home in Montreat, North Carolina. President Obama and Vice President Biden travel to Beckley, West Virginia, where they meet with family members of miners killed in the Upper Big Branch Mine disaster; President Obama delivers a eulogy at a service for the 29 miners who died in the mine explosion.
- April 26 – President Obama welcomes the World Series Champion New York Yankees to the White House to honor their 2009 season. The President also speaks at the Presidential Summit on Entrepreneurship at the Ronald Reagan Building.
- April 27 – President Obama travels to Iowa and tours the Siemens Wind Turbine Blade Manufacturing Plant in Fort Madison, Iowa. There the President delivers remarks on how to grow the economy and put Americans back to work. The President also visits a local business in Mt. Pleasant, Iowa and holds a town hall meeting in Indian Hills Community College, Ottumwa, Iowa, spending the night in Des Moines
- April 28 – President Obama tours a POET Biorefining plant in Macon, Missouri and delivers remarks on rebuilding the economy. The President then tours a local farm and visits with the family that operates the farm in Palmyra, Missouri. Later that afternoon the President delivers remarks on the urgent need to pass Wall Street reform at the Oakley-Lindsay Civic Center in Quincy, Illinois.
- April 29 – President Obama, Vice President Biden, and the First Lady attend Dorothy Height's funeral at the National Cathedral. President Obama honors the 2010 National Teacher of the Year and the state teachers of the year from across the country at an event in the Rose Garden. Jill Biden and Secretary of Education Arne Duncan join him for the event. The President also attends a private DNC fundraising diner in Washington, D.C.
- April 30 – From the Rose Garden President Obama makes a statement on the first quarter 2010 GDP numbers. The President is joined by representatives and workers from two U.S. manufacturers, Itron, a Washington state based manufacturer of smart energy meters, and A123 Systems, a Massachusetts-based advanced battery manufacturer, that are expanding production and hiring as a result of the Recovery Act. The President also travels to the James J. Rowley Training Center in Beltsville, Maryland and observes the Secret Service's training procedures and demonstration activities.

== May ==
- May 1 – President Obama delivers the commencement address at the University of Michigan in Ann Arbor, Michigan. That evening the President and First Lady attend the White House Correspondents' Association Dinner, where he delivers remarks.
- May 2 – President Obama is in Venice, Louisiana where he remarks on the Times Square Car Bombing Attempt and the BP Oil-Spill.
- May 3 – President Obama speaks at the Commander-in-Chief's Trophy Presentation with the Naval Academy in the Rose Garden. The President also hosts a dinner for the Business Council in the State Dining Room.
- May 4 – President Obama addresses the annual meeting of the Business Council at the Park Hyatt. The President remarks about the administration's ongoing efforts to spur job creation and the important role the business community plays in efforts to rebuild the economy. The President discusses the urgent need to pass Wall Street reform and address core principles of reform that will protect consumers and put in place clear rules of the road to help prevent another crisis. The President also meets with Elie Wiesel in the private dining room at the White House.
- May 5 – President Obama meets with Senator Kyl and Senator Hatch in the Oval Office. The President signs the Caregivers and Veterans Omnibus Health Services Act of 2010, which will improve health care services for veterans and expand caregiver benefits and training. The President also delivers remarks at a Cinco de Mayo reception in the Rose Garden.
- May 6 – President Obama meets with his national security team on Afghanistan and Pakistan behind closed doors in the Situation Room.
- May 9 – President Obama delivers the commencement address at Hampton University in Hampton, Virginia.
- May 10 – Due to the impending retirement of Justice John Paul Stevens, President Obama nominates Elena Kagan to the Supreme Court.
- May 12 – President Obama attends a bilateral meeting and joint press conference with President Hamid Karzai of Afghanistan.
- May 17 – President Obama signs the Daniel Pearl Freedom of the Press Act in the Oval Office. The President then welcomes the NCAA Champion University of Connecticut women's basketball team.
- May 22 – President Obama delivers the commencement address at the United States Military Academy at West Point in West Point, New York.
- May 24 – The President meets with Prime Minister Saad Hariri of Lebanon at the White House.
- May 25 – The President meets with President Giorgio Napolitano of Italy at the White House.
- May 27 – President Obama holds a news conference in the East Room to answer questions about the BP Deepwater Horizon Gulf of Mexico oil spill.

== June ==
- June 1 – President Obama meets with President Alan García of Peru.
- June 2 – The president and First Lady host a concert honoring Sir Paul McCartney.
- June 3 – President Obama delivers remarks to the United States-India Strategic Dialogue at a reception held by Secretary of State Clinton.
- June 4 – The president participates in a meeting with Coast Guard Admiral Thad Allen and Louisiana local elected officials at the Louis Armstrong International Airport in Kenner, Louisiana.
- June 9 – The president meets with President Mahmoud Abbas of the Palestinian Authority.
- June 10 – The President meets with family members of casualties due to the BP Deepwater Horizon explosion.
- June 14 – President Obama travels to the Gulf Coast to evaluate efforts to cap the BP oil spill.
- June 15 – Speaking from the Oval Office, the President addresses the nation about the BP oil spill.
- June 25 – The President travels to Muskoka, Canada for the G8 Summit and participates in various sessions and meetings.
- June 26 – The president participates in the G8 Working session in Muskoka and then travels to Toronto, Ontario, Canada for the G20 Summit. The President holds separate bilateral meetings with Prime Minister David Cameron of the United Kingdom, President Lee Myung-bak of South Korea, President Hu Jintao of China and attends the G20 Working Dinner.
- June 27 – The president has a morning meeting with President Susilo Bambang Yudhoyono of Indonesia and then attends the G20 Leaders Working Sessions and various plenary sessions. In the late afternoon he meets with Prime Minister Manmohan Singh of India. In the evening Obama meets with Prime Minister Naoto Kan of Japan.

== July ==
- July 2 – President Obama and Vice President Biden speak at a memorial service for Senator Robert C. Byrd.
- July 4 – The First Family holds an Independence Day celebration on the South Lawn of the White House. In attendance are military heroes and their families along with administrative staff and their families.
- July 6 – In the fifth meeting between President Obama and Israeli Prime Minister Benjamin Netanyahu, both agree to encourage direct Israeli-Palestinian peace talks.
- July 8 – President Obama travels to Kansas City, Missouri and visits Smith Electric Vehicles plant which received a $32 million Recovery Act Grant to build all-electric trucks.
- July 12 – The President hosts President Leonel Fernández of the Dominican Republic for a working meeting at the White House.
- July 13 - President Obama released the National HIV/AIDS Strategy, the nation's first comprehensive plan to address the HIV epidemic in the United States and coordinate efforts across the federal government.
- July 15 – The President travels to Holland, Michigan and delivers remarks at a groundbreaking ceremony for Compact Power battery plant.
- July 21 – President Obama signs the Dodd-Frank Wall Street Reform and Consumer Protection Act, considered to be the largest financial system overhaul since the New Deal. The law recognizes complex financial derivatives and protects consumers from unfair practices in loans and credit cards by establishing a new consumer protection agency.
- July 28 – President Obama travels to Edison, New Jersey and delivers remarks about the Small Business Jobs Initiative.
- July 30 – President Obama travels to the Detroit, Michigan area to promote the government bailout of the auto industry. The President speaks to workers at the Detroit Chrysler plant and workers at the General Motors' Hamtramck auto assembly plant in Hamtramck, Michigan

== August ==
Obama address 8-28-2010

- August 3 – President Obama delivers remarks at George Mason University to mark the implementation of the Post-911 GI bill. In the afternoon the President meets with the Emir of Kuwait Sabah Al-Ahmad Al-Jaber Al-Sabah
- August 8 – President Obama's nominee, Elena Kagan, is sworn in as an Associate Justice of the Supreme Court.
- August 9 – The New Orleans Saints football team visit the White House to be honored for their 2009 Super Bowl Championship.
- August 10 – The President receives the credentials of Foreign Ambassadors and marks the beginning of their service in Washington, D.C.
- August 11 – After a morning meeting with his national security team on the subject of Iraq, the President delivers remarks and signs the Manufacturing Enhancement Act.
- August 13 – President Obama supports an Islamic center near New York's ground zero in a speech at a White House Iftar dinner celebrating the Islamic holy month of Ramadan.
- August 31 – New design of the Oval Office is presented to the press. The President announces an end to the combat mission in Iraq with a speech given from the Oval Office.

== September ==
- September 14 – The President delivers his second annual Back-to-School speech.
- September 18 – President Obama delivers remarks at the Congressional Black Caucus Foundation annual Phoenix Award Dinner.
- September 20 – The President awards Chief Master Sergeant Richard Etchberger, U.S. Air Force, the Medal of Honor for conspicuous gallantry during the Vietnam War.
- September 23 – The President travels to New York City and addresses the United Nations General Assembly. The President also has bilateral meetings with Premier Wen Jiabao of China, Prime Minister Naoto Kan of Japan, President Ilham Aliyev of Azerbaijan, President Juan Manuel Santos of Colombia, and President Roza Otunbayeva of Kyrgyzstan.
- September 27 – The President signs the Small Business Jobs and Credit Act of 2010 into law.

== October ==
- October 4 – President Obama meets with the Economic Recovery Advisory Board.
- October 5 – Along with Jill Biden, the President conducts the first ever White House Summit of Community Colleges. President Obama signs "Rosa's Law" (S.2781) which changes references in many Federal Statutes that refer to mental retardation to refer, instead to, "intellectual disability".
- October 6 – The President awards Staff Sergeant Robert J. Miller, U.S. Army, the Medal of Honor for conspicuous gallantry in Afghanistan.
- October 8 – President Obama signs the 21st Century Communications and Video Accessibility Act of 2010.
- October 15 – President Obama meets with former Secretary of State Condoleezza Rice.
- October 19 – President Obama signs a White House Initiative on Educational Excellence for Hispanic Americans in the East Room.
- October 22 – President Obama traveled to Las Vegas, Nevada, where he hosted a rally which was organized by Rakitha Hettiarachchi (The Political Campaign Director of Nevada State Democratic Party) to support the reelection of Senate Majority Leader Harry Reid. The rally was considered as one of the most successful political rallies in the history of Nevada State politics.
- October 25 – The President tours the American Cord and Webbing factory in Woonsocket, Rhode Island, and speaks with workers there.
- October 31 – President Obama issues a statement honoring former Kennedy aide Ted Sorensen, who died today. The President visits Cleveland, Ohio, stumping for that state's governor, Ted Strickland.

== November ==
- November 2 – President Obama appears on the Ryan Seacrest (and other) radio shows to appeal to young voters to vote on Election Day.
- November 3 – President Obama holds a news conference in the White House to acknowledge that he and the Democratic party took a "shellacking" in the mid-term elections.
- November 6 – The President and First Lady begin a ten-day trip to Asia to improve export opportunities.
- November 14 – President Obama and Mrs. Obama return from their four-nation tour having met with various world leaders, spoke at multiple venues, held news conferences, and attended the G-20 and APEC plenary sessions and ceremonies.
- November 16 – President Obama awards U.S. Army Staff Sergeant Salvatore Giunta the Medal of Honor for conspicuous gallantry in the Afghan War.
- November 19 – The President arrives in Lisbon, Portugal to attend the Lisbon summit and discuss the Afghanistan situation, NATO and the European Union with European allies. President Obama holds various bilateral meetings with President Aníbal Cavaco Silva and Prime Minister José Sócrates of Portugal, and with President Mikheil Saakashvili of Georgia.
- November 20 – While at the Lisbon summit, President Obama attends various meetings pertaining to Afghanistan and various Russian Council sessions and holds a bilateral meeting with President Karzai of Afghanistan.
- November 23 – President Obama and South Korean President Lee Myung-bak agree in a telephone call to hold joint military and training exercises "in the coming days", in response to the Shelling of Yeonpyeong incident.
- November 24 – President Obama officially pardons two turkeys, "Apple" and "Cider", during the National Thanksgiving Turkey Presentation.
- November 26 – President Obama is inadvertently struck in the lip by Reynaldo Decerega's elbow during a game of basketball at Fort McNair; the President receives twelve stitches at the White House Medical Unit to close the wound.
- November 29 – President Obama proposes a two-year pay freeze for federal employees.
- November 30 – President Obama meets with Congressional leaders of both parties, a meeting that is dubbed the "Slurpee Summit".

== December ==
- December 1 – The President meets over lunch with District of Columbia mayor-elect Vincent Gray at the White House.
- December 3 – The President makes an unannounced trip to Afghanistan to speak with that country's president, Hamid Karzai, and to visit with American troops. President Obama grants the first presidential pardons of his administration to nine people.
- December 6 – President Obama speaks to Chinese President Hu Jintao, by phone, and urges him to unite with other regional powers and send a clear message to North Korea that its "provocations were unacceptable". The President announces a compromise agreement with Congressional Republicans regarding a tax package that revolves around the question of extending the Bush tax cuts, then begins an effort to convince unhappy Congressional Democrats to accept it.
- December 7 – President Obama holds a news conference regarding the tax cut and unemployment benefits compromise.
- December 13 – The President signs the Healthy, Hunger-Free Kids Act of 2010 into law.
- December 16 – In an Administrative Assessment of the eight-year Afghanistan war, President Obama hails significant progress but says it remains "a very difficult endeavor".
- December 17 – President Obama signs the Tax Relief, Unemployment Insurance Reauthorization, and Job Creation Act of 2010 costing $858 billion, the supermajority from extending the Bush tax cuts, raising the exemption threshold of the Alternative Minimum Tax, and reducing the FICA payroll tax.
- December 22 – President Obama signs the Don't Ask, Don't Tell Repeal Act of 2010 before departing Washington to join his family for his planned 11-day vacation at Plantation Estate in Hawaii.
- December 25 – The President and First Lady visit members of the military and their families at Marine Corps Base Hawaii.

== See also ==
- Timeline of the Barack Obama presidency (2009–2017)

U.S. presidential administration timelines
Preceded by Obama presidency (2009)	Obama presidency (2010)	Succeeded by Obama presidency (2011)
