= PNB =

The initials PNB or Pnb may refer to:

== Banking ==
- Pemodalan Nasional Berhad, in Malaysia
- Philippine National Bank in the Philippines
- Punjab National Bank in India
- Philadelphia National Bank, renamed to CoreStates

== Companies & organizations ==
- Pacific Northwest Bell, a former division of AT&T Corporation and then US West
- Pacific Northwest Ballet, Seattle, Washington
- Pickleball New Brunswick, a Canadian provincial sport authority

== Policing ==
- Police notebook, used by police
- Police Negotiating Board
- Bolivarian National Police

== Politics ==
- Parti National Basque, the Basque National Party
- Parti National Breton, the Breton National Party
- Parti Nationaliste Breton, the Breton Nationalist Party
- Partners for a New Beginning

== Other ==
- Peanut butter
- Peripheral nerve block
- ISO 639 code for Pakistani Punjabi language (lower case letters)
- Pottery Neolithic B, a division of the Pottery Neolithic period in archaeology
