= Alan Fleischmann =

Alan H. Fleischmann
- Education: Johns Hopkins University School of Advanced International Studies (M.A.); American University (B.A. & B.S.)
- Occupation: businessman
- Title: Laurel Strategies, Inc. (Founder, Chairman & CEO); ImagineNations Group (co-founder)

Alan H. Fleischmann is a businessman who founded and leads the business advisory firm Laurel Strategies.

Fleischmann is also a member of the Atlantic Council's Board of Directors.

== Biography ==
Fleischmann was awarded an M.A. with honors from the Johns Hopkins University School of Advanced International Studies (SAIS), where he serves on its board. He received a B.A. and B.S. with honors from the American University.

Previously, Fleischmann was a principal, partner, and board member of Albright Stonebridge Group.

Fleischmann co-founded ImagineNations Group.

Fleischmann was a member of the Obama Presidential Transition from 2008 to 2009, and was a member of the White House Commission on Presidential Scholars. He was an Advisory Board Member of the Export–Import Bank of the United States.

In September 2010, Fleischmann announced, at the Clinton Global Initiative with Yahoo! founder Jerry Yang, a commitment to expand the ImagineNations Network worldwide. ImagineNations is a founding member of the Partners for a New Beginning.

Fleischmann is a lifetime member of the Council on Foreign Relations and a board member of the Atlantic Council. He serves as a trustee of the Jane Goodall Legacy Foundation. In addition, Fleischmann serves on the board of the American Council on Germany (ACG), the Cal Ripken Foundation, and the Just Capital Foundation. Fleischmann serves on the board of directors of the R Adams Cowley Shock Trauma Emergency Medical Center.

Fleischmann is a board member of the Phillips Collection arts museum, an Advisory Director on the Board of Trustees of Carnegie Hall, a member of the board of trustees of the Washington National Opera at the John F. Kennedy Center for Performing Arts and a member of the Board of Trustees of Morehouse College.

Fleischman spoke at the WORLD.MINDS meeting in June 2025 in Washington DC about China, AI and the transatlantic relationship.
