= E-Mentor Corps =

E-Mentor Corps is a project of the US State Department that will allow entrepreneurs seeking advice to access mentors on-line. The E-Mentor Corps will call on business leaders and proven entrepreneurs in the United States and overseas to serve as E-Mentors to aspiring and emerging entrepreneurs around the world.

== Collaboration and support ==
E-Mentor Corps is sponsored by leading organisations such as Intel and Ernst & Young.

== Guidance ==
E-Mentors will commit to provide guidance, insights and support to mentees for at least several hours per month for at least 3 months - via e-mail, telephone, video conference and other means of communication. It is hoped that many of these connections will spawn longer-term collaborations.

== Platforms ==
The Department of State will encourage mentors and mentees to connect through any number of channels and mechanisms. To facilitate connection, the Department of State has partnered with three platforms which will serve as options for mentor and mentee connection: ImagineNations Group (imagine-network.org), Ning and LinkedIn.

== Benefits ==
- E-Mentor Corps will provide mentorship and concrete support to new entrepreneurs.
- E-Mentor Corps will forge and deepen ties between entrepreneurs in the United States and entrepreneurs around the globe and in the process advance entrepreneurship, innovation and economic opportunity.

== See also ==
- Global Entrepreneurship Program
- Partners for a New Beginning
- Presidential Summit on Entrepreneurship
