= Global Entrepreneurship Summit =

International event for entrepreneurship

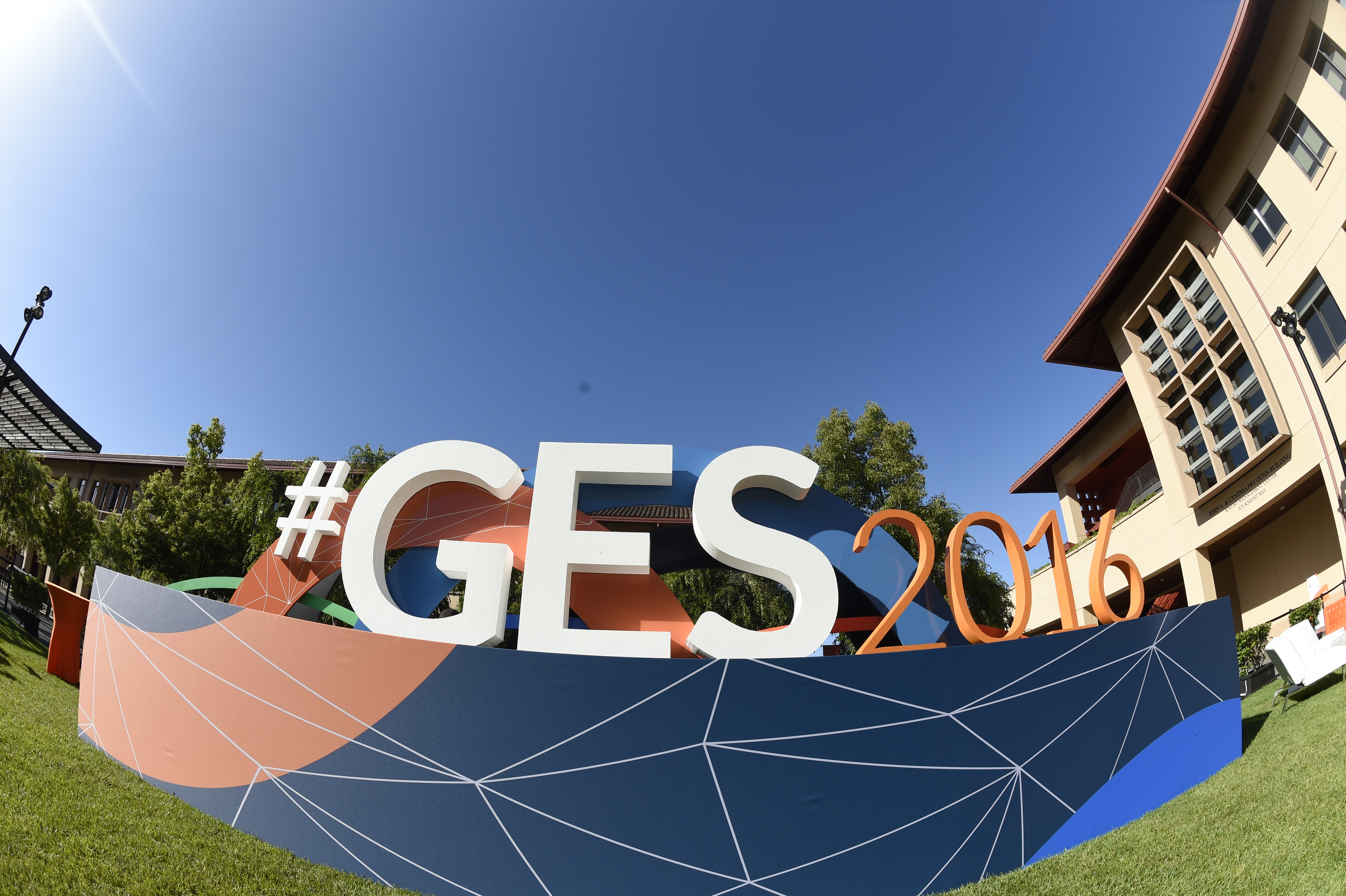
GES 2016

The Global Entrepreneurship Summit is an annual event organized by the federal government of the United States, in partnership with foreign government hosts. The summit originated from an event organized by the Obama Administration called the Presidential Summit on Entrepreneurship, which was held in April 2010 in Washington, D.C. It brought together entrepreneurs from the United States, Europe, Africa, the Middle East, South Asia, and Southeast Asia to discuss the importance of social and economic entrepreneurship, establish entrepreneurship as an important area of policy focus, and strengthen mutually beneficial relationships between entrepreneurs.

Subsequent Global Entrepreneurship Summits have occurred in Istanbul; Dubai; Kuala Lumpur; Marrakesh; Nairobi; Palo Alto, California; Hyderabad; and The Hague.

== Background and timeline ==
In his "A New Beginning" speech on June 4, 2009, at Cairo University in Cairo, Egypt, President of the United States Barack Obama announced that he would host a summit on entrepreneurship to "identify how we can deepen ties between business leaders, foundations and social entrepreneurs in the United States and Muslim communities around the world."

=== 2010 ===
The first Global Entrepreneurship Summit, titled the Presidential Summit on Entrepreneurship, was held from April 26 to 27, 2010, in Washington, D.C. Unlike most government-organized events, the summit purposely focused on private sector and civil society attendees, instead of government representatives. As a result, invitees included entrepreneurs, investors, academics, leaders of entrepreneurship networks, non-profits, foundations, and businesses who were actively promoting business or social entrepreneurship in Muslim communities around the world. The summit also hosted unofficial side events surrounding the formal conference, as well as smaller conferences hosted in countries around the world, leading up to the meeting in Washington, D.C.

Regarding the event's role as a foreign policy tool, U.S. Secretary of State Hillary Clinton, who spoke at the event's conclusion, said "the summit reflects the new approach to foreign policy that President Obama described last year at Cairo University, one that we have been putting into practice through partnerships based on shared values, mutual respect and mutual responsibility."

=== 2011 ===
The second summit, with a theme of "Entrepreneurship, Values and Development: A Global Agenda", was held in Istanbul, Turkey, between December 3 and 6, 2011. The summit aimed to "develop entrepreneurship culture for a sustainable development and integration of cultures as well as to support global cooperation among entrepreneurs worldwide". The event included the GISTech-I Competition, a multinational venture that invited applicants in 43 Muslim majority countries to submit proposals and videos detailing their ideas for technology innovation.

=== 2012 ===
The third summit was held in Dubai, United Arab Emirates, from December 11 to 12, 2012. The event was presented by Entrepreneurial Ventures of Arabia. According to the U.S. Department of State, the event "provided an opportunity to link U.S. economic leadership with an encouraging trend towards entrepreneurship in Muslim-majority countries".

=== 2013 ===
The fourth summit took place from October 11 to 12, 2013, in Kuala Lumpur, Malaysia, the country where the notable Entrepreneurship Conference takes place. The event brought together more than 3,000 people from over 100 countries. The summit kicked off with Global Startup Youth, a three-day pre-summit event in Kuala Lumpur run by Startup Malaysia, which invited 540 people ages 18 to 25 from more than 90 countries to come together and generate ideas for high-growth, globally sustainable ventures.

=== 2014 ===
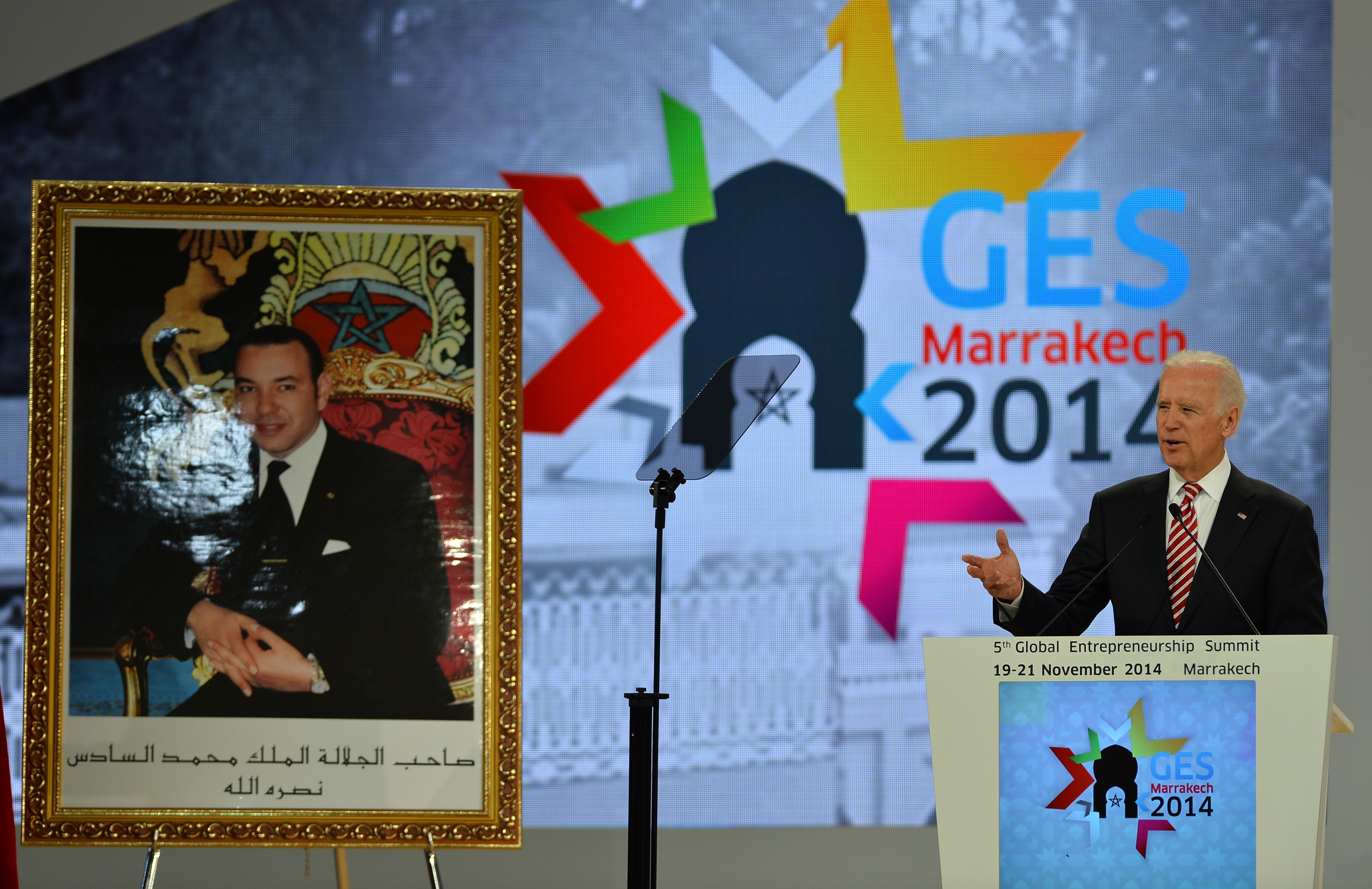
Joe Biden at the GES 2014

The fifth summit was held from November 19 to 21, 2014, in Marrakesh, Morocco. The summit brought together nearly 4,000 entrepreneurs, business, government, and thought leaders. Led by Vice President Joe Biden, the U.S. delegation included several cabinet members, heads of agencies, and senior U.S. government officials. The summit focused on technology and included a day dedicated to specific challenges and opportunities relevant to female entrepreneurs.

=== 2015 ===
The sixth summit was held from July 25 to 26, 2015, in Nairobi, Kenya, and addressed topics including global innovation through science and technology, financing entrepreneurship, preparing for growth, expanding horizons in relation to the rising power, and the potential of female entrepreneurs to create innovative business and social impact. The summit allowed aspiring entrepreneurs to share their entrepreneurial journeys, including a series called "Ignite Talks" given by three Tony Elumelu Entrepreneurs. Other speakers included Brian Chesky, co-founder of Airbnb. The delegation also visited the "iHub" startup incubator.

=== 2016 ===
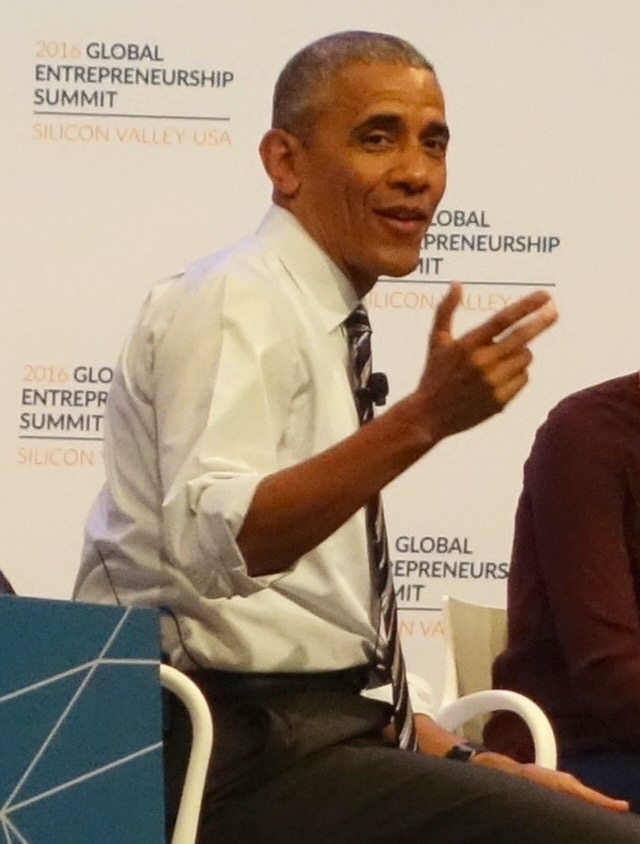
Obama at GES 2016

The seventh summit was held at Stanford University Palo Alto, California, from June 22 to 24, 2016, which was the second time for the U.S. hosted the summit. The event included 700 entrepreneurs and a number of high-level government officials, including President Barack Obama, John Kerry. Keynote speakers included Travis Kalanick, CEO of Uber, who gave an opening speech about Entrepreneurial Inspiration, and Mary Grove, Director at Google for Entrepreneurs, who gave the closing speech about Trends in Entrepreneurship. Major themes included women's entrepreneurial leadership; entrepreneurship in Africa, China, and the Middle East; and secrets of Silicon Valley.

=== 2017 ===
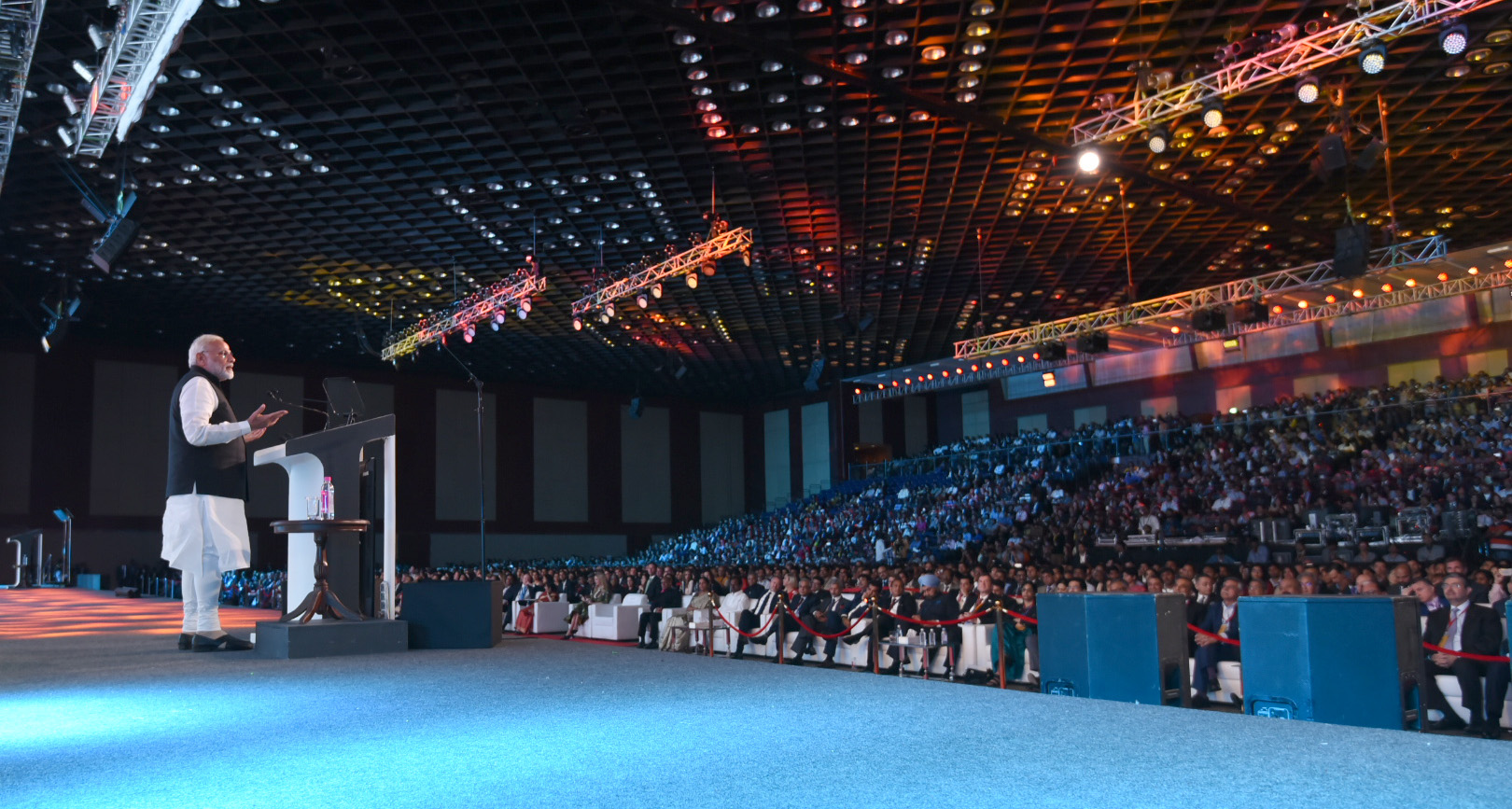
The Prime Minister, Shri Narendra Modi addressing at the Global Entrepreneurship Summit-2017, in Hyderabad on November 28, 2017

The eighth summit was held in Hyderabad, India, from November 28 to 30, 2017. Ivanka Trump led the U.S. contingent to the summit, which highlighted the theme of "Women First, Prosperity for All" and focused on supporting female entrepreneurs and fostering global economic growth. Women represented 52.5% of entrepreneurs, investors, and ecosystem supporters at the summit, which was attended by 1,500 participants, including approximately 300 investors. The Women Entrepreneurship Platform was set up at the conclusion of the event after an announcement made by Amitabh Kant, the CEO of NITI Aayog. The summit focused on four innovative, high-growth industries: healthcare and life sciences, digital economy and financial technology, energy and infrastructure and media and entertainment.

=== 2019 ===
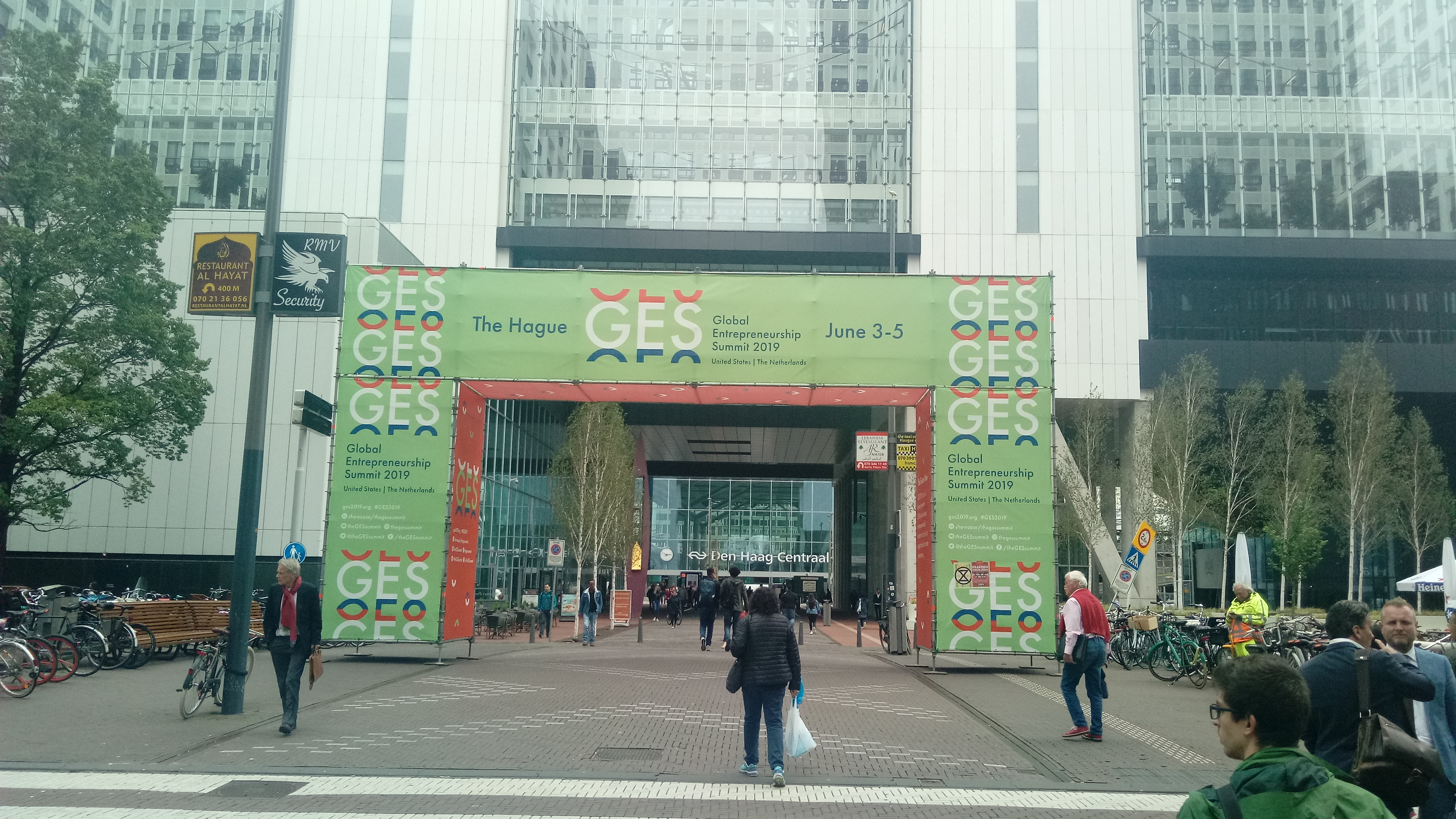
GES 2019 in The Hague

The ninth summit was held in The Hague, Netherlands, from June 3 to 5, 2019. The event was co-hosted by U.S. Secretary of State Mike Pompeo and Prime Minister Mark Rutte. It focused on five key investment areas: agriculture and food, connectivity, energy, health, and water.

== Notable participants ==
- Joe Biden, vice president of the United States (2011)
- Hillary Clinton, U.S. Secretary of State (2010)
- Tim Draper, founder of Draper Fisher Jurvetson (2016)
- Daymond John, founder, president, and CEO of FUBU (2015)
- Travis Kalanick, former CEO of Uber (2016)
- Uhuru Kenyatta, president of Kenya (2015)
- Jonathan Margolis. U.S. Assistant Deputy Secretary of State (2013)
- Narendra Modi, Prime Minister of India
- Barack Obama, president of the United States (2015, 2016)
- Mike Pompeo, U.S. Secretary of State (2019)
- Penny Pritzker, U.S. Secretary of Commerce (2014)
- Nirmala Sitharaman, Minister of Defence (India) (2017)
- Ivanka Trump, Senior Advisor to the President of the United States (2017)
- Anne Wojcicki, CEO of 23andMe (2016)
- Mark Zuckerberg, CEO of Facebook (2016)

== See also ==
Leadership & Entrepreneurship Summit (2021)
