= Mitra Robot =

Humanoid robot from Invento Robotics

Mitra Robot (Mitra: a Hindi word meaning "friend") is a Humanoid Robot designed and developed by the Indian startup Invento Robotics, a robotic company in Bangalore founded by Balaji Viswanathan. Mitra Robot made its first appearance in November 2017 at the Global Entrepreneurship Summit where it greeted Ivanka Trump, senior advisor to former U.S. President Donald Trump, and interacted with Indian Prime Minister Narendra Modi.

== Description ==
The five foot tall robot, Mitra-2, is India's first humanoid robot built and designed to engage in hospitality management and workplace productivity. Mitra can be integrated with a range of CRM applications and interacts with customers using voice. It also received media coverage in 2017 during the Global Entrepreneurship Summit.

== Usage ==
Mitra Robot has been used in banks, weddings, birthday parties, hotels, malls, airports, cinema halls and hospitals. In 2020, the robot connected relatives to those suffering from COVID at the Yatharth Super Speciality Hospital in Noida by means of patrolling the wards.

== Events ==
Mitra robot was used in Tathva 19, the annual techno-management fest organized by NIT-C (National Institute of Technology Calicut), held in Mukkam, Kozhikode on 18 October 2019. Mitra reportedly greeted the dignitaries and delivered a speech thanking the Tathva team.
