= Baybars Altuntaş =

Turkish writer and businessman

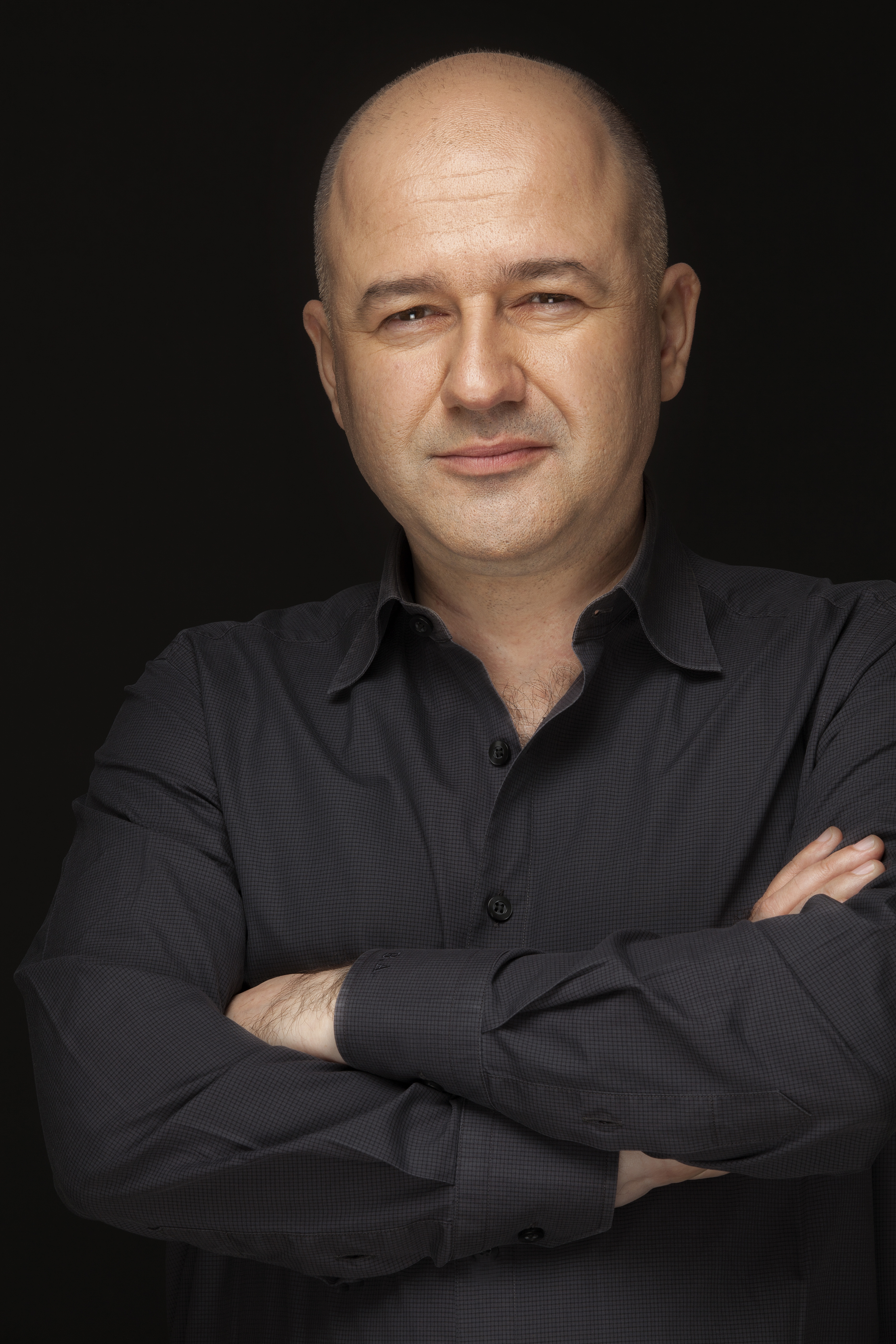
- Born: October 27, 1969 (age 56); Istanbul, Turkey
- Education: Boğaziçi University
- Organization: Deulcom International
- Website: baybarsaltuntas.com

Baybars Altuntaş (born October 27, 1969) is a Turkish entrepreneur, angel investor, speaker and author based in Istanbul. He founded Deulcom International, a vocational training school in Turkey in 1992 and currently serves as the president of the executive committee of the company. He is currently a jury member on the new Turkish entrepreneurship program and is the current host of the Turkish version of The Weakest Link, En Zayıf Halka

In 2011, he wrote Off the Bus, Into a BMW (Otobüsten İndim BMW'ye Bindim), the story of his life and his rise to success in the business world. It was translated into Albanian in 2012 and translated into English in 2014. He was known by EBAN - The European Trade Association of Business Angels as the 2018’s Individual in Europe who engaged with Entrepreneurial Ecosystem.

== Early life and education ==
Altuntaş was born in Istanbul, Turkey on October 27, 1970, to Engin Altuntaş, a career army officer, and school teacher Meral Altuntaş. He lived with his grandparents in Edirne for the first few years of his life and moved to Istanbul to live with his parents when his younger brother was born.

Immediately after graduation, he started working as an office clerk in a travel agency. Not long after starting that job, he got admission into university in Turkey, Boğaziçi University. As a university student, he worked part-time at a travel agency that organized tours for children, and on the weekends he gave private lessons in math, German and English. He graduated with a degree in English Language Teaching in 1997 by which time he had already founded a company.

== Business ==
Altuntaş serves as the president of Links Angel BAN Business Angels Network, an organization he founded in 2012. He is also the founder and currently CEO of the Links Angel BAN Partners, a consulting chain for SMEs in Turkey. He is the Vice President of EBAN (The European Trade Association for Early Stage Market Players and Business Angels) in Brussels. He is the Chairman of EBAN Institute. He is the Coordinator of European Business Angels Week (EBAW). He is the Ambassador of the World Entrepreneurship Forum to Turkey and the Balkan Countries. He is a sought-after speaker on entrepreneurship and has represented Turkey in many international forums, including the Presidential Summit on Entrepreneurship at the White House in Washington, D.C., in 2010. Among the 150 delegates, he was able to have a private meeting with President Obama.

In 1992, while he was a university student, he invested $400 to launch Deulcom International, the first private vocational training institution in Turkey.

He is the president of Links Angel BAN, a business angel network founded to invest in start-ups. Among the founders is Aktifbank, one of the few banks in the world to invest in early stage start-ups. He is the Founder and Executive Committee Chairman of Links Angel BAN partners, the largest consulting chain in Turkey for entrepreneurs and companies at all stages, from start-up to growth and maturity.

== Selected publications ==
=== Books ===
After his appearance on Dragons’ Den, publishing houses started calling him with proposals for his autobiography. His first book was Off the Bus, Into a BMW, which, after the first year, was translated into Albanian and became a bestseller in Albania. His second book was Basarida Tanri Parcacigi, or The God Particle in Success. He is also a co-author of Planet Entrepreneur, published by Wiley in the US. The global version of the Off the Bus, Into a BMW in English is published by Balboa Publications.

=== Articles ===
Altuntaş writes on entrepreneurship for the Para Dergisi, a weekly economy magazine in Turkey. He has also contributed to Migrant Woman and Middle East Business Magazine & News.

== Social responsibility activities ==
Altuntaş is the Ambassador of the World Entrepreneurship Forum to Turkey and the Balkan countries.

He is the vice president of EBAN as well as the Chairman of the EBAN Institute. He is also the coordinator of the European Business Angels Week (EBAW).

He is the President of the Business Angels Association of Turkey (TBAA), whose aim is to ease the way for entrepreneurs planning start-ups to access both domestic and international financial sources. The TBAA represents Turkey at the World Business Angels Association in the UK.

He represents Turkey on the Board of the World Business Angels Association.

He is the Coordinator of the European Business Angels Week. and chairman of the EBAN Institute, Belgium

== Awards ==
- 2010 The Businessman of the Year, Ekovitrin, Turkey
- 2010 The Businessman of the Year, Girne American University, Turkish Republic of Northern Cyprus
- 2018 Best individual in Europe Globally Engaging the Early Stage Investment within the Entrepreneurial Ecosystem, Belgium

== Membership ==
Baybars Altuntaş is a regular jury member for the European Business Awards.

Baybars Altuntaş was also a jury member of entrepreneurship competitions, global venture events, and university students' business plan competitions.

== Bibliography ==
- Off the Bus to BMW (Otobüsten İndim BMW'ye Bindim) (2011) ISBN 9786054607662
- Basarida Tanri Parcacigi (2012) ISBN 978-6054607655
- Planet Entrepreneur: The World Entrepreneurship Forum's Guide to Business Success Around the World chapter titled Hello Entrepreneurs, Goodbye Borders (2013) ISBN 978-1118789520
