= Women Entrepreneurship Platform =

The Women Entrepreneurship Platform (WEP) is a unified access portal which brings together women from different regions of India, across economies to realize their entrepreneurial aspirations. The idea of the Platform was first mooted by Shri Amitabh Kant, CEO, NITI Aayog who announced the setting-up of a Women Entrepreneurship Platform in NITI Aayog at the conclusion of the 8th Global Entrepreneurship Summit (GES) held in Hyderabad in 2017.

== Partners ==
DICE Districts, CRISIL, NASSCOM, FICCI, and Digital Leadership Institute headed by Dr. Somdutta Singh are enablement and knowledge partners.
