= A New Beginning (speech) =

2009 speech by U.S. President Barack Obama

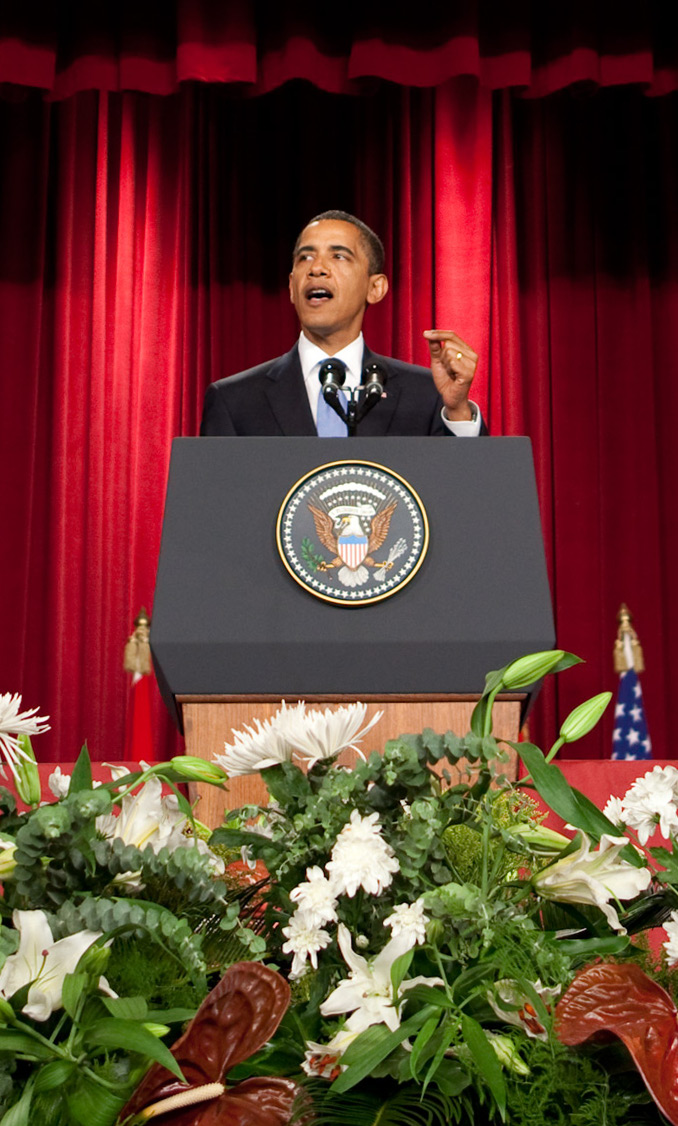
- US President Barack Obama delivering his "A New Beginning" speech
- Date: 4 June 2009
- Time: 13:10 – 14:05 (EGY [UTC+3:00])
- Venue: Major Reception Hall at Cairo University, Cairo, Egypt
- Organised by: Cairo University; Al-Azhar University
- Full text: The full text of "A New Beginning" at Wikisource
- Website: obamawhitehouse.archives.gov/issues/foreign-policy/presidents-speech-cairo-a-new-beginning

"A New Beginning" was the name of a speech delivered by United States President Barack Obama on 4 June 2009, from the Major Reception Hall at Cairo University in Egypt. Al-Azhar University co-hosted the event. The speech honored a promise Obama made during his 2008 presidential campaign to give a major address to Muslims from a Muslim capital during his first few months as president.

White House Press Secretary Robert Gibbs indicated that Egypt was chosen because "it is a country that in many ways represents the heart of the Arab world." Egypt is considered a key player in the Middle East peace process as well as a major recipient of American military and economic aid. Reuters reporter Ross Colvin reported that the speech would attempt to mend the United States' relations with the Muslim world, which he wrote were "severely damaged" during the presidency of George W. Bush.

== Background ==
In his inaugural address on 20 January, President Obama reached out to the Muslim world with "a new way forward, based on mutual interest and mutual respect". He also said he would be willing to "extend a hand" to those "who cling to power through corruption and deceit" if they "are willing to unclench" their fists. His first interview as president was to Arab broadcaster Al Arabiya.

After taking office, Obama stated his support for the creation of a Palestinian state and announced that he would engage in negotiations with Iran. He also declared he opposed Israeli settlements and wanted to revive peace talks. In an interview to Al Arabiya, few days after his inauguration, Obama declared: "my job to the Muslim world is to communicate that the Americans are not your enemy." "White House Spokesman Robert Gibbs stated he will review particular issues of concern, such as violent extremism and the Israeli-Palestinian conflict and he will discuss new areas for partnership going forward that serve the mutual interests of our people."

On 19 March, Obama continued his outreach to the Muslim world, releasing a Nowruz video message to the people and government of Iran. This attempt at outreach was rebuffed by the Iranian leadership. President Obama's first trip to a Muslim majority country occurred on 6 and 7 April when he visited Turkey and spoke to the Grand National Assembly. The speech was well received by many Arab governments.

=== Meetings with world leaders ===
Obama met King Abdullah of Jordan on 21 April and Israeli President Shimon Peres on 5 May. On 19 May, he met Netanyahu at the White House, where they discussed the Israeli–Palestinian conflict and Israel's settlements in the West Bank. While Obama said a two state solution was a priority, Benyamin Netanyahu did not explicitly endorse the creation of Palestinian state. Netanyahu said Israel has the right to continue settlements, whereas Obama called for settlement growth to be frozen. Obama also stated a "range of steps" are still available against Iran, including sanctions, if it continues its nuclear program.

Obama also met Mahmoud Abbas on 28 May. Obama reaffirmed his belief in a two-state solution, and stressed that Israel's obligation under a 2003 Middle East peace 'road map' includes stopping settlement growth and ensuring that there is a viable Palestinian state.

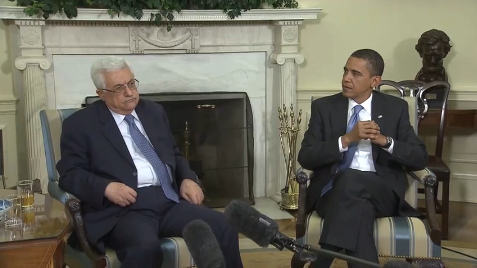
President Obama talking with Mahmoud Abbas at the White House on 28 May 2009.

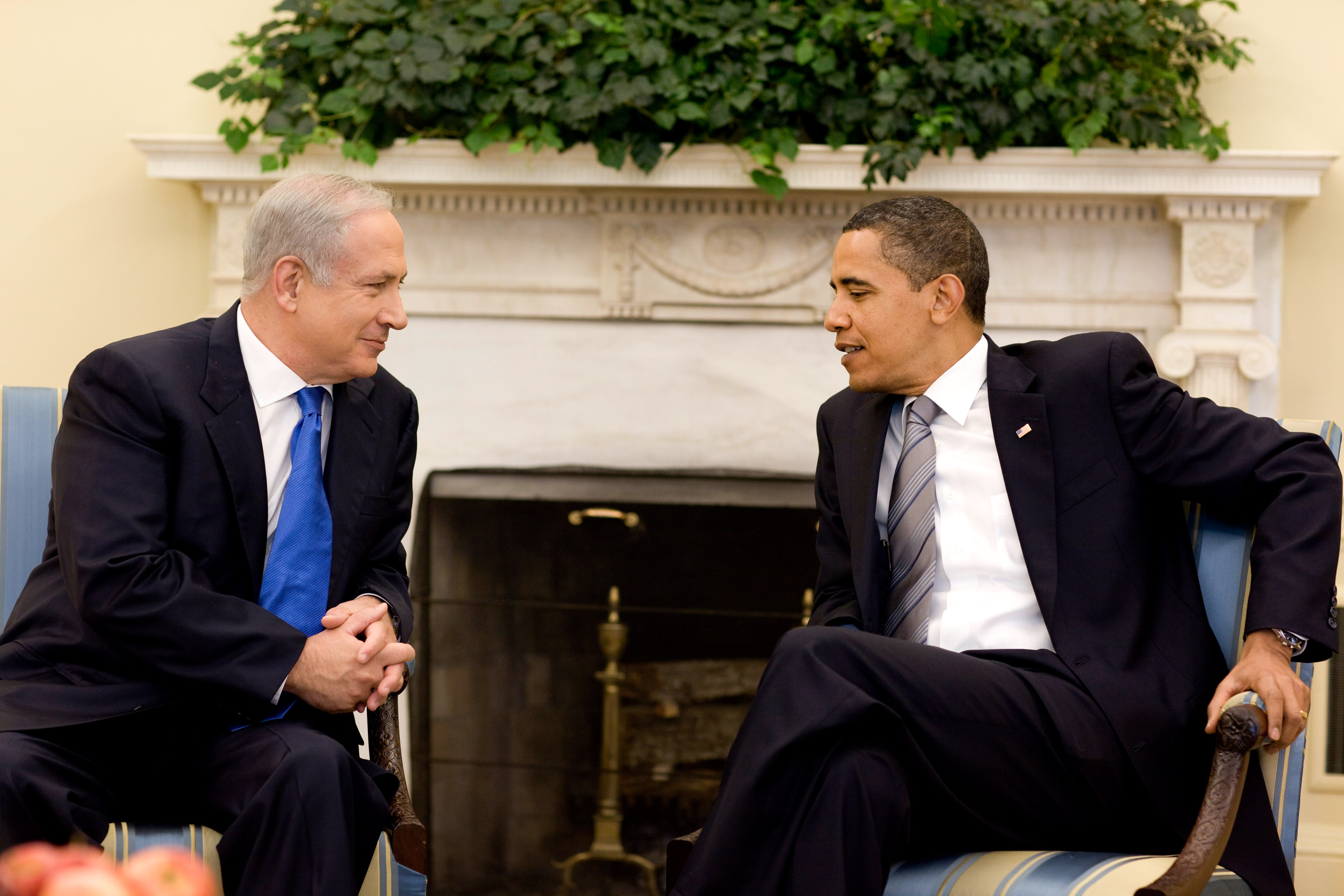
President Obama talking with Benjamin Netanyahu at the White House on 18 May 2009.

== Speech ==
=== Preparation ===
At the White House in May 2009, Obama told deputy national security advisor Ben Rhodes, and National Security Council spokesperson Denis McDonough that he intended to deliver a speech to the Muslim world from Egypt's capital Cairo. Obama believed the tensions between Muslim world and the West were rooted in colonialism. He also reportedly said that he knew from personal experience that the West and the Islam are not separate worlds because they share things such as love of God and family. Obama reportedly expressed his desire to include Islam's contributions and gender equality in the speech.

Jakarta, Rabat, Amman, Cairo, and Istanbul were all considered likely choices. Mohammed Habib, the deputy leader of the Muslim Brotherhood, Egypt's largest opposition group, dismissed Obama's trip and said it would be "useless unless it is preceded by real change in the policies of the US administration toward the Arab and Islamic world". Nevertheless, Obama's administration insisted that at least 10 members of the Muslim Brotherhood be allowed to attend the Cairo speech.

Cairo University spokeswoman Galila Mukhtar told The New York Times that "we are very proud to host the president of the United States," with spokesman Sami Abdel Aziz adding that the speech would be delivered in the Major Reception Hall. Renovations took place at the college and some final exams were postponed.

=== Before the speech ===
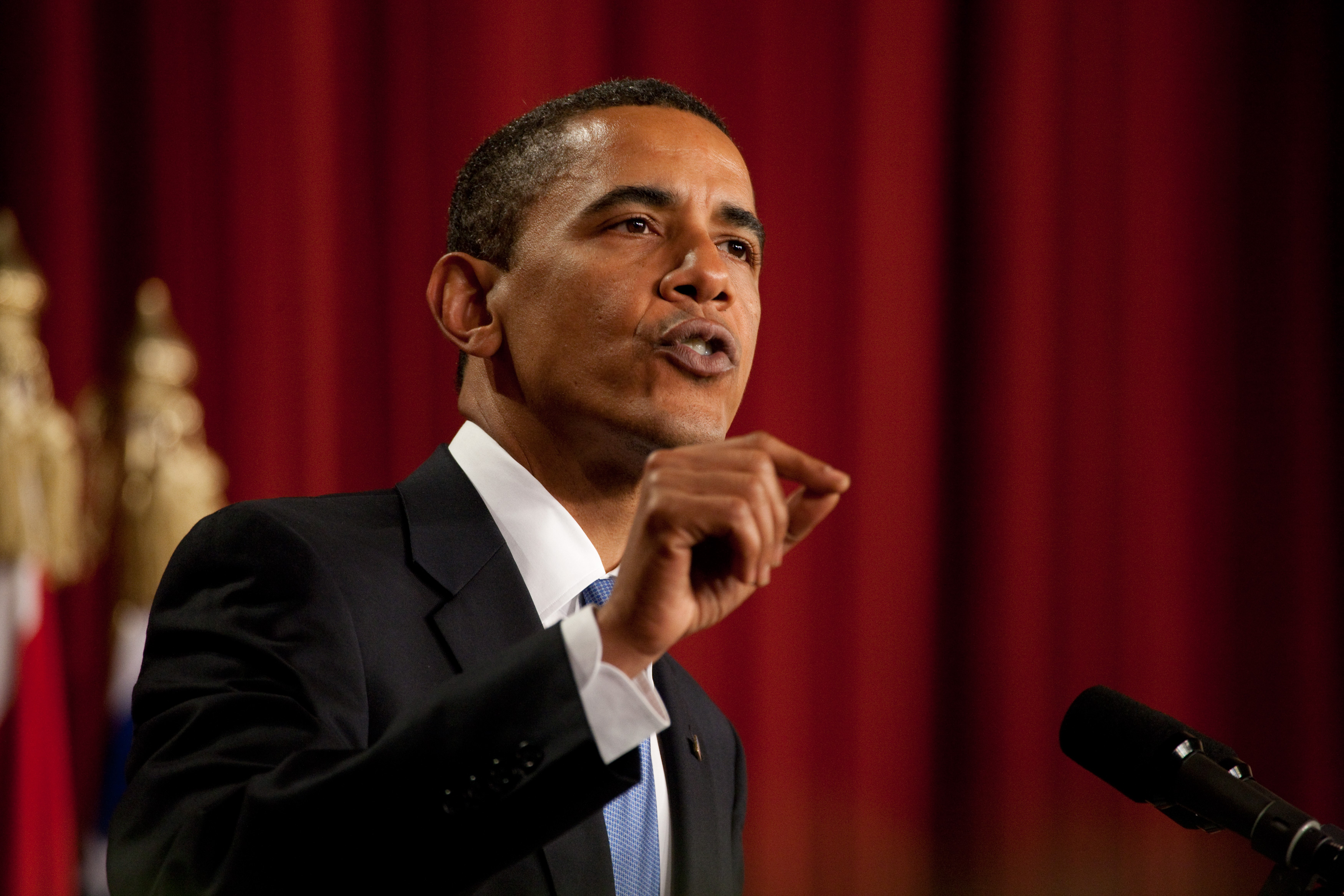
US President Barack Obama at Cairo University

On his way to Cairo, Obama stayed overnight at the ranch of King Abdullah of Saudi Arabia outside Riyadh. While there, the two leaders discussed peace and economics.

On the day of the speech, Obama and Egyptian President Hosni Mubarak met at Koubbeh Palace to discuss the Israeli-Palestinian conflict. He said the US was committed to working in partnership with countries in the Middle East. Obama later visited the Sultan Hassan Mosque, before going to Cairo University to deliver the speech.

=== Delivery ===
Video of the speech

The speech was divided into seven parts: violent extremism, the Israeli-Palestinian conflict, nuclear weapons (with a reference to Iran), democracy, religious freedom, women's rights, and economic development.

Obama's speech called for improved mutual understanding and relations between the Islamic world and the West. He said he should do more to confront violent extremism. He reaffirmed America's alliance with Israel, calling their mutual bond "unbreakable", but also described Palestinian statelessness as "intolerable" and recognizing their aspirations for statehood and dignity as legitimate as Israel's desire for a Jewish homeland.

The speech opened with Obama seeking a common ground between Muslims and the United States. He quoted from the Quran, "Be conscious of God and always speak the truth." Obama described Muslim contributions to Western civilization, citing the founding of algebra, the development of navigational tools, the invention of the fountain pen, and the influence of Islamic architecture. He described his own personal experiences with Islam, including having Muslim family members, growing up in Indonesia, a majority-Muslim country and hearing "the call of the azaan", and working "in Chicago communities where many found dignity and peace in their Muslim faith". He also listed several of the United States' connections to Islam, including Morocco being the first country to recognize the United States, American Muslim sportsmen (such as Muhammad Ali and Kareem Abdul-Jabbar) and civil rights leaders (such as Malcolm X), the Nobel Prize winner Ahmed Zewail, the Bangladeshi American architect-engineer Fazlur Khan who designed the Sears Tower, the election of Keith Ellison as the US's first Muslim congressman, and the presence of over 1,200 mosques in the US.

On the subject of the Iraq War, Obama stated, "Although I believe that the Iraqi people are ultimately better off without the tyranny of Saddam Hussein, I also believe that events in Iraq have reminded America of the need to use diplomacy and build international consensus to resolve our problems whenever possible." He also promised to "remove combat troops from Iraqi cities by July, and to remove all of our troops from Iraq by 2012".

During the "nuclear weapons" portion of the speech, Obama stated, "In the middle of the Cold War, the United States played a role in the overthrow of a democratically elected Iranian government." It was the first acknowledgement by a US President of the United States government's involvement in the 1953 Iranian coup d'état; although then-Secretary of State Madeleine Albright had acknowledged it as well in a speech in 2000.

About democracy, Obama stated that, though "America does not presume to know what is best for everyone", "I do have an unyielding belief that all people yearn for certain things: the ability to speak your mind and have a say in how you are governed; confidence in the rule of law and the equal administration of justice; government that is transparent and doesn't steal from the people; the freedom to live as you choose." He called such freedoms "human rights".

On economic development, Obama described several new funds, scholarship programs and partnerships to support education, technological development and better health care in Muslim-majority countries.

=== After the speech ===
After the speech, Obama visited Buchenwald concentration camp to pay homage to the victims of the Holocaust. He met German Chancellor Angela Merkel in Dresden on 5 June.

== Reaction ==
The speech was highly anticipated and generally acclaimed by the Muslim world. However, some Muslims criticized it, both before and after it was delivered.

=== Pre-speech ===
On 3 June, Al-Qaeda released a video in which Osama bin Laden strongly criticized Obama's foreign policy in the Middle East. He said that Obama "has followed the steps of his predecessor in antagonising Muslims ... and laying the foundation for long wars". He also added that "Obama and his administration have sowed new seeds of hatred against America." One day before, a video of Al-Qaeda number two Ayman al-Zawahiri was posted to extremist websites, in which al-Zawahiri criticized Obama's policy, declaring "his bloody messages were received and are still being received by Muslims, and they will not be concealed by public relations campaigns or by farcical visits or elegant words."

President Obama was also criticized by Ayatollah Ali Khamenei, who delivered a speech to mark the 20th anniversary of the death of Ayatollah Ruhollah Khomeini a few hours before Obama's speech. Khamenei commented on the pending speech declaring: "The nations of this part of the world ... deeply hate America. Even if they give sweet and beautiful [speeches] to the Muslim nation that will not create change. Action is needed."

=== Post-speech ===
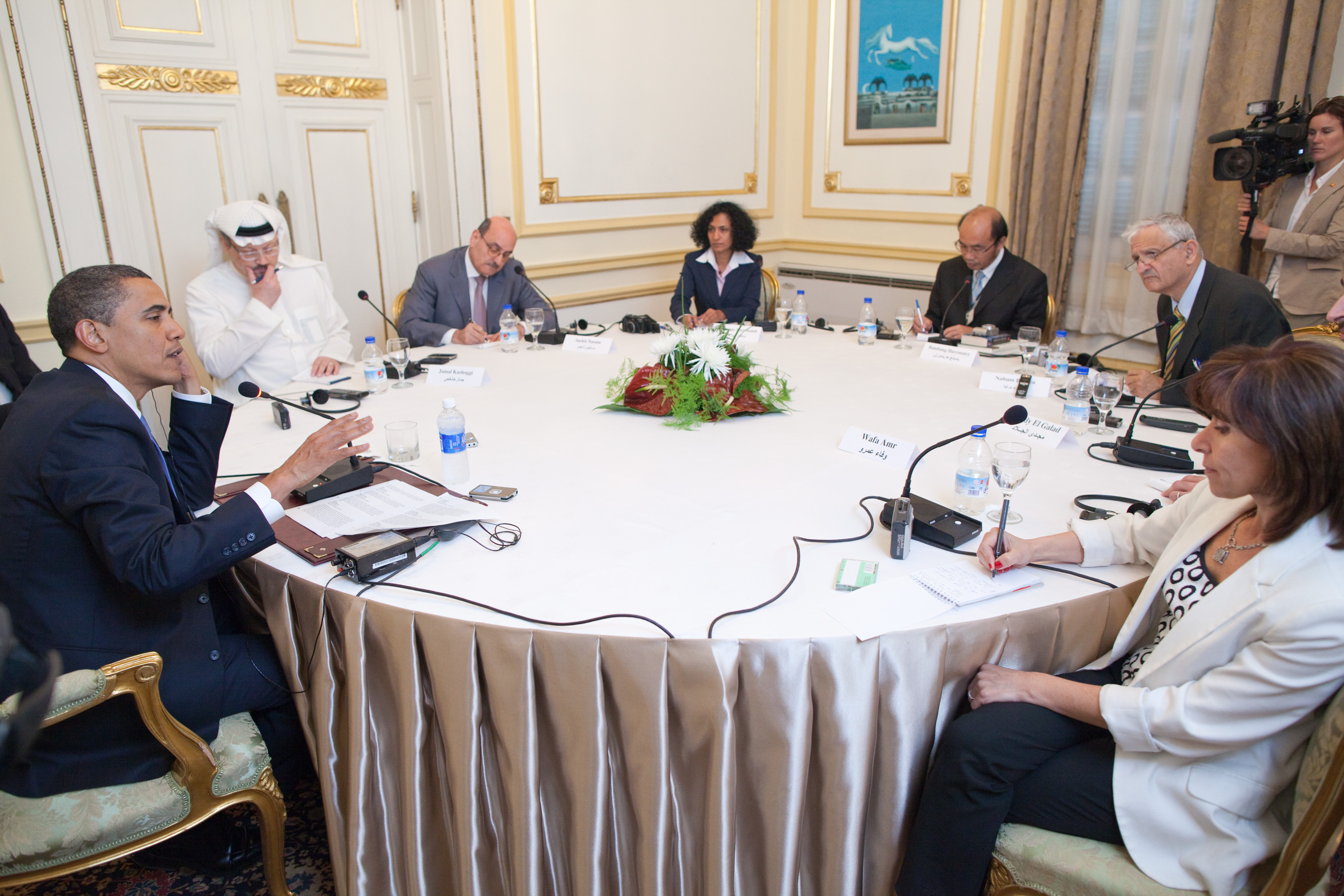
On 4 June 2009, after his speech A New Beginning, Obama participates in a roundtable interview with among others Jamal Khashoggi, Bambang Harymurti and Nahum Barnea.

Palestinian Authority President Mahmoud Abbas described the speech as "clear and frank... an innovative political step". Hamas spokesman Fawzi Barhum also welcomed the speech, saying "It had many contradictions, all the while reflecting tangible change." However, another Hamas spokesman, Ayman Taha, remarked after the speech that Obama is "no different" from George W. Bush. Amr Moussa, head of the Arab League, hailed the speech, saying it "was balanced and offered a new vision of rapprochement regarding relations with Islamic states".

Israeli Defense Minister Ehud Barak said the speech was a "direct, significant and brave appeal in which President Obama elucidated his vision and important universal principles, which he wishes to share with the Muslim world". Israeli President Shimon Peres said the speech was "full of vision, a brave speech demanding a commitment to hard work on all sides involved in the promotion of the peace process in the Middle East.... The idea of peace was born in the Middle East as the basis of the three monotheistic religions – Christianity, Judaism and Islam – and the sons of Abraham must join hands in order to take on this challenge together, a sustainable peace in the Middle East." Other government officials criticized the speech for what they saw as glossing over Palestinian terrorism. Science and Technology Minister Daniel Hershkowitz said, "Obama completely overlooked the fact that the Palestinians have yet to abandon terror. The Israeli government is not some overlapping excess of the US administration."

Javier Solana, European Union Common Foreign and Security Policy chief, praised the speech saying "It was a remarkable speech, a speech that without any doubt is going to open a new page in the relation with the Arab-Muslim world and I hope in the problems we have in so many theatres in the region." United Nations Secretary General Ban Ki-moon spoke of "the opening of a new chapter in relations between the United States and the Islamic world". The Vatican also welcomed the speech, saying it "went beyond political formulas, evoking concrete common interests in the name of a common humanity".

A Pakistan Foreign Office spokesman praised and backed the speech saying, "We feel encouraged by President Obama’s remarks on Palestine and Israel. It has been a long standing demand of Pakistan that the two-nation theory is the only way forward out of the Middle East crisis". He further went on to say, "We see this visit as a very positive step on the part of US because over the years there has been proverbial chasm between the Western and Islamic world. So this visit will be useful in bridging gaps between the Muslim and the Western world." An Iraqi government spokesperson stated that the speech made a "positive direction" towards international dialogue.

Hezbollah political figure Hassan Fadlallah remarked, "[t]he Islamic and Arab world does not need lectures". Ayatollah Ali Khamenei, the Supreme Leader of Iran, later made an address that did not mention Obama's speech directly, but he said, "[t]he new US government seeks to transform this image. I say firmly, that this will not be achieved by talking, speech and slogans". Iraqi Shiite cleric Moqtada al-Sadr also criticized it.

According to journalist Richard Spencer, most commentators in the Arab press welcomed Obama's speech, hoping it would lay the ground for concrete action. Christiane Amanpour of CNN has also described the Muslim world's general reaction as very favorable and supportive. Many Muslim clerics in Indonesia, such as those in the Indonesian Ulema Council, praised the speech and stated that it reflected America's good intentions towards Muslims. Salahuddin Wahid, an influential cleric, expressed hope that it would not be just words, but rather followed by "concrete steps". An Egyptian Salafi scholar responded positively to Obama's address and used it as an opportunity to explain the link between Islamic civilisation, European civilisation and America, and Islamic principles.

Some Arab commentators had a more negative response. Rami Khouri, the editor of The Daily Star and director of the Issam Fares Institute at the American University of Beirut, argued that Obama gave "a lot of good, positive vibes" but, ultimately, it "was only rhetoric". He referred to what he saw as the hypocrisy of Obama praising human rights after meeting with Egyptian and Saudi leaders who have suppressed those same rights. He stated that the Muslim world is still waiting for Obama's words to "translate" into real policy. Al Jazeera bureau chief Abderrahim Foukara made similar remarks, saying, "he talked about Palestinians killing Israelis, but he didn't talk a lot about Israelis killing Palestinians, especially in the context of the latest Israeli war on Gaza." Foukara also said, "he's come to us with his message of peace, but there are US forces in Afghanistan and Pakistan, and there are civilians being killed there by American forces."

The fact that Obama never mentioned the word "terrorism" or "terror" was positively interpreted by many in the Muslim street, given that many of them see a 'war on terror' interchangeably as a 'war on Islam'. American conservatives picked up on this, arguing that it weakened Obama's overall message. House Republican leader John Boehner also commented after the speech that Obama "seemed to place equal blame on the Israelis and the Palestinians.... I have concerns about that because Hamas is a terrorist organisation". As well, he said, "[w]here he continues to say he will sit down with the Iranians without any preconditions, I just think that that puts us in a position where America looks weak in the eyes of their rulers."

CNN pundit David Gergen argued that while, in his view, Obama has wrongly apologized for American actions before, he did not do so here and conservative criticisms are unfounded. Independent Senator Joseph Lieberman lauded the speech and went on to remark, "Obama is off to a very, very good start in a very difficult time in our nation's history." A spokesman for Human Rights Watch stated that "there were many things that were commendable ... but it is disappointing that when he talked about democracy in the Muslim world he wasn't more specific about some of the problems." He also stated that Obama refrained from talking about what the spokesman saw as the suppression of dissidents in Egypt.

=== Political effects ===
Following the speech, Essam Derbala, a leader of the Egyptian Islamist group al-Gama'a al-Islamiyya, called for Taliban and Al-Qaeda to halt attacks on US civilians and to consider the "opening" offered by Obama. He added that the organizations should also open up to talks with the United States. Egypt's Muslim Brotherhood dismissed the speech as being a public relations effort.

Three days after the speech, a strengthening of the pro-Western coalition in the Lebanese general election with a loss for Hezbollah was perceived by some foreign policy analysts to be at least in part due to Obama's speech. Several others stated that the speech played only a minor role compared to domestic events such as a last-minute appeal by Lebanon's Maronite patriarch asking Christians to vote against Hezbollah. For example, Lydia Khalil of the Council on Foreign Relations commented that "[i]t is too soon to tell what the ultimate Obama effect will be."

Israeli Prime Minister Benjamin Netanyahu immediately called a special government meeting after Obama finished his address. Yedioth Ahronoth has stated that the address' words "resonated through Jerusalem's corridors". On 14 June, Netanyahu gave a speech at Bar-Ilan University in which he endorsed, for the first time, a two-state solution for Israelis and Palestinians; the speech was widely seen as a response to Obama's speech. In a rejoinder to Obama's mentioning of the founding of Israel in the context of the Holocaust, Netanyahu remarked, "[t]here are those who say that if the Holocaust had not occurred, the State of Israel would never have been established. But I say that if the State of Israel would have been established earlier, the Holocaust would not have occurred." Netanyahu stated that he would accept a Palestinian state if Jerusalem were to remain the united capital of Israel, the Palestinians would have no army, and the Palestinians would give up their demand for a right of return. He also stated that existing Jewish settlements in the West Bank will expand while their permanent status is up to further negotiation. The overture was quickly rejected by Palestinian leaders such as Hamas spokesman Sami Abu Zuhri, who called the speech "racist".

According to the San Francisco Chronicle, the speech may have played some role in the June 2009 Iranian Presidential election between President Mahmoud Ahmadinejad and his rival Mir Hossein Mousavi, spurring on reformist public opinion. The paper also stated that the Obama administration would probably be loath to talk about this publicly in fear of sparking an Iranian backlash. About a week later, some unnamed Obama administration officials did make that case to The Washington Post.

== Follow-up speeches and legacy ==
A follow-up to the New Beginning speech was delivered by Barack Obama on 9 November 2010 at the University of Indonesia in Indonesia. The US president told the students at the university: "We can choose to be defined by our differences, and give in to a future of suspicion and mistrust. Or we can choose to do the hard work of forging common ground, and commit ourselves to the steady pursuit of progress." A second follow up speech, in which the same advisers who were involved in the New Beginning speech had a say, was delivered by US President Obama on 19 May 2011 at the US State Department in the wake of the Arab Spring uprisings in the Middle East. The speech was dubbed by John Esposito, Professor of religion, international affairs and Islamic studies at the Prince Alwaleed bin Talal Center for Muslim–Christian Understanding, Georgetown University as a good start in improving US–Muslim-world relations, but "as post Cairo so today, many will now be expecting bold and decisive policies and actions that turn the administration's rhetoric into reality."

In 2016 Obama stated in an interview with The Atlantic that he tried with his speech to persuade Muslims to more closely examine the roots of their unhappiness and acknowledged he didn't succeed in this goal. "My argument was this: Let’s all stop pretending that the cause of the Middle East’s problems is Israel. We want to work to help achieve statehood and dignity for the Palestinians, but I was hoping that my speech could trigger a discussion, could create space for Muslims to address the real problems they are confronting—problems of governance, and the fact that some currents of Islam have not gone through a reformation that would help people adapt their religious doctrines to modernity. My thought was, I would communicate that the US is not standing in the way of this progress, that we would help, in whatever way possible, to advance the goals of a practical, successful Arab agenda that provided a better life for ordinary people."

== See also ==
- Partners for a New Beginning
- Rashad Hussain
- Presidential Summit on Entrepreneurship
