= Oakley-Lindsay Center =

Convention center in Illinois

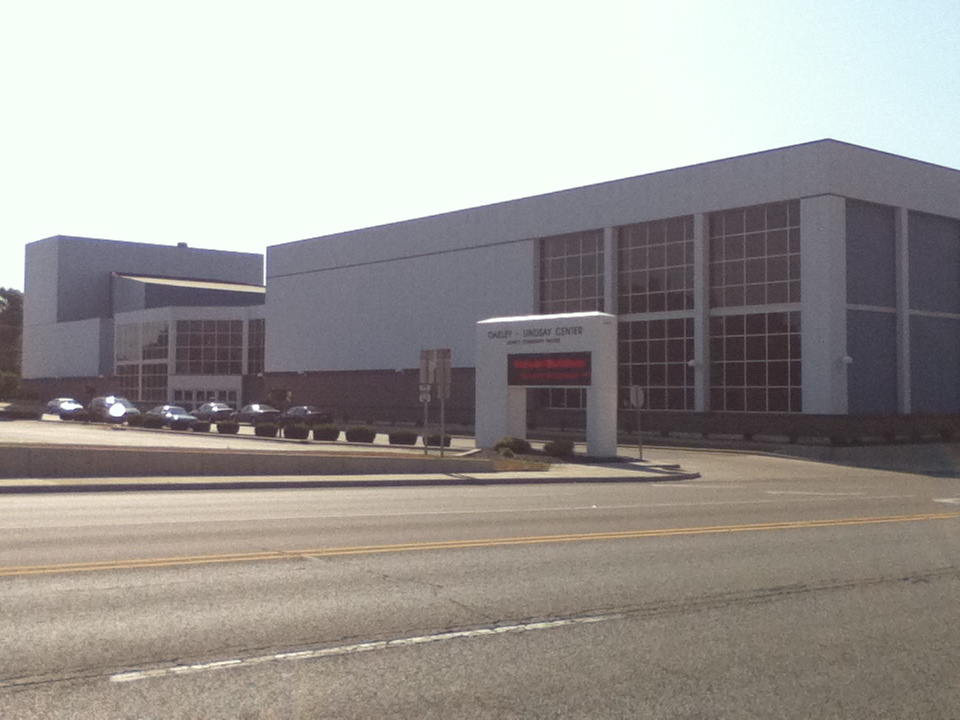
- Interactive map of Oakley-Lindsay Center
- Location: 300 Civic Center Plaza, Quincy, Illinois, United States
- Coordinates: 39.9284°N 91.4109°W
- Public transit: Quincy Transit Lines

Construction
- Opened: 1995

Website
- www.quincyciviccenter.com

The Oakley-Lindsay Center is the regional convention center for Quincy, Illinois and the tri-state region. It opened in 1995 at a cost of $8 million. It serves as the convention hub of the Quincy micropolitan area and fills the market in-between St. Louis and Iowa City.

The center served as a sandbagging focal point during the Flood of 2008 with over 1 million sandbags filled. The Oakley-Lindsay Center and the sandbagging effort was featured on many news organizations and even had a visit from then-presidential candidate Barack Obama (D-IL) on Saturday, June 14.

== Location ==
The convention center is located just south of downtown Quincy along Gardner Expressway (Illinois Route 57) and is 3 blocks from the Mississippi River. Many of Quincy's historic landmarks lie within walking distance of the facility including the Villa Kathrine, many hotels, downtown, and many parks lining the river.

== Facilities ==
=== McClain-Kent Hall ===
The McClain-Kent Hall is the largest space of the convention complex holding up to 30,000 square feet (2,800 m^{2}). The hall's capacity is 3,500 people and it houses concerts, plus many other larger events of the tri-states, such as the annual WGEM Home & Living Show.

=== Oakley and Lindsay Rooms ===
The Oakley and Lindsay Rooms are rooms that house small groups of people. They are designed for seminars, workshops, and conferences.

=== Quincy Community Theater ===
Oakley-Lindsay Center also houses the Quincy Community Theater, which is a 500-seat state-of-the-art theater that puts on many shows throughout the year.

== Events ==
Popular events at the OLC have included receptions, proms, boxing events, rodeo, and also concerts.

=== Concert Portfolio ===
- Destiny's Child - 2000
- Diamond Rio - December 7, 2002
- Skillet • October 25, 2011

=== Other Notable Events ===
- President Barack Obama's "White House to Main Street" Tour • April 28, 2010

== See also ==
- List of convention centers in the United States
