= Partners for a New Beginning =

- Abbreviation: PNB
- Type: Public-Private Partnership
- Headquarters: Washington, DC
- Website: http://www.partnersforanewbeginning.org/

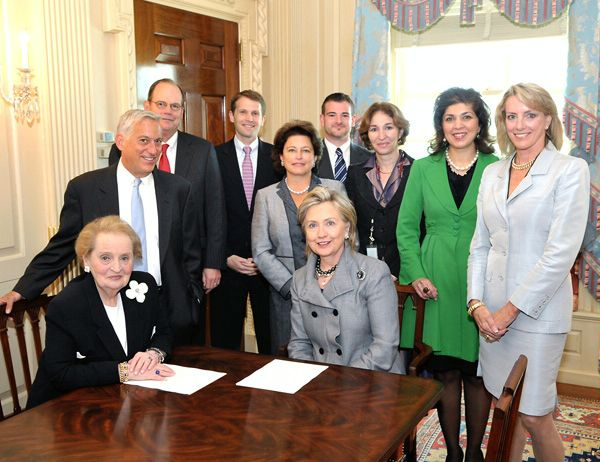
Secretary Clinton Announces Partners for A New Beginning with Former Secretary of State Madeleine Albright, Walter Isaacson, and Barclay Resler at the U.S. Department of State, Washington, DC, April 27, 2010.

In his "A New Beginning" speech on June 4, 2009, at Cairo University in Cairo, Egypt, President of the United States Barack Obama stated "I've come here to Cairo to seek a new beginning between the United States and Muslims around the world, one based on mutual interest and mutual respect, and one based upon the truth that America and Islam are not exclusive and need not be in competition. Instead, they overlap and share common principles – principles of justice and progress; tolerance and the dignity of all human beings." During the speech, he also committed to "host a Summit on Entrepreneurship this year to identify how we can deepen ties between business leaders, foundations and social entrepreneurs in the United States and Muslim communities around the world".

To support the President's "New Beginning" goals, United States Secretary of State Hillary Clinton launched Partners for a New Beginning along with former Secretary of State Madeleine Albright, Walter Isaacson (President of The Aspen Institute), and Muhtar Kent (chairman and CEO of The Coca-Cola Company) on April 27, 2010. Leading the initiative on the State Department side is Kris Balderston, Special Representative for Global Partnerships.

== Background ==
In an official signing ceremony in conjunction with the Presidential Summit on Entrepreneurship on April 27, 2010, the U.S. Department of State entered into a partnership with Partners for a New Beginning (PNB) - a group of eminent Americans from a variety of sectors who will reach out systematically to private sector entities at the highest level to harness private sector resources and capabilities to advance New Beginning programs and goals. This partnership was officially announced during Secretary Clinton's remarks at the close of the Presidential Summit on Entrepreneurship.

As Secretary Clinton explained at the Presidential Summit on Entrepreneurship, "For example, they might reach out to companies to provide equipment and technology for the Scientific Centers of Excellence overseas, or help launch internships and mentoring programs for emerging business leaders, or encourage angel investors in this country to partner with angel investors abroad. Through collaborations like these, Partners for a New Beginning will deepen ties between our people and institutions, and give more Americans the chance to contribute to this common endeavor."

== Steering committee members ==
On September 22, 2010, PNB inaugurated the full PNB Steering Committee and announced the following commitment:

Partners for a New Beginning (PNB) commits to broaden and deepen engagement between the U.S. and international Muslim communities by building public-private partnerships that advance economic opportunity, science and technology, education, and exchange. Over the next five years, these partnerships will increase access to financing, business capacity and development services, improve educational opportunities for students and teachers, foster physical and virtual exchange programs, and enhance science and technology solutions that will positively impact up to 500,000 people across PNB targeted countries.

Video from the Clinton Global Initiative Commitment: https://www.youtube.com/watch?v=Fqlfb9QsD98

PNB is chaired by Madeleine K. Albright, chair of Albright Stonebridge Group, and she is joined by PNB Vice Chairs Muhtar Kent, chairman and CEO of the Coca-Cola Company, and Walter Isaacson, president and CEO of the Aspen Institute. The PNB Steering Committee members are as follows:

- Tarek Abdel-Meguid, founding partner, Parella Weinberg Partners
- David Arkless, president of global corporate and government affairs, ManpowerGroup
- Jean Case, chief executive officer, The Case Foundation
- John Chambers, chairman and CEO, Cisco.
- Kenneth Cohen, chairman, ExxonMobil Foundation; vice president of public affairs, ExxonMobil
- Henrietta H. Fore, chairman and CEO, Holsman International
- Helene Gayle, president and CEO, CARE USA
- Stephen B. Heintz, president, Rockefeller Brothers Fund
- Andrew Liveris, president, chairman, and CEO, Dow Chemical Company
- John Mack, former chairman and CEO, Morgan Stanley
- Christopher J. Nassetta, president and CEO, Hilton Worldwide
- Paul Otellini, president and CEO, Intel Corporation
- Eboo Patel, founder and executive director, Interfaith Youth Core
- Ruth Simmons, president, Brown University

== Members at Large ==
On Tuesday, May 31, 2011, the Aspen Institute announced the following members at large – organizations committed to working with other partners and PNB Local Chapters to carry out targeted and set revenue-generating and/or philanthropic commitments for the benefit of Muslim communities in PNB targeted countries.

Members at large include:

- The Arab American Institute
- Bamyan Media
- Craig Newmark
- IBM
- International Youth Foundation and The MasterCard Foundation
- New York Academy of Sciences
- PeacePlayers International
- Sawari Ventures
- Souktel
- SREN
- Tanenbaum Center for Interreligious Understanding
- Tomorrow's Youth Organization
- Tony Blair Faith Foundation
- Turkish Philanthropy Funds
- University of the People
- WillowTree Impact Investors
- World Cocoa Foundation
- World Congress of Muslim Philanthropists

== Statement of support ==
President Obama: "Many of the partnerships I’ve mentioned are a direct result of my call in Cairo for a new beginning between the United States and Muslim communities around the world. And it involves the private sector as well, thanks to efforts like Partners for a New Beginning, which is forging partnerships around science, education and entrepreneurship." –during his visit to Jakarta, Indonesia, on November 9, 2010.

== See also ==
- E-Mentor Corps and ImagineNations Group
- Presidential Summit on Entrepreneurship
- Aspen Institute
