= Presidential Summit on Entrepreneurship =

Presidential Summit on Entrepreneurship

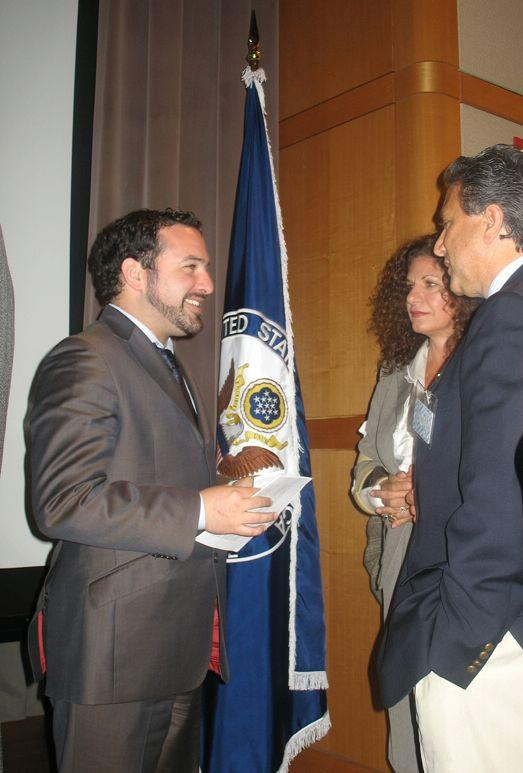
Entrepreneurship Summit Town Hall participants with speaker Ari Alexander

In his "A New Beginning" speech on June 4, 2009, at Cairo University in Cairo, Egypt, President of the United States Barack Obama announced, "I will host a Summit on Entrepreneurship this year to identify how we can deepen ties between business leaders, foundations and social entrepreneurs in the United States and Muslim communities around the world".

The Presidential Summit on Entrepreneurship, held in Washington, D.C., on Monday April 26, and Tuesday, April 27, 2010, at the Ronald Reagan Building, followed through on President Obama's commitment by highlighting the importance of social and economic entrepreneurship, and strengthening mutually-beneficial relationships with entrepreneurs in Muslim-majority countries and Muslim communities around the world. At the second summit in Istanbul, Turkey, Vice President Joe Biden announced that the Presidential Summit would become the marquee event that kicks off Global Entrepreneurship Week each year, with the 2013 host being the United Arab Emirates.

== Summit participants ==
Participants were selected from around the world to represent their home countries, regions, and sectors at the summit. They hailed from over fifty countries on five continents and include successful entrepreneurs, investors, academics, and leaders of entrepreneurship networks, non-profit organizations, foundations, and businesses who are invested in promoting entrepreneurship.

Participants hailed from: Afghanistan, Albania, Algeria, Australia, Austria, Bahrain, Bangladesh, Brazil, Brunei, Cameroon, Canada, China, Denmark, Djibouti, Egypt, Finland, France, Gambia, Germany, India, Indonesia, Iraq, Israel, Jordan, Kazakhstan, Kenya, Kosovo, Kuwait, Kyrgyz, Lebanon, Libya, Madagascar, Malaysia, Mauritania, Morocco, Netherlands, Niger, Nigeria, Norway, Oman, Pakistan, the Palestinian Territories, Paraguay, the Philippines, Qatar, Russia, Saudi Arabia, Somalia, Spain, Sweden, Syria, Tajikistan, Tunisia, Turkey, UAE, Uganda, United Kingdom, the United States, and Yemen.

== Briefings and remarks ==
Below are videos of briefings and remarks of participants in the Presidential Summit on Entrepreneurship, Washington, DC, April 26–27, 2010.

- Barack Obama, President of the United States
- Hillary Clinton, United States Secretary of State
- Gary Locke, United States Secretary of Commerce
- Rajiv Shah, USAID Administrator
- Karen Mills, Administrator, U.S. Small Business Administration
- Rashad Hussein, Special Envoy to the Organisation of the Islamic Conference
- Farah Pandith, Special Representative to Muslim Communities
- Pradeep Ramamurthy, Senior Director for Global Engagement, National Security Staff
- Larry Summers, Director of the National Economic Council and Assistant to the President for Economic Policy
- Jerry Yang, co-founder and former CEO of Yahoo! Inc.

A town hall hosted by the U.S. Department of State on April 28 also featured remarks by Special Representative to Muslim Communities Farah Pandith and Special Envoy to the Organisation of the Islamic Conference Rashad Hussain, as well as E-Summit delegate Asim Siddiqui, a community organizer from the UK. A panel discussion on cultivating grassroots partnerships followed, including Shelly Porges from the Bureau of Economic, Energy and Business Affairs, Rob Lalka from the Global Partnership Initiative, and Ari Alexander from USAID’s Center for Faith-Based and Community Initiatives.

== Announcements ==
- Global Entrepreneurship Program
- Partners for a New Beginning
- E-Mentor Corps
- Exchange Programs focused on Entrepreneurship, Innovation, and Science
- Silicon Valley Partnership: Global Technology and Innovation Partners
- Silicon Valley Partnership: The Innovators Fund

== Partner events ==
In addition to the official events for the Presidential Summit, over thirty partner organizations invited participants to outside events, highlighting how the President and the US Government have helped catalyze a long-term, sustainable conversation on entrepreneurship. During recent months, the State Department coordinated with outside organizations on these related but independent events.

Events during the week of the Summit on Entrepreneurship included:

- Roundtable discussions hosted by the Acumen Fund, Endeavor, the Brookings Institution, and the World Congress of Muslim Philanthropists;
- Conferences hosted by the Middle East Center on International Cooperation, Vital Voices, the Center for the Study of Islam and Democracy, and the International Council for Small Business;
- Receptions hosted by the Kauffman Foundation and Businesses for Diplomatic Action / Entrepreneurs' Organization;
- Public Diplomacy Luncheon and Professional Networking events hosted by Al-Mubadarah: Arab Empowerment Initiative in collaboration with Aspen Institute's Global Initiative on Culture and Society and
- Video screenings of Ten9Eight at the Library of Congress and Garbage Dreams at the World Bank.
- The Global Technology Forum 2010, hosted by TechWadi, focused on building bridges between the US and MENA to accelerate entrepreneurship.

In addition, the US Government hosted special events for delegates, including briefings on business development by the US Small Business Administration, an economic support roundtable at the US Trade and Development Agency, and a reception hosted by the State Department for delegates with the Ambassadors to the United States from delegates’ home countries.

The US Government released an interactive Google map with detailed information on each of these events, which was embedded on several websites.

== Follow-on conferences ==
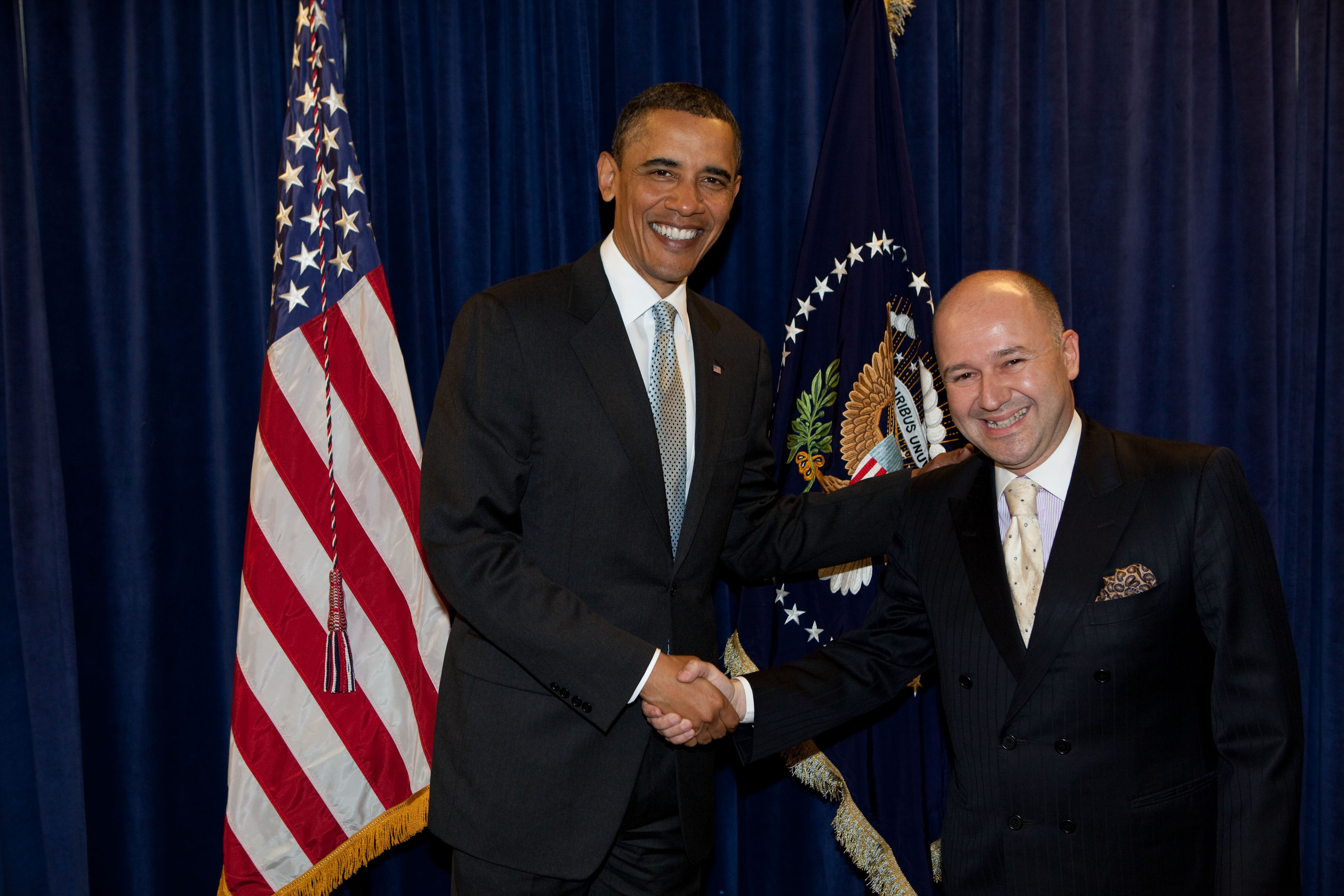
President Obama greets Baybars Altuntas of Turkey at the Presidential Summit on Entrepreneurship. President Obama announced in his speech that Prime Minister Erdogan and Turkey will host the next Entrepreneurship Summit in 2011. (official White House photo by Pete Souza)

Several overseas institutions and partners expressed interest in hosting Follow-on Conferences to continue to advance the mission of the Entrepreneurship Summit beyond the April 26 and 27 Presidential Summit in Washington. These Follow-on Conferences would be locally or regionally focused and would focus on a specific element of advancing entrepreneurship (e.g. youth entrepreneurship, access to capital, etc.) We have told these partners that we want to be supportive of these events and acknowledge them at the Summit. We have said that we would attempt to have an appropriate USG official attend, but that we would not play any role in organizing them and would not expect to provide any funding assistance.

These Conferences have been initiated by partners who are heeding the President's call to shared action and responsibility. Through their initiative, they will help to advance what the United States and its partners on the Presidential Summit on Entrepreneurship have started. We have received Statements of Intent for the following Follow-on Conferences:

- UAE/Abu Dhabi: The Aspen Institute and the government of the UAE will host a Conference in Abu Dhabi in June 2010 on Innovation.
- Iraq: The American University of Iraq-Sulaimani will host a conference on Social Entrepreneurship in Sulaimani, Iraq in Spring 2011.
- Algeria: The U.S.-Algerian Business Council will host a Conference in Algeria on entrepreneurship in the Maghreb in September 2010.
- Bahrain: The government of Bahrain will host a Conference on innovation, investment and entrepreneurship in December 2010.
- France: The French-American Foundation has committed to host a Conference on youth entrepreneurship in disadvantaged communities late in 2010 or early in 2011.
- Kyrgyzstan: The American University of Central Asia, with some Department of State support, will host a Conference on Women Entrepreneurship in Bishkek in May 2010.
- UAE/Dubai: The Legatum Institute at MIT and the Dubai School of Government hosted a Conference in Dubai on “Best Practices in Entrepreneurship Policy” in November 2010.

Prime Minister of Turkey Recep Tayyip Erdoğan sent a letter to Obama with Deulcom International's CEO Baybars Altuntaş during the summit, proposing to hold the next Entrepreneurship Summit in Istanbul. During his remarks, President Obama embraced the proposal and stated that "Together, we’ve sparked a new era of entrepreneurship -- with events all over Washington this week, and upcoming regional conferences around the world. Tonight, I am pleased to announce that Prime Minister Erdogan has agreed to host the next Entrepreneurship Summit next year in Turkey. And so I thank the Prime Minister and the people and private sector leaders of Turkey for helping to sustain the momentum that we will unleash this week."
