= ImagineNations Group =

ImagineNations Group is a global social enterprise focused on inspiring and developing practical strategies that change the odds for people where they work, live and learn. With its expansive network of entrepreneurial partners, leaders, investors, philanthropists and organizations, ImagineNations is helping to bridge deep divides and address complex, large-scale challenges through its role as a catalyst and facilitator of ideas, networks, people and resources.

== Board of directors ==
ImagineNations' board of directors includes ImagineNations Group founder & CEO Rick Little; chairman Jacob Schimmel (chairman, UKI Investments); ImagineNations Group managing director Alan Fleischmann; former chairman of the Financial Times Sir David Bell; bestselling author and former Smith College president Jill Ker Conway; MercyCorps CEO Neal Keny-Guyer; Harvard University's Jane Nelson; Zambian diplomat and activist Dr. Inonge Lewanika; and former Finnish president and 2008 Nobel Peace Prize recipient Martti Ahtisaari.

== Awards ==
ImagineNations Group was awarded the 2008 Goodwin Award for its work around the globe. The award was presented by Nobel Prize–winning economist Joseph Stiglitz in Siena, Italy.
