= Winston Churchill's address to Congress =

Winston Churchill's address to Congress may refer to:

- Winston Churchill's address to Congress (1941)
- Winston Churchill's address to Congress (1943)
- Winston Churchill's address to Congress (1952)
