= Belinda Mason =

American AIDS activist

- Born: Belinda Ann Mason; July 2, 1958; Whitesburg, Kentucky, U.S.
- Died: September 9, 1991 (aged 33); Nashville, Tennessee, U.S.
- Resting place: Utica, Kentucky, U.S.
- Parents: Paul Mason (father); Barbara McIntyre (mother)

Belinda Ann Mason (July 2, 1958 – September 9, 1991) was an American AIDS activist, policy advisor, and writer based in rural Kentucky. She was the first person with AIDS appointed to the U.S. National Commission on AIDS. Mason contracted AIDS in 1987 from a contaminated blood transfusion while giving birth.

== Early life and diagnosis ==
Mason was born in Letcher County, Kentucky, in 1958. She was the daughter of state representative Paul Mason and Barbara McIntyre. She attended the University of Kentucky, graduating in 1980 with a bachelor's degree in journalism. Over the following seven years, she worked as a reporter for two newspapers, the Ohio County Times-News in Hartford and the Appalachian News-Express in Pikeville, and began writing fiction. Her short stories were published in The American Voice and Appalachian Review. Mason also wrote several plays, one of which was produced by Appalshop's Roadside Theater.

On January 17, 1987, Mason required a blood transfusion while giving birth to her second child, Clayton, at Regional Medical Center of Hopkins County. Some of the blood she received had not been previously tested; subsequent analysis revealed that it was contaminated with AIDS, and Mason tested positive for AIDS soon after leaving the hospital.

Mason and her husband, Steve Carden, sued Regional Medical Center of Hopkins County and won an out-of-court settlement.

== Activism ==
Following her diagnosis, Mason traveled throughout the United States speaking about her experience with AIDS and the importance of HIV prevention education.

Mason cofounded the Kentuckiana People with AIDS Coalition (KIPWAC), the first organization for people with AIDS from Kentucky and Indiana, with Ron Jerrell in August 1988. She served a one-year term as president of KIPWAC and remained the chair emeritus of its board of directors until her death.

In 1988, Mason became president of the National Association of People with AIDS. She also served as director of the Washington, D.C. lobbying coalition AIDS Action Council.

Mason testified before the U.S. Senate as part of a joint congressional hearing on the Americans with Disabilities Act in September 1988 ultimately contributing to the legislation's passage in 1990.

President George H. W. Bush appointed Mason to the National Commission on AIDS in July 1989; she was the first person with AIDS ever to serve on the commission. During her tenure, Mason was an outspoken critic of the Bush administration's AIDS policy, accusing Bush of "treating AIDS as a moral issue rather than as a public-health issue". She vocally opposed mandatory HIV testing for medical workers and bans on people with AIDS entering the United States, two policies popular with the administration at the time, and urged the U.S. Food and Drug Administration to approve AIDS drugs other than AZT.

== Death and legacy ==
Mason's health began to fail in early 1991, leading her to seek care at Vanderbilt University Medical Center. She died there of AIDS-related pneumonia on September 9, 1991, at the age of 33. Her seat on the National Commission on AIDS was filled by basketball player Magic Johnson.

Appalshop produced a documentary about Mason's activism, Belinda, during the final year of her life. Belinda was released in 1992 and won the CINE Golden Eagle Award.

Western Kentucky University annually awards the Ron Jerrell and Belinda Mason Scholarship to a journalism student affected by HIV.
