= Deskins =

Deskins is a surname. Notable people with this surname include:

- Dawne Deskins (fl. 1984 – present), an American major general
- Donald R. Deskins Jr. (1932–2013), an American football player and urban studies professor
- Herbert Deskins (born 1943), an American state politician from Kentucky

== See also ==
- Deskin, a similarly spelled given name and surname
