= Paul Mason (Kentucky politician) =

American politician

Member of the Kentucky House of Representatives from the 91st district
- In office January 1, 1987 – December 8, 1998
- Preceded by: Hoover Dawahare
- Succeeded by: Howard Cornett

Personal details
- Born: July 5, 1935 Letcher County, Kentucky, U.S.
- Died: December 7, 1998 (aged 63) Boston, Massachusetts, U.S.
- Party: Democratic
- Children: 3, including Belinda

Paul Mason (July 5, 1935 – December 7, 1998) was an American politician and activist who served in the Kentucky House of Representatives from the 91st district from 1987 until his death in 1998. He was a member of the Democratic Party.

== Political career ==
In 1986, incumbent representative, Hoover Dawahare, decided not to run for another term in the Kentucky House of Representatives. Mason, a used car dealer from Whitesburg, Kentucky, entered the race for representative. His opponent was James W. Craft. The election was held on November 4, 1986. Mason defeated Craft, taking 4,727 votes compared to Crafts 4,553 votes. As a result, Craft asked the Kentucky House of Representatives to overturn the election results, but Craft would later withdraw the petition. Mason assumed office in early 1987.

On January 17, 1987, his daughter, Belinda Mason, was given a blood transfusion while giving birth to her second child. The blood that she received had not been previously tested, and a subsequent analysis revealed that it was contaminated with AIDS. On July 24, 1987, Mason, his daughter, and her husband, Steve Carden, sued Regional Medical Center of Hopkins County for US$10 Million, and won. On November 19, 1987, Mason presented a bill that would make transfusions of untested blood illegal, the bill also stated that knowingly donating AIDS contaminated blood would be a class D felony.

== Death ==
On November 30, 1998, Mason had surgery for a growth on his adrenal gland at Massachusetts General Hospital. While recovering in the hospital, on December 7, 1998, he suffered a Brain Aneurism, and subsequently died. His seat in the Kentucky House of Representatives was later filled by Howard Cornett.
