= Leslie A. Combs =

American politician

Leslie Combs

Member of the Kentucky House of Representatives from the 94th district
- In office January 1, 2007 – January 1, 2017
- Preceded by: Howard Cornett
- Succeeded by: Angie Hatton

Personal details
- Born: August 1, 1958 (age 68)
- Party: Democratic
- Education: Transylvania University

Leslie Combs is an American politician from the state of Kentucky. She represented the 94th district in the Kentucky House of Representatives from 2007 to 2017. She is a member of the Democratic Party. She retired from the house in 2016.

On January 7, 2014, Combs accidentally discharged her firearm in the Kentucky State Capitol while attempting to unload it.
