= Howard Cornett =

American politician

Member of the Kentucky House of Representatives
- In office March 1999 – January 1, 2007
- Preceded by: Paul Mason
- Succeeded by: Leslie A. Combs
- Constituency: 91st district (1999–2003); 94th district (2003–2007)

Personal details
- Born: March 11, 1953 (age 73) Harlan, Kentucky, U.S.
- Party: Republican
- Spouse: Jackie
- Children: 3

Howard Cornett (born March 11, 1953) is an American politician from Kentucky who was a member of the Kentucky House of Representatives from 1999 to 2007. Cornett was first elected in a March 1999 special election following the death of incumbent representative Paul Mason. In 2002 he was redistricted to the 94th district with incumbent Democratic representative Ira Branham, who chose not to seek reelection. He was defeated for reelection in 2006 by Democrat Leslie A. Combs.

Kentucky House of Representatives
Preceded by Paul Mason	Member of the Kentucky House of Representatives from the 91st district 1999–2003	Succeeded by Ted Edmonds
Preceded by Ira Branham	Member of the Kentucky House of Representatives from the 94th district 2003–2007	Succeeded by Leslie A. Combs
