= Ira Branham =

American politician

Member of the Kentucky House of Representatives from the 94th district
- In office January 1, 1999 – January 1, 2003
- Preceded by: Herbert Deskins
- Succeeded by: Howard Cornett (redistricting)

Personal details
- Party: Democratic

Ira Edsel Branham (born 1958) is an American politician from Kentucky who was a member of the Kentucky House of Representatives from 1999 to 2003. Branham was first elected in 1998 after incumbent representative Herbert Deskins retired. He did not seek reelection in 2002 when redistricting moved fellow incumbent Howard Cornett from the 91st to the 94th district.
