= Toby Herald =

American politician

Member of the Kentucky House of Representatives from the 91st district
- In office January 1, 2017 – January 1, 2019
- Preceded by: Cluster Howard
- Succeeded by: Cluster Howard
- In office January 1, 2013 – January 1, 2015
- Preceded by: Ted Edmonds
- Succeeded by: Cluster Howard

Personal details
- Born: July 4, 1953 (age 73)
- Party: Republican

Gary Wayne "Toby" Herald (born July 4, 1953) is an American politician who represented District 91 in the Kentucky House of Representatives from 2013 to 2015 and 2017 to 2019.

== Elections ==
- 2012 To challenge District 91 incumbent Democratic Representative Ted Edmonds, Herald was unopposed for the May 22, 2012 Republican Primary and won the November 6, 2012 General election with 6,332 votes (50.5%) against Representative Edmonds.
