= Joint session of the United States Congress =

Gathering of members of both houses of Congress

Leadership
- Speaker of the House: Mike Johnson (R) since October 25, 2023
- President of the Senate: JD Vance (R) since January 20, 2025

Structure
- Seats: 535 voting members: 100 senators; 435 representatives; 6 non-voting members
- Senate political groups: Republican (53); Democratic (45); Independent (2) (Note: The independent senators (Angus King, Bernie Sanders) formally caucus with the Democratic Party.)
- House of Representatives political groups: Republican (218); Democratic (215)

Meeting place
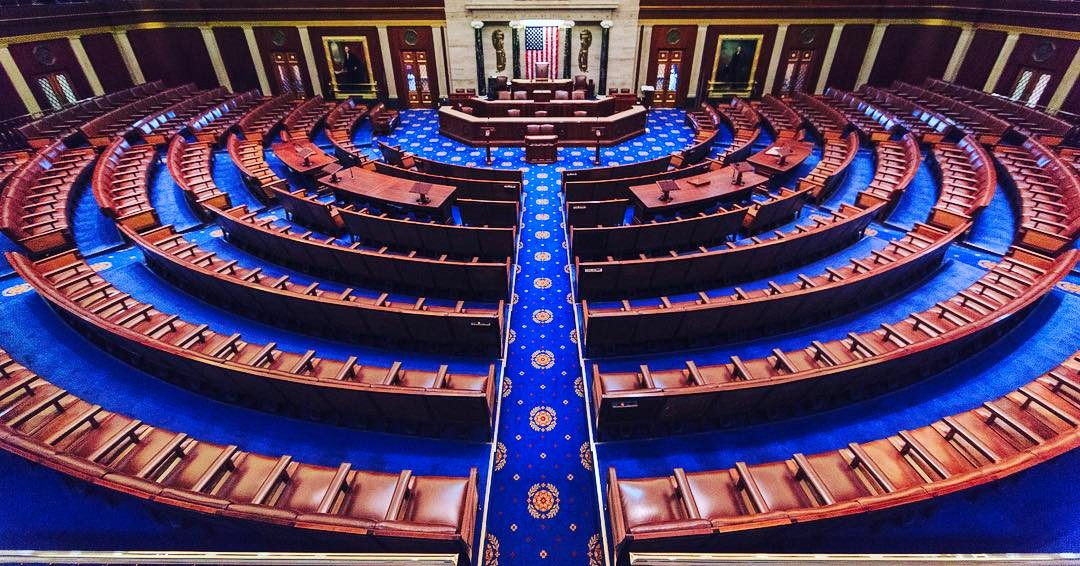
- House of Representatives Chamber, United States Capitol, Washington, D.C., United States

Constitution
- United States Constitution

A joint session of the United States Congress is a gathering of members of the two chambers of the bicameral legislature of the federal government of the United States: the Senate and the House of Representatives. Joint sessions can be held on any special occasion, but are customarily held when the president delivers a State of the Union address and are required when they gather to count and certify the votes of the Electoral College as the presidential election. A joint meeting is usually a ceremonial or formal occasion and does not perform any legislative function, and no resolution is proposed nor vote taken.

Joint sessions and meetings are usually held in the Chamber of the House of Representatives, and are traditionally presided over by the speaker of the House. The Constitution requires the vice president (as president of the Senate) to preside over the counting of electoral votes by Congress.

== Counting electoral votes ==
Since 1804, the Twelfth Amendment has provided that the president of the Senate receives the Electoral College votes and opens them in the presence of the Senate and House of Representatives, who count the votes. The Electoral Count Act of 1887 requires the votes to be counted during a joint session on January 6 following the meetings of the presidential electors. The act specifies that the president of the Senate presides over the session. The Twentieth Amendment now provides that the newly elected Congress counts the votes. Until 1936, the outgoing Congress counted the electoral votes.

The joint session to count electoral votes is held at 1:00 p.m. Eastern time on January 6 (except in 2021, when it was rescheduled to the following day due to the Capitol attack) in the Chamber of the House of Representatives. The sitting vice president is expected to preside. In several cases the president pro tempore of the Senate has chaired the proceedings instead. The vice president and the speaker of the House sit at the podium, with the vice president in the seat of the speaker of the House. Senate pages bring in the two mahogany boxes containing each state's certified vote and place them on tables in front of the senators and representatives.

Each chamber appoints two tellers to count the vote, normally one member of each political party. Relevant portions of the Certificate of Vote are read for each state, in alphabetical order. Members of Congress can object to any state's vote count, provided that the objection is supported by at least one fifth of the members of each house of Congress. A successful objection will be followed by separate debate and votes on the objection in each chamber of Congress. The successful vote by both chambers is required to toss out that state's vote count.

Objections to the electoral vote count are rarely raised. Only four have successfully occurred since the current procedure was implemented by the Electoral Count Act, two initiated by Democrats and two initiated by Republicans. The first was in 1969 regarding the vote of faithless elector Lloyd W. Bailey of North Carolina, who was pledged to vote for Richard Nixon but instead voted for George Wallace. The objection by Maine Senator Edmund Muskie and Michigan Representative James G. O'Hara was defeated. The second was in 2005, when Ohio Representative Stephanie Tubbs Jones joined with California Senator Barbara Boxer to object to the entire slate of electors from Ohio, following controversies regarding voting in the state during the 2004 United States presidential election. The objection was defeated by wide margins in the House and Senate.

The third and fourth occurred in 2021. For the third, Representative Paul Gosar of Arizona's 4th congressional district and Senator Ted Cruz of Texas successfully raised an objection to the certification of electoral votes from the election in Arizona. For the fourth, Representative Scott Perry (PA-10) and Senator Josh Hawley (Missouri) objected to Pennsylvania electoral vote certification. Both objections were defeated by large margins in the House and Senate, although over 125 Republicans voted for each objection. The third objection was interrupted by the 2021 United States Capitol attack, leading Senator Kelly Loeffler (Georgia) to withdraw her objection to Georgia electoral vote certification.

Notably, Democratic members of the House attempted unsuccessfully to object to the certification of electoral votes from the 2000 presidential election, with outgoing vice president and Democratic presidential candidate Al Gore overruling multiple objections to the controversial election count from Florida due to the lack of a senator signing on to any of them. In 2017, Democratic representatives attempted unsuccessfully to object to the electoral votes from multiple states after the 2016 presidential election.

If there are no objections or all objections are overruled, the presiding officer declares the result of the vote and states who is elected president and vice president. The senators then depart from the House Chamber.

== State of the Union ==
At some time during the first two months of each session, the president customarily delivers the State of the Union address, a speech in which an assessment is made of the state of the country, and the president's legislative agenda is outlined. The speech is modeled on the Speech from the Throne, given by the British monarch. The president is the principal author of his own State of the Union address, while the Speech from the Throne is customarily written by the prime minister.

The Constitution of the United States requires that the president "shall from time to time give to the Congress Information of the State of the Union," but does not specify whether the information should be given in a speech or a written report. The first two presidents, George Washington and John Adams, delivered the speech in person before both houses of Congress. That practice was discontinued by Thomas Jefferson, who considered it too monarchical and sent written reports instead. Written reports were standard until 1913, when Woodrow Wilson reestablished the practice of personally attending to deliver the speech. Since then, on a number of occasions presidents have presented a written report, usually for medical reasons.

== Subjects of joint sessions and meetings ==
Besides State of the Union addresses, inaugurals and counting of electoral votes, joint sessions or meetings usually fall into one of several topics.

=== Presidential addresses ===
In addition to a State of the Union address, presidents address Congress on specific subjects. The first such speech was delivered by John Adams on the subject of U.S. relations with France. The most popular subjects for such addresses are economic, military and foreign policy issues.

In addition to bringing back the tradition of delivering a State of the Union address, Woodrow Wilson was the first president since John Adams to address Congress on specific topics. He delivered 17 such speeches, more than any other president.

Newly inaugurated presidents may deliver an address to a joint session of Congress, similar to a State of the Union, shortly after they enter office; however, this speech is not considered an official "State of the Union".

=== Foreign dignitaries ===
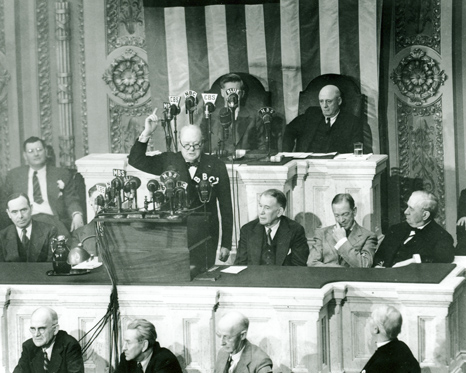
Winston Churchill addresses Congress in 1943. Sitting behind him Vice President Wallace and Speaker Rayburn.

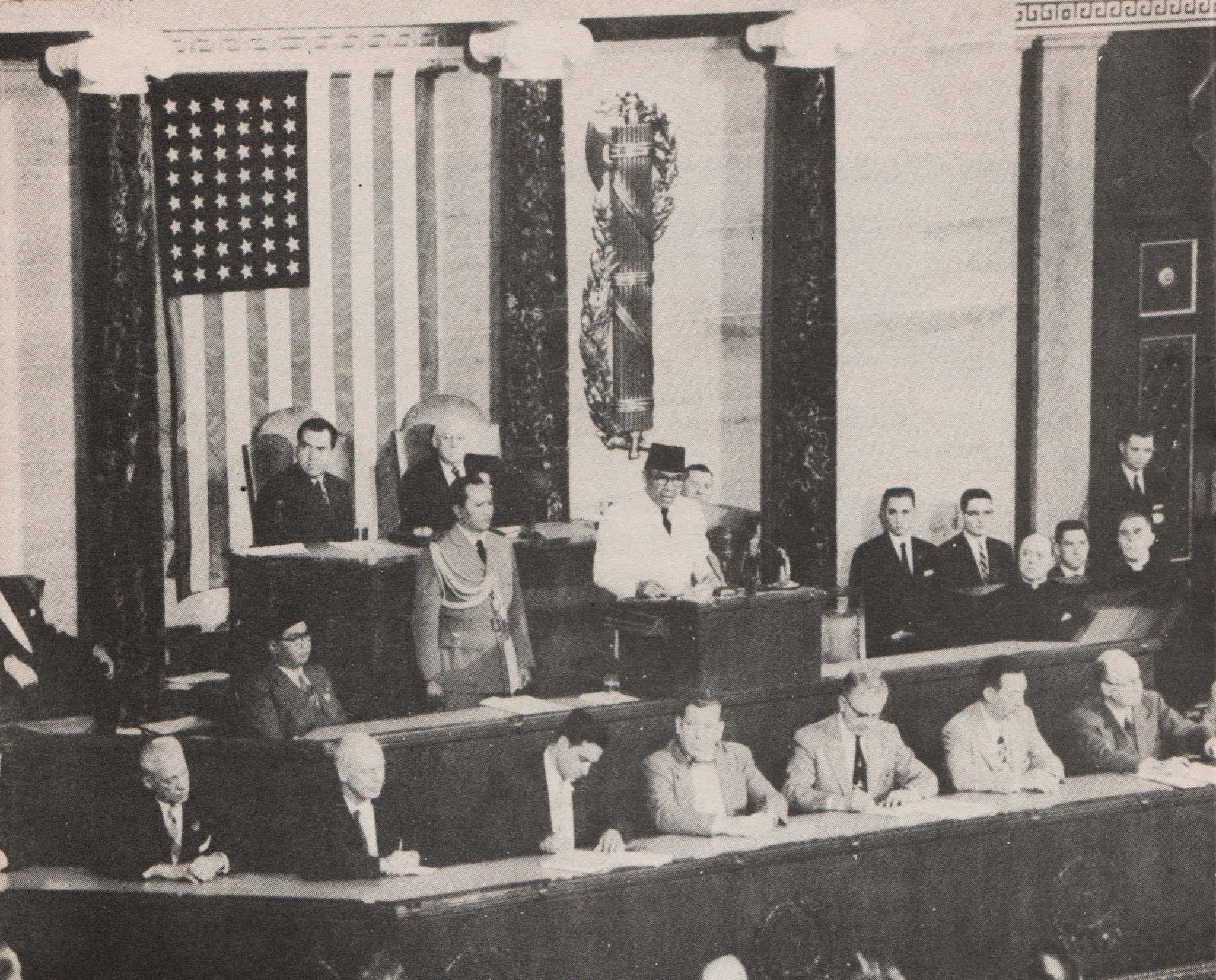
Indonesian president Sukarno addresses Congress in 1956. Sitting behind him Vice President Nixon and Speaker Rayburn. He is the only Indonesian president to address a joint session of Congress.

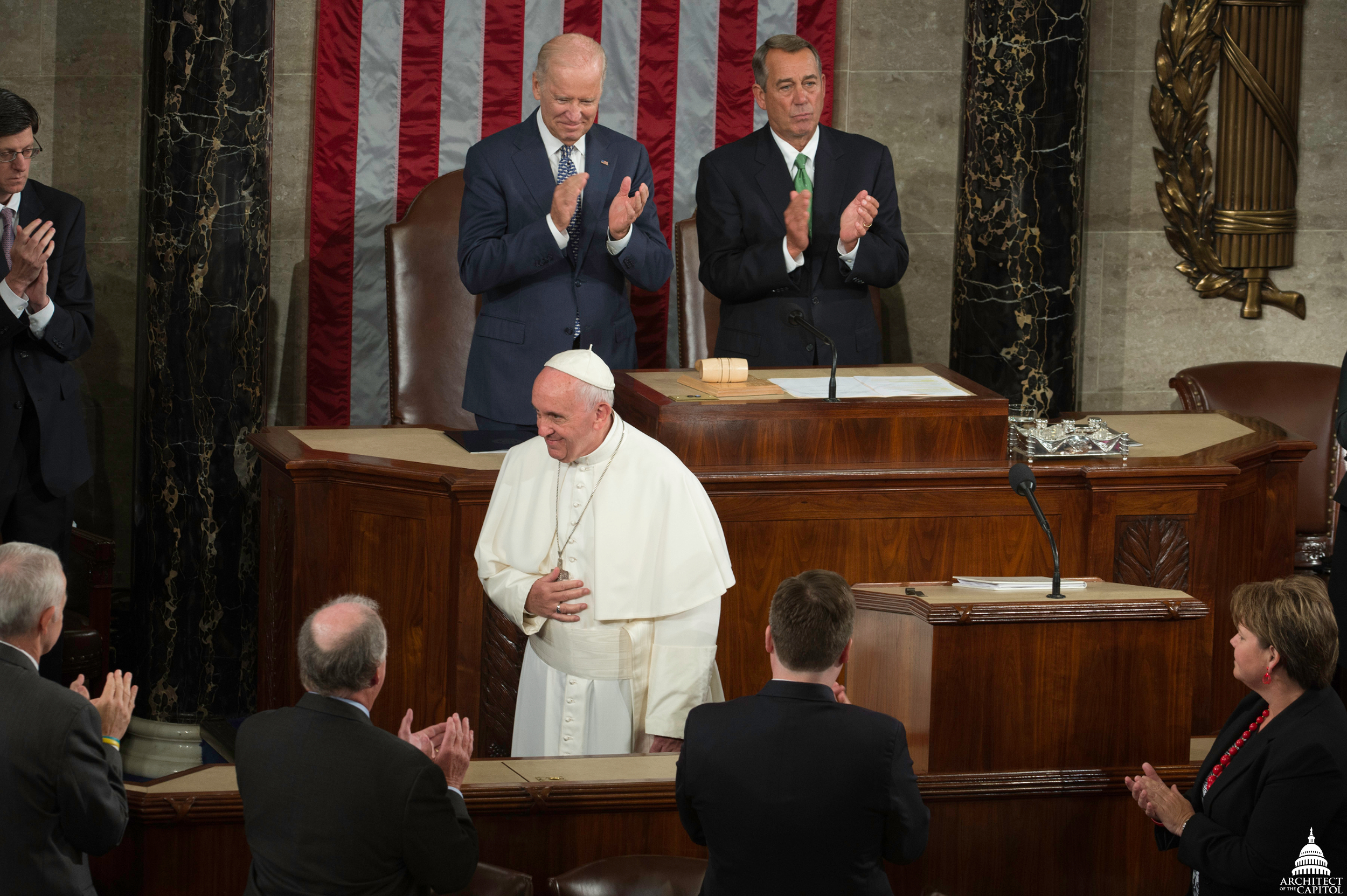
Pope Francis addresses Congress in 2015. Behind him are Vice President Biden and Speaker Boehner.

Joint meetings have been held more than a hundred times to enable foreign heads of state or heads of government to address Congress. Leaders of 48 countries have addressed Congress at a joint meeting: Israel leads the list with ten joint meetings addresses by heads of state or dignitaries. Other leading countries are: France (9), United Kingdom (9), Mexico (7), South Korea (7), India (6), Italy (6), Ireland (6), Germany, including West Germany and unified Germany (5), Australia (4), Canada (3), Argentina (3), Philippines (3), Japan (3), Spain (2), Ukraine (2).

Israeli prime minister Benjamin Netanyahu has made an unprecedented four joint addresses to Congress, more than any other foreign dignitary, surpassing the previous record of three held by Winston Churchill. These four addresses were in 1996, 2011, 2015, 2024 respectively. British prime minister Winston Churchill addressed joint meetings of Congress on three occasions (1941, 1943, 1952). Prime Minister of India Narendra Modi and Prime Minister of Israel Yitzhak Rabin addressed joint meetings of Congress on two occasions (Modi: 2016, 2023; Rabin: 1976 and 1994) as did Nelson Mandela of South Africa (1990 and 1994).

The first foreign dignitary to address a joint meeting of Congress was David Kalakaua, King of the Hawaiian Islands, on December 18, 1874, followed by Ambassador André de La Boulaye of France who addressed a joint session on May 20, 1934, to memorialize the centennial anniversary of the death of Marquis de Lafayette. The first non-dignitary to address a joint meeting of Congress was Polish Solidarity leader Lech Wałęsa in 1989. Nelson Mandela, then deputy president of the African National Congress addressed a joint meeting in 1990.

Twice have joint meetings been attended by dignitaries from two countries: On September 18, 1978, when Congress was addressed by Egyptian President Anwar Sadat and Israeli Prime Minister Menachem Begin, and on July 26, 1994, when Congress was addressed by King Hussein of Jordan and Israeli Prime Minister Yitzhak Rabin.

John Howard, Prime Minister of Australia, had originally been scheduled to address Congress on September 12, 2001, but his address was postponed due to the September 11 terrorist attacks the previous day. Howard's address was rescheduled for June 12, 2002, where he spoke about the attacks he had witnessed 9 months earlier. Howard was acknowledged with a standing ovation and describes the occasion as a "moving moment."

The most recent addresses by foreign dignitaries were given by King of the United Kingdom Charles III, on April 28, 2026, Prime Minister of Israel Benjamin Netanyahu, on July 24, 2024, Japanese Prime Minister Fumio Kishida, on April 11, 2024.

All foreign heads of state and heads of government are presented officially to Congress in the same manner as the president during the State of the Union Address and are introduced by the speaker by their diplomatic style of address, followed by their name and respective office.

=== Military leaders ===
The closing words of MacArthur's final address to a joint meeting of Congress

Joint meetings are sometimes called to hear addresses by generals, admirals, or other military leaders. Perhaps the most notable example is Douglas MacArthur's 1951 farewell address to Congress. In concluding the speech he recalled an old army song which contained the line "old soldiers never die; they just fade away". He then said, "And like the old soldier of that ballad, I now close my military career and just fade away, an old soldier who tried to do his duty as God gave him the light to see that duty. Good-bye".

=== Astronauts ===
Six times in the first years of the Space Age, Congress jointly met to be addressed by astronauts after their trips in space.

=== Memorials ===
Nine times, Congress has jointly met to hold a memorial service for a deceased president or former president. Congress has also met to memorialize Vice President James Sherman and the Marquis de Lafayette, and twice outside of Washington, once in Independence Hall in Philadelphia on July 16, 1987, the bicentennial of the Connecticut Compromise during the Constitutional Convention that determined the structure of Congress, and once in Federal Hall in New York City on September 6, 2002 to memorialize the victims of the September 11 attacks in advance of their first anniversary.

== Historic joint sessions and joint meetings ==
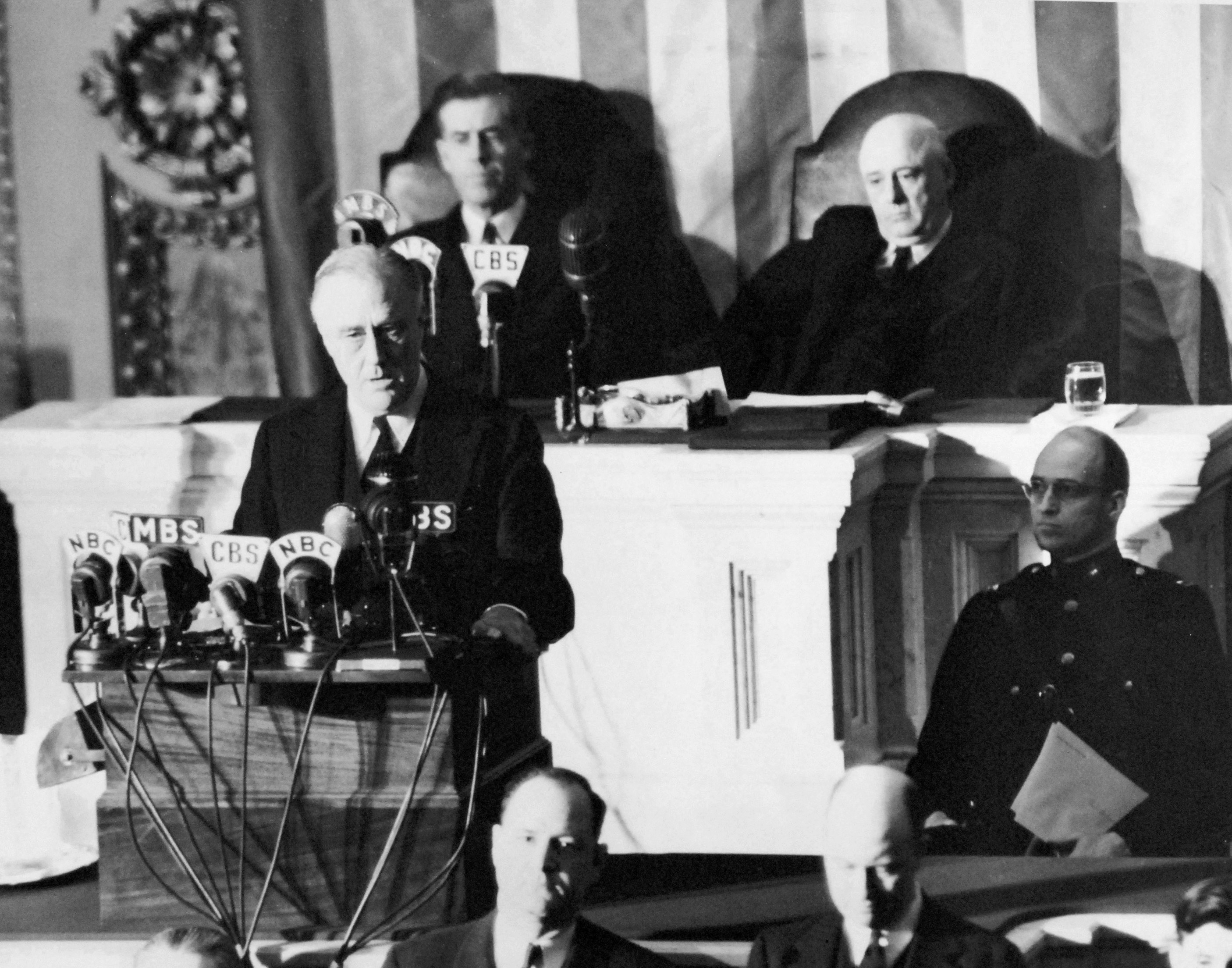

President Franklin D. Roosevelt's Day of Infamy Speech. Behind him are Vice President Wallace and Speaker Rayburn (audio only)

- The first occurrence of a joint session was on April 6, 1789, at Federal Hall in New York City during the 1st Congress, for the counting of electoral votes.
- On December 8, 1941, the day after the attack on Pearl Harbor, President Franklin D. Roosevelt delivered the "Day of Infamy speech" to a joint session of Congress. Less than an hour later, Congress issued a formal declaration of war against Japan and officially brought the U.S. into World War II. This address is regarded as one of the most famous American political speeches of the 20th century.
- On March 15, 1965, President Lyndon B. Johnson, after witnessing marchers beaten during the "Bloody Sunday" incident during the first Selma to Montgomery march, called on Congress to write and pass a Voting Rights Act. During this speech Johnson used the words "We Shall Overcome".
- On September 20, 2001, President George W. Bush gave a speech before a joint session of Congress in response to the September 11 attacks. Vice President Dick Cheney was the designated survivor which led to Senate president pro tempore Robert Byrd presiding alongside House Speaker Dennis Hastert.
- On January 6, 2021, during the joint session of Congress convened to count the electoral votes for the 2020 presidential election victory of Joe Biden, a mob of rioters supporting outgoing President Donald Trump stormed and vandalized the Capitol building. Four rioters died, one of whom was shot by Capitol Police. The joint session resumed later that evening, going into the following day.
- On April 28, 2021, two women presided over an address to Congress for the first time ever, with Vice President Kamala Harris and House Speaker Nancy Pelosi seated on the rostrum behind President Joe Biden.

=== Joint meetings ===
On December 18, 1874, Kalākaua was the first person in history received by the United States Congress in a joint meeting. This differs from a joint session of Congress, which requires the adoption of a concurrent resolution. Joint meetings of Congress are rare, and another one was not called until the 1900 Centennial of the Capital City.

== See also ==
- List of joint sessions of the United States Congress
- List of people who have addressed both Houses of the United Kingdom Parliament
- Joint address (Canada)—similar event held in the Parliament of Canada
- Joint session
- United States Congress
