= Deskin =

Deskin is a name. It can be both a given name and a surname. Notable people with this name include:

- Deskin Green (1847–1918), American state politician from Virginia
- Versil Deskin (1913–1992), American football player

== See also ==
- Deskins, a similarly-spelled surname
