= Ted Edmonds =

American politician

Member of the Kentucky House of Representatives from the 91st district
- In office January 1, 2003 – January 1, 2013
- Preceded by: Howard Cornett (redistricting)
- Succeeded by: Toby Herald

Personal details
- Party: Democratic

Ted Edmonds (born 1943) is an American politician from Kentucky who was a member of the Kentucky House of Representatives from 2003 to 2013. Edmonds was first elected in 2002 after incumbent representative Howard Cornett was redistricted to the 94th district. He was defeated for reelection in 2012 by Republican Toby Herald.
