= Winston Churchill's address to the United States Congress (1941) =

WWII-era speech in Washington, D.C.

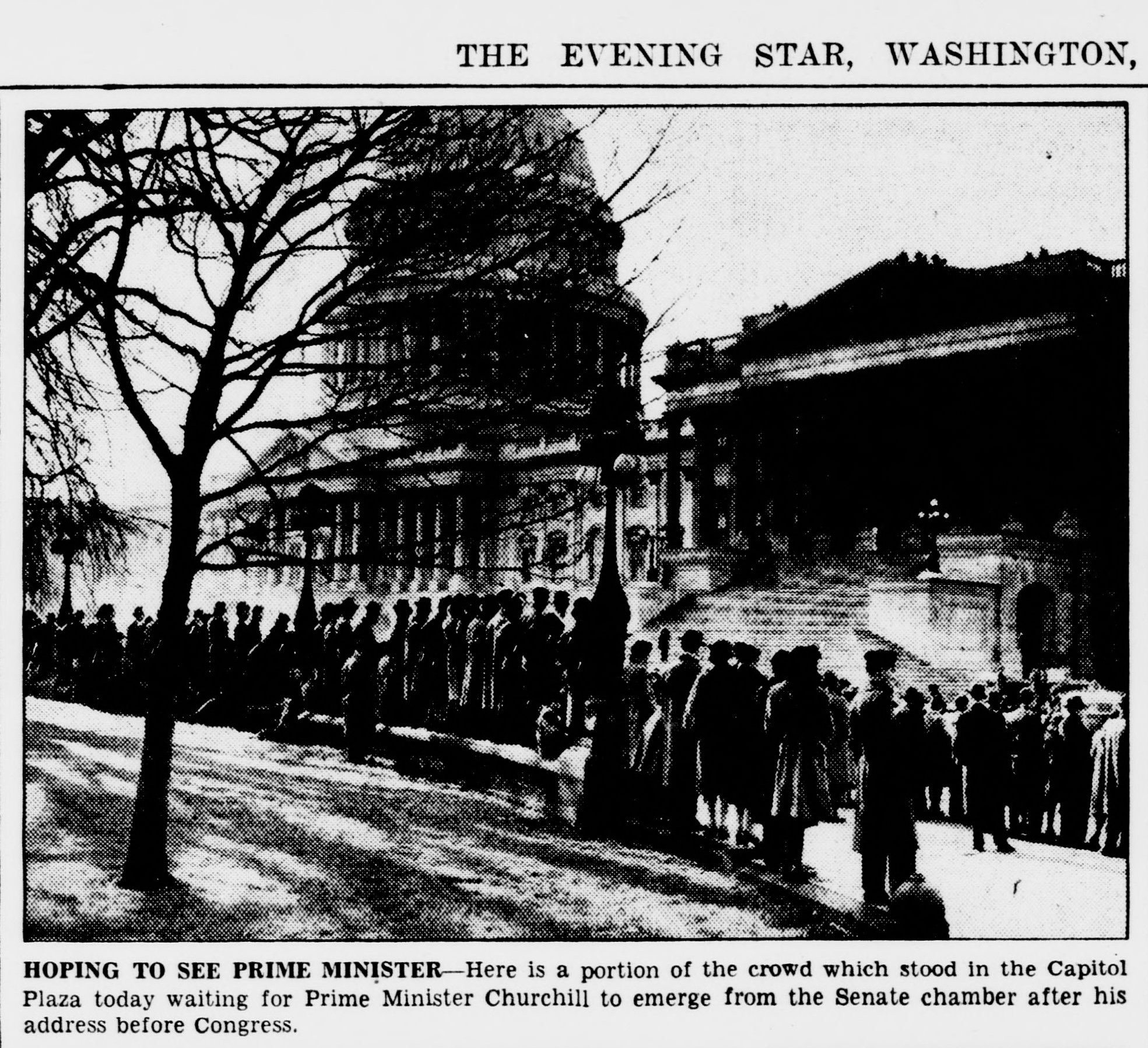
Crowds wait for Churchill outside the U.S. Capitol (Washington Star)

Winston Churchill's first address to the 77th United States Congress was a 30-minute World War II-era radio-broadcast speech made in the chamber of the United States Senate on December 26, 1941. The prime minister of the United Kingdom addressed a joint meeting of the bicameral legislature of the United States about the state of the UK–U.S. alliance and their prospects for defeating the Axis powers.

Churchill's speech to Congress was a public event of the larger Arcadia Conference in Washington, D.C., between the Anglo-American diplomatic and military corps to coordinate Allied plans for World War II following the U.S. declarations of war on Japan and Germany on December 8 and 11, respectively. Churchill had finished writing the text of the speech on Christmas Day in his rooms at the White House, after having attended church with President and Mrs. Roosevelt.

Churchill opened the address with a reference to his Brooklyn-born mother, quipping, "I cannot help reflecting that if my father had been American and my mother British, instead of the other way round, I might have got here on my own. In that case, this would not have been the first time you would have heard my voice." The bulk of the speech was devoted to a promise of eventual victory—but not without a long grim journey between here and there.

...both of us have much to learn in the cruel art of war. We have therefore without doubt a time of tribulation before us. In this same time, some ground will be lost which it will be hard and costly to regain. Many disappointments and unpleasant surprises await us. Many of them will afflict us before the full marshalling of our latent and total power can be accomplished [...] What kind of a people do they think we are? Is it possible that they do not realize that we shall never cease to persevere against them until they have been taught a lesson which they and the world will never forget?

— Churchill, speaking in the U.S. Senate chamber, 1941

Churchill ended the speech by stating, "It is not given to us to peer into the mysteries of the future. Still, I avow my hope and faith, sure and inviolate, that in the days to come the British and American peoples will, for their own safety and for the good of all, walk together in majesty, in justice and in peace." To which Chief Justice Harlan Stone replied from the front row with a V for victory hand sign; Churchill replied in kind and the chamber erupted with cheers and thunderous applause. On the whole, the speech was extremely well-received by members of Congress and the American press.

Churchill followed up his address with an evening screening of The Maltese Falcon, in the company of President Roosevelt and Mackenzie King, the Prime Minister of Canada. Churchill would address the Parliament of Canada four days later in his "Some chicken! Some neck!" speech.

Churchill was the second non-American head of government to address Congress; the first was Kalakaua, King of Hawaii, in 1874. In addition to the 1941 appearance, Churchill returned to Capitol Hill to address Congress again in 1943 and in 1952. He held the record for most Congressional addresses by a non-American which was matched in 2015 and then broken in 2024 by Benjamin Netanyahu of Israel.

Wikisource has the complete text of Churchill's address to Congress.

== See also ==
- List of joint sessions of the United States Congress § 1940s
- Winston Churchill in the Second World War
- Winston Churchill's address to Congress (1943)
- Winston Churchill's address to Congress (1952)
- Joint address (Canada)
