= Winston Churchill's address to the United States Congress (1952) =

Cold War–era speech in Washington, D.C.

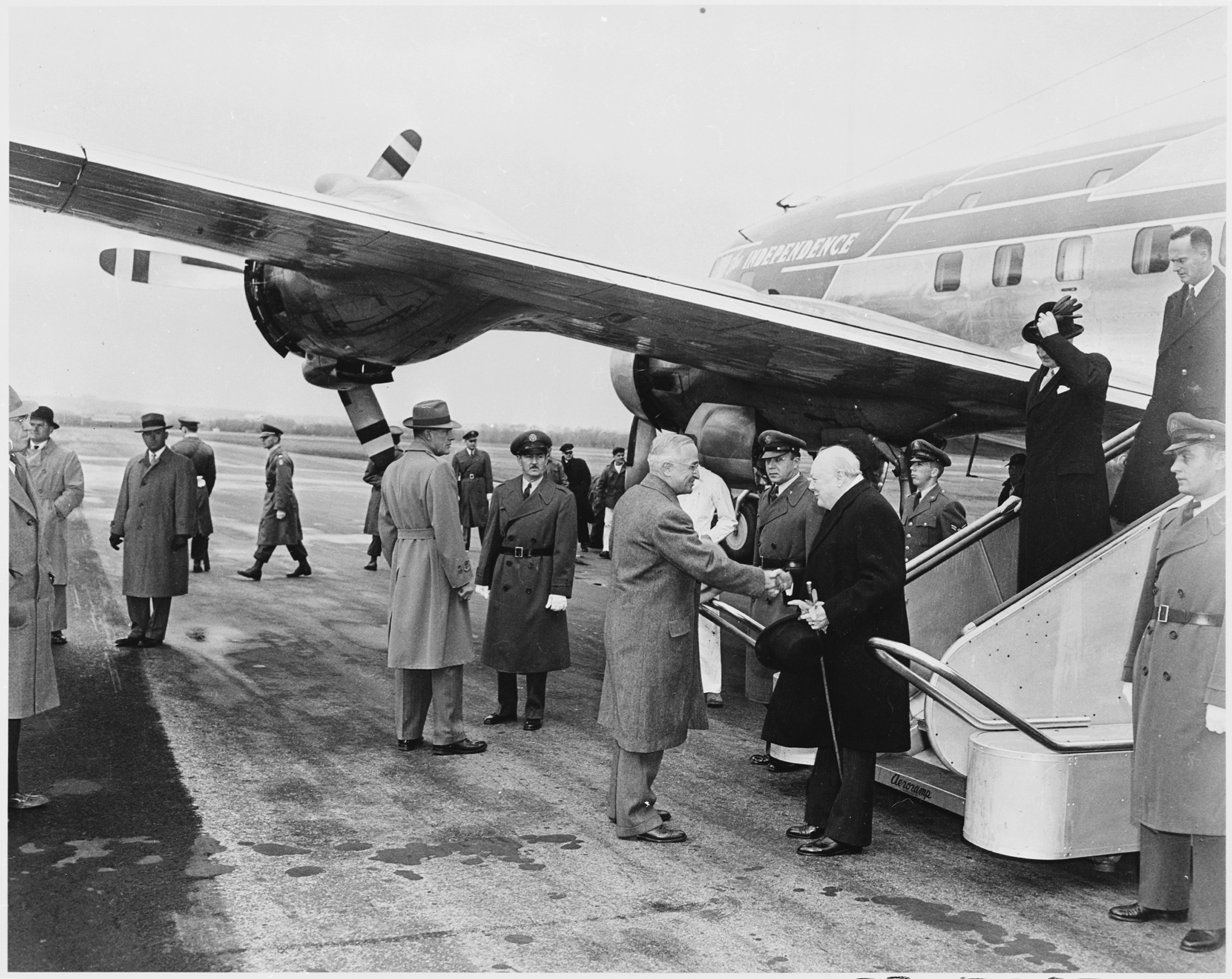
U.S. President Harry S. Truman greeting British Prime Minister Winston Churchill upon his arrival at Washington, D.C. (1952)

Winston Churchill's address to Congress of January 17, 1952 was the British Prime Minister's third and last address to a joint session of the U.S. Congress, following his World War II-era speeches in 1941 and in 1943. Winston Churchill's three speeches to Congress was the record for most speeches by a foreign leader until Benyamin Netanyahu made his fourth address to the U.S. national legislature in 2024.

As was the case with the first two speeches, this address was set against the background of complex foreign-policy negotiations, in this case particularly about how to manage the burgeoning Cold War, and the distinct orientations of the Americans and the British in regard to the Middle East and Far East. According to historian John W. Young, the 1952 speech was "all-in-all...not one of his best," but it was deemed at least adequate for communicating Churchill's foreign policy goals and renewing some (although by no means all) of the close cooperation of war years.

== Context and content ==
The speech came shortly after Churchill's October 1951 reelection to the position of Prime Minister of the United Kingdom, after a six-year interregnum following World War II where the office was held by Clement Attlee. Making the speech was one of Churchill's goals for the wintertime trip to the U.S., along with building a personal relationship with Harry Truman. Churchill had been reluctant to pre-plan the conference agenda and could not be persuaded to read policy papers on the transatlantic voyage to the United States, focusing instead on drafting his speech to the American legislature. Churchill's focus on the speech also somewhat complicated the already ad-hoc summit, as "In his haste to visit Washington as soon as possible, the Prime Minister had agreed to see Truman in early January; but Churchill also wished to address Congress which did not meet until a fortnight later." Churchill filled in the gap by visiting with his friend Bernard Baruch and touring Canada.

The speech came at a challenging time in the history of UK–US bilateral relations, as the comity, but also the formal structure, of the wartime alliance had given way to struggles over economic policy, Soviet-containment issues, and the structure of NATO. One of Churchill's arguments before Congress was that at least the Cold War had the advantage of encouraging and likely accelerating the continued alliance of Western European countries, whereas otherwise they might have resorted to historic squabbles.

Historians argue that Churchill deftly used the moment to clarify the British position (he wasn't there to ask for money, he said, even though the British economy was struggling) and he communicated that the Special Relationship ought to be valuable to, and valued by, both parties. Still, Churchill advised Congress that if they wanted a fully armed United Kingdom, they needed help—in his phrasing, the country wanted "steel not gold". The one major gaffe was inviting the Americans to join the British in the Suez Canal area, which historian Young deems "a preposterous idea [that] showed little understanding of US attitudes toward British colonialism". The speech was ultimately somewhat counterproductive in that "wide-ranging Anglo-American differences were drawn into the public gaze by Churchill's push for an American military presence in the Suez Canal Zone, as well as his promise of 'prompt, resolute and effective' action in the event that a truce in Korea were later broken."

The foreign policy issues addressed by this speech included the Korean War and nuclear armaments. In both cases, Churchill drew applause and approval from the audience, as he promised to support the American action in Korea and also urged the United States to continue developing atomic weapons in the face of Stalinism and Soviet expansionism, etc.

As he had done during his first speech at the United States Capitol in 1941, he referred to his mother's American ancestry, in this case stating, "I was on both sides in the war between us and we." When exiting the United States through New York, he quipped "I don't feel on uneven terms with your might and my prestige" in response to pointed questions about the balance of power between the two countries. Per Young, the "courteous treatment which Churchill received in Washington was thanks to his wartime reputation, and the fear of his trouble-making capacity"—the visit had served Churchill's personal needs but had only minimally resolved foreign policy disputes between the two countries.

== Setting and reception ==
Bess Truman attended the speech in person, Harry Truman watched on television from the Oval Office. The speech was viewed as being keyed very much to politicians and legislators rather than to the general public. U.S. Senator Robert A. Taft commended Churchill's "forceful and humorous use of the English language".

== See also ==
- Second premiership of Winston Churchill
- Presidency of Harry S. Truman
- List of joint sessions of the United States Congress § 1950s
