= Winston Churchill in the Second World War =

Life of Winston Churchil in the second world war

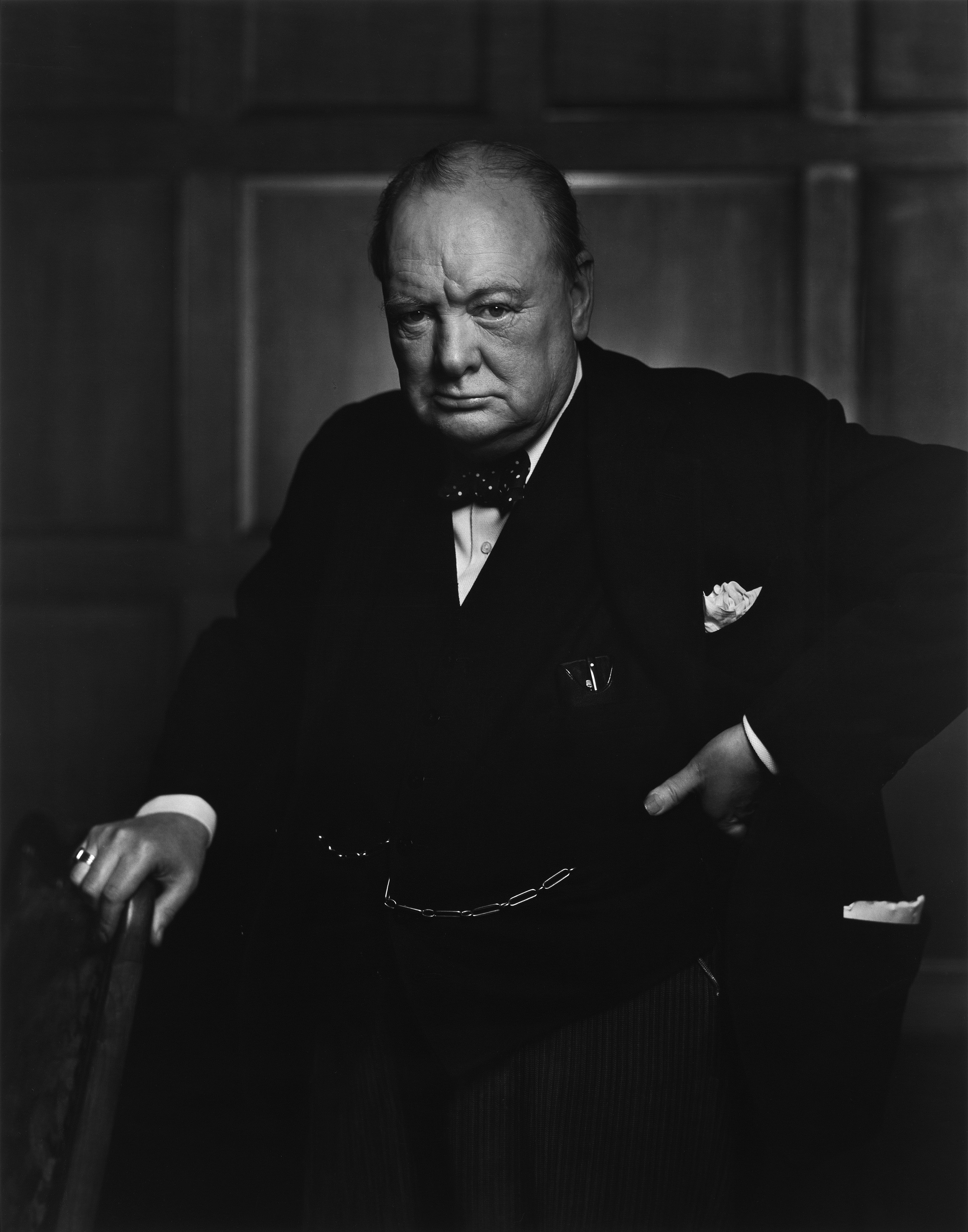
The Roaring Lion, a portrait by Yousuf Karsh at the Canadian Parliament, 30 December 1941.

Winston Churchill was appointed First Lord of the Admiralty on 3 September 1939, the day that the United Kingdom declared war on Nazi Germany. He succeeded Neville Chamberlain as prime minister on 10 May 1940 and held the post until 26 July 1945. Out of office during the 1930s, Churchill had taken the lead in calling for British re-armament to counter the growing threat of militarism in Nazi Germany.

As prime minister, he oversaw British involvement in the Allied war effort against the Axis powers. Regarded as the most important of the Allied leaders during the first half of the Second World War, Historians have long held Churchill in high regard as a wartime leader who played an important role in defending Europe's liberal democracy against the spread of fascism. For his wartime leadership and for his contributions in overseeing the war effort, he has been consistently ranked both by scholars and the public as one of the top three greatest British prime ministers, often seen as the greatest prime minister in British history.

== First Lord of the Admiralty: September 1939 to May 1940 ==
=== The Phoney War and the Norwegian Campaign ===
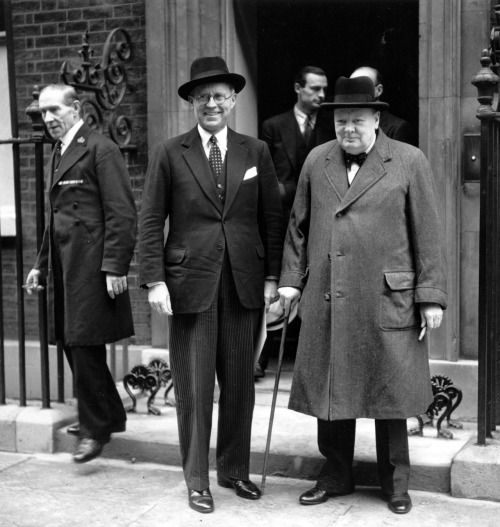
Churchill with US ambassador Joseph P. Kennedy Sr. in 1939.

On 3 September 1939, the day Britain declared war on Germany following the outbreak of the Second World War, Chamberlain appointed Churchill as First Lord of the Admiralty, the same position he had held at the beginning of the First World War. As such he was a member of Chamberlain's war cabinet. Churchill later claimed that, on learning of his appointment, the Board of Admiralty sent a signal to the Fleet: "Winston is back". Although this story was repeated by Lord Mountbatten in a speech at Edmonton in 1966, Richard M. Langworth notes that neither he nor Churchill's official biographer Martin Gilbert have found contemporary evidence to confirm it, suggesting that it may well be a later invention.

As First Lord, Churchill proved to be one of the highest-profile ministers during the so-called "Phoney War", when the only significant action by British forces was at sea. Churchill was ebullient after the Battle of the River Plate on 13 December 1939 and afterwards welcomed home the crews, congratulating them on "a brilliant sea fight" and saying that their actions in a cold, dark winter had "warmed the cockles of the British heart". On 16 February 1940, Churchill personally ordered Captain Philip Vian of the destroyer HMS Cossack to board the German supply ship Altmark in Norwegian waters and liberate some 300 British prisoners who had been captured by the Admiral Graf Spee. These actions, supplemented by his speeches, considerably enhanced Churchill's reputation.

He was concerned about German naval activity in the Baltic Sea and initially wanted to send a naval force there but this was soon changed to a plan, codenamed Operation Wilfred, to mine Norwegian waters and stop iron ore shipments from Narvik to Germany. There were disagreements about mining, both in the war cabinet and with the French government. As a result, Wilfred was delayed until 8 April 1940, the day before the German invasion of Norway was launched.

=== The Norway Debate and Chamberlain's resignation ===
After the Allies failed to prevent the German occupation of Norway, the Commons held an open debate from 7 to 9 May on the government's conduct of the war. This has come to be known as the Norway Debate and is renowned as one of the most significant events in parliamentary history. On the second day (Wednesday, 8 May), the Labour opposition called for a division which was in effect a vote of no confidence in Chamberlain's government. There was considerable support for Churchill on both sides of the House but, as a member of the government, he was obliged to speak on its behalf. He was called upon to wind up the debate, which placed him in the difficult position of having to defend the government without damaging his own prestige. Although the government won the vote, its majority was drastically reduced amid calls for a national government to be formed.

In the early hours of 10 May, German forces invaded Belgium, Luxembourg and the Netherlands as a prelude to their assault on France. Since the division vote, Chamberlain had been trying to form a coalition but Labour declared on the Friday afternoon that they would not serve under his leadership, although they would accept another Conservative. The only two candidates were Churchill and Lord Halifax, the Foreign Secretary. The matter had already been discussed at a meeting on the 9th between Chamberlain, Halifax, Churchill, and David Margesson, the government Chief Whip. Halifax admitted that he could not govern effectively as a member of the House of Lords and so Chamberlain advised the King to send for Churchill, who became prime minister. His first act was to write to Chamberlain and thank him for his support.

Churchill later wrote of feeling a profound sense of relief in that he now had authority over the whole scene. He believed himself to be walking with destiny and that his life so far had been "a preparation for this hour and for this trial".

== Prime Minister: 1940–1945 ==
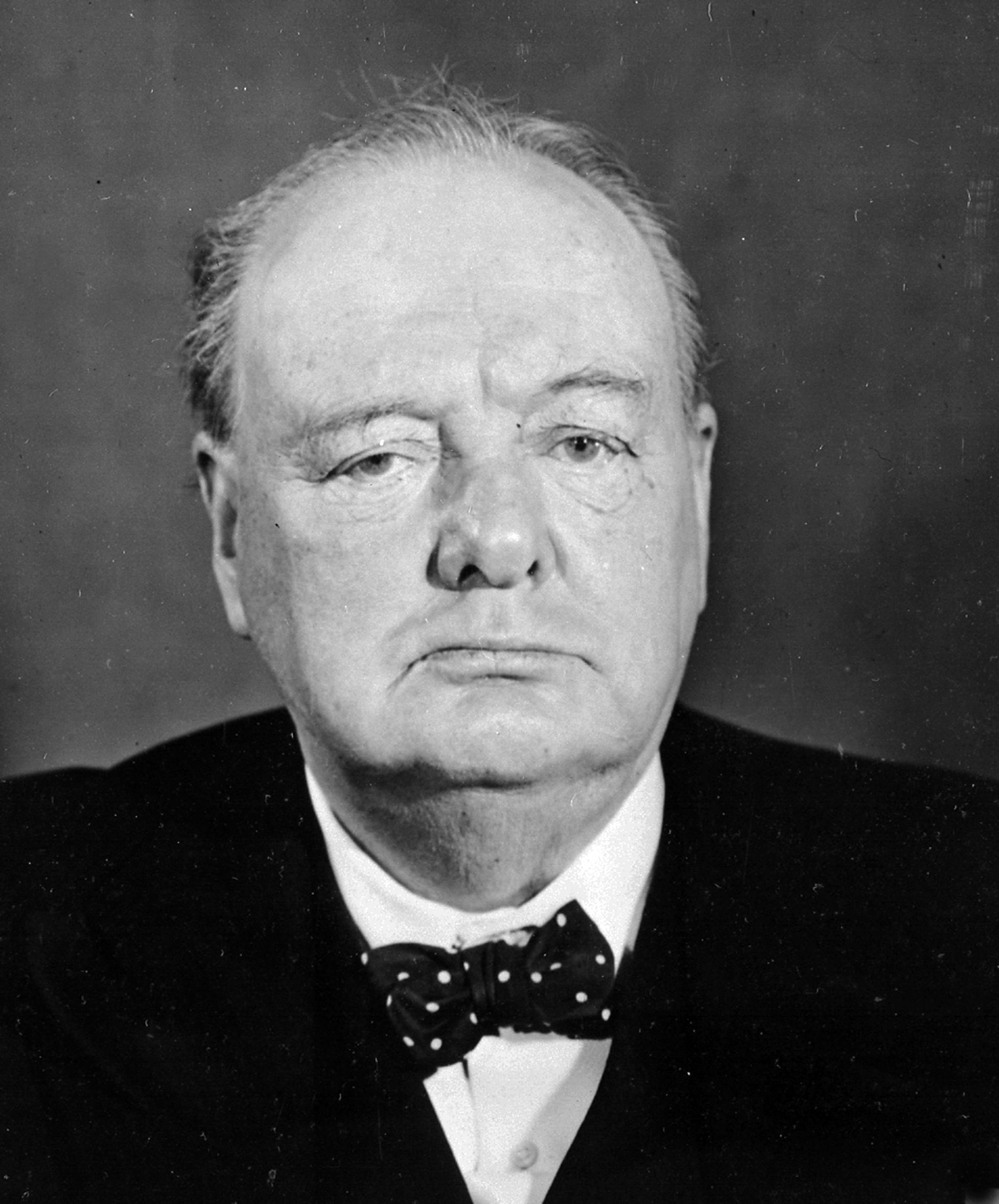
- Official portrait, 1945
- First premiership of Winston Churchill; 10 May 1940 – 26 July 1945
- Monarch: George VI
- Cabinet: Churchill war ministry; Churchill caretaker ministry
- Party: Conservative
- Seat: 10 Downing Street
- Coat of Arms of HM Government

=== Dunkirk to Pearl Harbor: May 1940 to December 1941 ===
==== Initial reaction to Churchill as Premier ====
In May, Churchill was still unpopular with many Conservatives, with probably the majority of the Labour Party, and with the so-called Establishment – Jenkins says his accession to the premiership was "at best the equivalent of an abrupt wartime marriage". He probably could not have won a majority in any of the political parties in the House of Commons, and the House of Lords was completely silent when it learned of his appointment. Chamberlain remained Conservative Party leader until October when ill health forced his resignation – he died of cancer in November. By that time, Churchill had won the doubters over and his succession as party leader was a formality. Ralph Ingersoll reported in November: "Everywhere I went in London people admired [Churchill's] energy, his courage, his singleness of purpose. People said they didn't know what Britain would do without him. He was obviously respected. But no one felt he would be prime minister after the war. He was simply the right man in the right job at the right time. The time being the time of a desperate war with Britain's enemies".

==== War ministry created ====
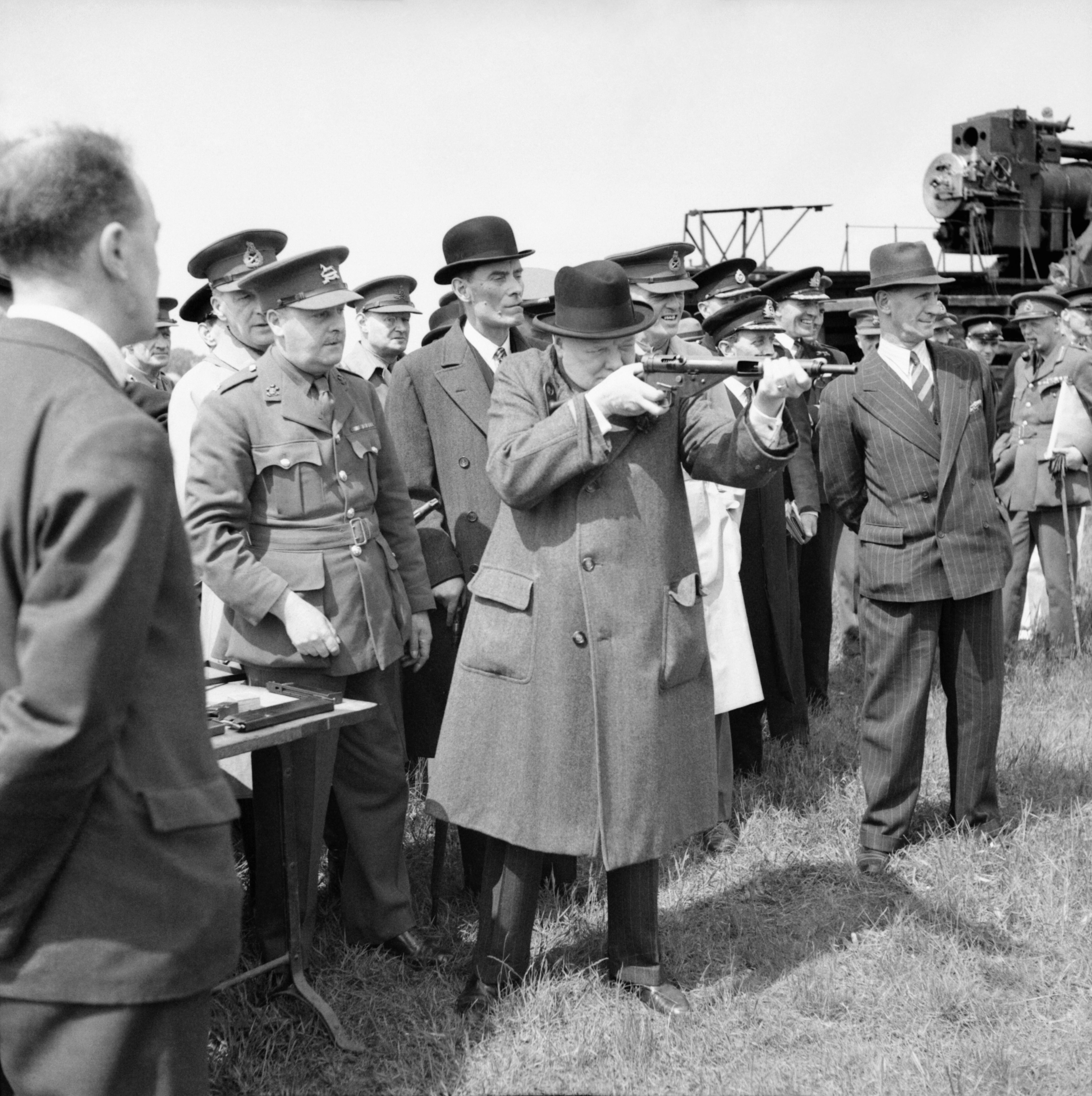
Churchill takes aim with a Sten sub-machine gun in June 1941. The man in the pin-striped suit and fedora to the right is his bodyguard, Walter H. Thompson.

The war energised Churchill, who was 65 years old when he became prime minister. Stating that he was the only top leader from World War I who still had an important political job, John Gunther wrote in 1940 that Churchill "looks ten years younger than he is". Hubert Renfro Knickerbocker wrote in 1941 that "The responsibilities which are his now must be greater than those carried by any other human being on earth. One would think such a weight would have a crushing effect upon him. Not at all. The last time I saw him, while the Battle of Britain was still raging, he looked twenty years younger than before the war began ... His uplifted spirit is transmitted to the people".

Churchill began his premiership by forming a five-man war cabinet which included Chamberlain as Lord President of the Council, Labour leader Clement Attlee as Lord Privy Seal (later as deputy prime minister), Halifax as Foreign Secretary and Labour's Arthur Greenwood as a minister without portfolio. In practice, these five were augmented by the service chiefs and ministers who attended the majority of meetings. The cabinet changed in size and membership as the war progressed. By the end of 1940, it had increased to eight after Churchill, Attlee and Greenwood were joined by Ernest Bevin as Minister of Labour and National Service; Anthony Eden as Foreign Secretary – replacing Halifax, who was sent to Washington, D.C. as ambassador to the United States; Lord Beaverbrook as Minister of Aircraft Production; Sir Kingsley Wood as Chancellor of the Exchequer; and Sir John Anderson as Lord President of the Council – replacing Chamberlain who died in November (Anderson later became Chancellor after Kingsley Wood's death in September 1943). Jenkins described this combination as a "war cabinet for winning", contrasting it with Chamberlain's "war cabinet for losing". In response to previous criticisms that there had been no clear single minister in charge of the prosecution of the war, Churchill created and took the additional position of Minister of Defence, making him the most powerful wartime prime minister in British history.

Churchill wanted people he knew and trusted to take part in government. Among these were personal friends like Beaverbrook and Frederick Lindemann, who became the government's scientific advisor. Lindemann was one of several outside exports drafted in and these "technocrats" fulfilled vital functions, especially on the Home Front. Churchill would proudly proclaim that his government, in the interests of national unity, was the most broadly based in British political history as it spanned far right to far left by including such figures as Lord Lloyd on the right and Ellen Wilkinson on the left.

==== Resolve to fight on ====
At the end of May, with the British Expeditionary Force in retreat to Dunkirk and the Fall of France seemingly imminent, Halifax proposed that the government should explore the possibility of a negotiated peace settlement using Mussolini as an intermediary given that Italy was still neutral. There were several high-level meetings from 26 to 28 May, including two with the French premier Paul Reynaud. Churchill's resolve was to fight on, even if France capitulated, but his position remained precarious until Chamberlain resolved to support him. Churchill had the full support of the two Labour members but knew he could not survive as prime minister if both Chamberlain and Halifax were against him. In the end, by gaining the support of his outer cabinet, Churchill outmanoeuvred Halifax and won Chamberlain over. The essence of Churchill's argument was that, as he said, "it was idle to think that, if we tried to make peace now, we should get better terms than if we fought it out". He therefore concluded that the only option was to fight on though, at times, he personally was pessimistic about the chances of a British victory, as on 12 June 1940 when he told General Hastings Ismay that "[y]ou and I will be dead in three months' time". Nonetheless, his use of rhetoric hardened public opinion against a peaceful resolution and prepared the British people for a long war – Jenkins says Churchill's speeches were "an inspiration for the nation, and a catharsis for Churchill himself".

==== Importance of Churchill's wartime speeches ====
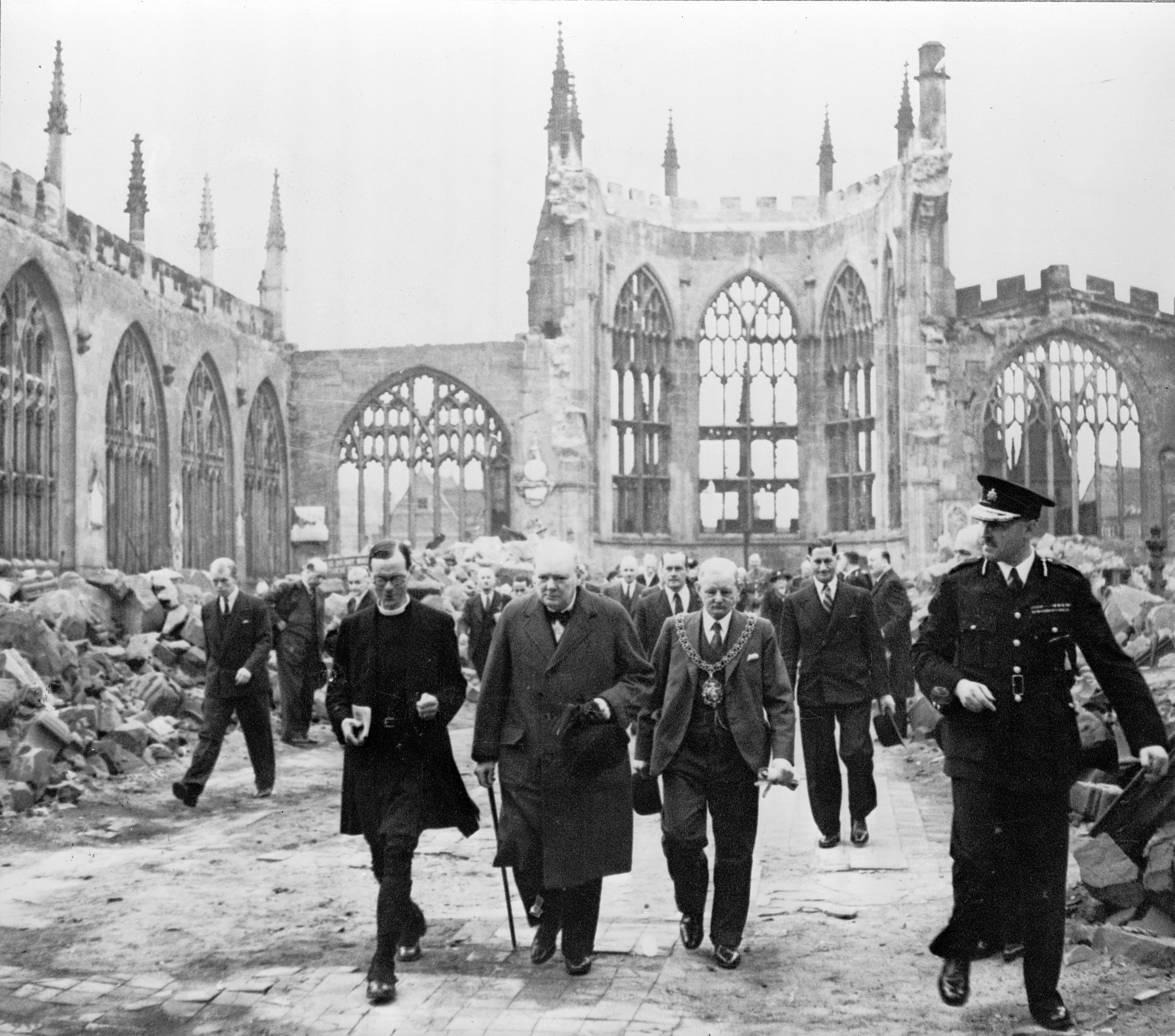
Churchill walks through the ruins of Coventry Cathedral with J A Moseley, M G Haigh, A R Grindlay and others, 1941.

Churchill's wartime speeches were a great inspiration to the embattled British, beginning with his first as prime minister, which he had delivered to the Commons on 13 May: the "blood, toil, tears and sweat" speech. It was not well-received at the time, mainly because the majority of Conservative MPs held doubts about Churchill's suitability to be premier. It was in fact little more than a short statement but, Jenkins says, "it included phrases which have reverberated down the decades". Churchill made it plain to the nation that a long, hard road lay ahead and that victory was the final goal:

I would say to the House, as I said to those who have joined this government, that I have nothing to offer but blood, toil, tears and sweat. We have before us an ordeal of the most grievous kind. We have before us many, many long months of struggle and of suffering. You ask, what is our policy? I will say: it is to wage war, by sea, land and air, with all our might and with all the strength that God can give us; to wage war against a monstrous tyranny, never surpassed in the dark, lamentable catalogue of human crime. That is our policy. You ask, what is our aim? I can answer in one word: it is victory, victory at all costs, victory in spite of all terror, victory, however long and hard the road may be; for without victory, there is no survival. Let that be realised; no survival for the British Empire, no survival for all that the British Empire has stood for, no survival for the urge and impulse of the ages, that mankind will move forward towards its goal. But I take up my task with buoyancy and hope. I feel sure that our cause will not be suffered to fail among men. At this time I feel entitled to claim the aid of all, and I say: Come then, let us go forward together with our united strength.

==== Dunkirk evacuation and the Battle of France ====
Operation Dynamo, the evacuation of 338,226 Allied servicemen from Dunkirk, ended on Tuesday, 4 June when the French rearguard surrendered. The total was far in excess of expectations and it gave rise to a popular view that Dunkirk had been a miracle, and even a victory. Churchill himself referred to "a miracle of deliverance" in his "we shall fight on the beaches" speech to the Commons that afternoon, though he shortly reminded everyone that: "We must be very careful not to assign to this deliverance the attributes of a victory. Wars are not won by evacuations". The speech ended on a note of defiance coupled with a clear appeal to the United States:

We shall go on to the end. We shall fight in France, we shall fight on the seas and oceans, we shall fight with growing confidence and growing strength in the air. We shall defend our Island, whatever the cost may be. We shall fight on the beaches, we shall fight on the landing grounds, we shall fight in the fields and in the streets, we shall fight in the hills. We shall never surrender, and even if, which I do not for a moment believe, this Island or a large part of it were subjugated and starving, then our Empire beyond the seas, armed and guarded by the British Fleet, would carry on the struggle, until, in God's good time, the New World, with all its power and might, steps forth to the rescue and the liberation of the old.

Germany initiated Fall Rot the following day and Italy entered the war on the 10th. The Wehrmacht occupied Paris on the 14th and completed their conquest of France on 25 June. It was now inevitable that Hitler would attack and probably try to invade Great Britain. Faced with this, Churchill addressed the Commons on 18 June and delivered one of his most famous speeches, ending with this peroration:

What General Weygand called the "Battle of France" is over. I expect that the Battle of Britain is about to begin. Upon this battle depends the survival of Christian civilisation. Upon it depends our own British life and the long continuity of our institutions and our Empire. The whole fury and might of the enemy must very soon be turned on us. Hitler knows that he will have to break us in this island or lose the war. If we can stand up to him all Europe may be free, and the life of the world may move forward into broad, sunlit uplands; but if we fail then the whole world, including the United States, and all that we have known and cared for, will sink into the abyss of a new dark age made more sinister, and perhaps more prolonged, by the lights of a perverted science. Let us therefore brace ourselves to our duty and so bear ourselves that if the British Commonwealth and Empire lasts for a thousand years, men will still say: "This was their finest hour".

Churchill was determined to fight back and ordered the commencement of the Western Desert campaign on 11 June, an immediate response to the Italian declaration of war. This went well at first while the Italian army was the sole opposition and Operation Compass was a noted success. In early 1941, however, Mussolini requested German support and Hitler sent the Afrika Korps to Tripoli under the command of Generalleutnant Erwin Rommel, who arrived not long after Churchill had halted Compass so that he could reassign forces to Greece where the Balkans campaign was entering a critical phase.

In other initiatives through June and July 1940, Churchill ordered the formation of both the Special Operations Executive (SOE) and the Commandos. The SOE was ordered to promote and execute subversive activity in Nazi-occupied Europe while the Commandos were charged with raids on specific military targets there. Hugh Dalton, the Minister of Economic Warfare, took political responsibility for the SOE and recorded in his diary that Churchill told him: "And now go and set Europe ablaze".

==== The Battle of Britain and the Blitz ====
On 20 August 1940, at the height of the Battle of Britain, Churchill addressed the Commons to outline the war situation. In the middle of this speech, he made a statement that created a famous nickname for the RAF fighter pilots involved in the battle:

The gratitude of every home in our Island, in our Empire, and indeed throughout the world, except in the abodes of the guilty, goes out to the British airmen who, undaunted by odds, unwearied in their constant challenge and mortal danger, are turning the tide of the World War by their prowess and by their devotion. Never in the field of human conflict was so much owed by so many to so few.

The Luftwaffe altered its strategy from 7 September 1940 and began to bomb London, at first in daylight raids and then, after their losses became unacceptably high, at night. The raids were soon extended to provincial cities such as the notorious attack on Coventry on 14 November. The Blitz was especially intensive through October and November. It can be said to have continued for eight months, by which time Hitler was ready to launch Operation Barbarossa, the invasion of the USSR. The Luftwaffe failed its objective of reducing British war production, which actually increased.

Churchill used to watch air raids from the Whitehall rooftops and was all for intensive anti-aircraft barrages, regardless of whether anything was being hit or not. He was totally opposed to proposals that the seat of government should be removed to Worcestershire and made extensive use of the Cabinet War Rooms below the Treasury building. His morale during the Blitz was generally high and he told his private secretary John Colville in November that he thought the threat of invasion was past. He was confident that Great Britain could hold its own, given the increase in output, but was realistic about its chances of actually winning the war without American intervention.

==== Lend-Lease ====
In September 1940, the British and American governments concluded the Destroyers for Bases Agreement, by which fifty American destroyers were transferred to the Royal Navy in exchange for free US base rights in Bermuda, the Caribbean and Newfoundland. An added advantage for Britain was that its military assets in those bases could be redeployed elsewhere.

Churchill's good relations with United States President Franklin D. Roosevelt helped secure vital food, oil and munitions via the North Atlantic shipping routes. Between 1939 and 1945 they exchanged an estimated 1700 letters and telegrams and met 11 times; Churchill estimated that they had 120 days of close personal contact. It was for this reason that Churchill was relieved when Roosevelt was re-elected in 1940. Upon re-election, Roosevelt set about implementing a new method of providing necessities to Great Britain without the need for monetary payment. He persuaded Congress that repayment for this immensely costly service would take the form of defending the US. The policy was known as Lend-Lease and it was formally enacted on 11 March 1941.

==== Operation Barbarossa ====
Hitler launched his invasion of the Soviet Union on Sunday, 22 June 1941. It was no surprise to Churchill who had known since early April, from Enigma decrypts at Bletchley Park, that the attack was imminent. He had tried to warn General Secretary Joseph Stalin via the British ambassador to Moscow, Stafford Cripps, but to no avail as Stalin did not trust Churchill. The night before the attack, already intending an address to the nation, Churchill alluded to his hitherto anti-communist views by saying to Colville: "If Hitler invaded Hell, I would at least make a favourable reference to the Devil".

==== Atlantic Charter ====
In August 1941, Churchill made his first transatlantic crossing of the war on board HMS Prince of Wales and met Roosevelt in Placentia Bay, Newfoundland. On 14 August, they issued the joint statement that has become known as the Atlantic Charter. This outlined the goals of both countries for the future of the world and it is seen as the inspiration for the 1942 Declaration by United Nations, itself the basis of the United Nations which was founded in June 1945.

=== Pearl Harbor to D-Day: December 1941 to June 1944 ===
==== Pearl Harbor and United States entry into the war ====
On 7–8 December 1941, the Japanese attack on Pearl Harbor was followed by their invasion of Malaya and, on the 8th, Churchill declared war on Japan. Three days later came the joint declaration of war by Germany and Italy against the United States. Churchill went to Washington later in the month to meet Roosevelt for the first Washington Conference (codename Arcadia). This was important for "Europe First", the decision to prioritise victory in Europe over victory in the Pacific, taken by Roosevelt while Churchill was still in mid-Atlantic. The Americans agreed with Churchill that Hitler was the main enemy and that the defeat of Germany was key to Allied success. It was also agreed that the first joint Anglo-American strike would be Operation Torch, the invasion of French North Africa (i.e., Algeria and Morocco). Originally planned for the spring of 1942, it was finally launched in November 1942 when the crucial Second Battle of El Alamein was already underway.

On 26 December, Churchill addressed a joint meeting of the US Congress. While he was well-received, he was concerned that his anti-Japanese rhetoric met with greater enthusiasm than his anti-German statements. That night, Churchill suffered a mild heart attack which was diagnosed by his physician, Lord Moran, as a coronary deficiency needing several weeks' bed rest. Churchill insisted that he did not need bed rest and, two days later, journeyed on to Ottawa by train where he gave a speech to the Canadian Parliament that included the "some chicken, some neck" line in which he recalled French predictions in 1940 that "Britain alone would have her neck wrung like a chicken". Churchill arrived home in mid-January, having flown from Bermuda to Plymouth in an American flying boat, and soon found that there was a crisis of confidence in both his coalition government and himself personally.

While he was away, the Eighth Army, having already relieved the Siege of Tobruk, had pursued Operation Crusader against Rommel's forces in Libya, successfully driving them back to a defensive position at El Agheila in Cyrenaica. On 21 January 1942, however, Rommel launched a surprise counter-attack which drove the Allies back to Gazala. Meanwhile, recent British success in the Battle of the Atlantic was compromised by the Kriegsmarine's introduction of its M4 4-rotor Enigma, whose signals could not be deciphered by Bletchley Park for nearly a year. In the Far East, the news was much worse with Japanese advances in all theatres, especially at sea and in Malaya. At a press conference in Washington, Churchill had to play down his increasing doubts about the security of Singapore.

==== Problems in Parliament and the War Cabinet ====
Churchill on his return from America was aware of parliamentary and public criticism because, after nearly two years of his premiership, the end of the war was nowhere in sight. He decided to insist upon a full three-day Commons debate, through 27–29 January, on a vote of confidence. He opened on a note of some resentment:

Since my return to this country, I have come to the conclusion that I must ask to be sustained by a vote of confidence from the House of Commons. This is a thoroughly normal, constitutional, democratic procedure. Could you have anything freer than that? Could you have any higher expression of democracy than that? Very few other countries have institutions strong enough to sustain such a thing while they are fighting for their lives. No one need be mealy-mouthed in debate, and no one should be chicken-hearted in voting.

Despite his concerns, he won easily enough with 464 votes in his favour and only one against, in a House of 640. Many MPs were unavailable for war service reasons. Churchill's gloom persisted, though, and he faced another problem when Sir Stafford Cripps returned from Moscow, where he had been British ambassador since May 1940. On the evening of Sunday, 8 February, Cripps broadcast to the nation about the Soviet war effort and compared it to the perceived "lack of urgency" in Britain where the population were almost "spectators rather than participants". This happened soon after a blazing row between Bevin and Beaverbrook which undermined the war cabinet. The latter had just become Minister of War Production but, on 19 February and citing a "nervous breakdown", he resigned from the government. He was replaced in early March by Oliver Lyttelton and the job was retitled Minister of Production. Churchill was concerned about Cripps' obvious public popularity and, sensing a challenge to his premiership, realised that he needed Cripps in the government. On 15 February, he appointed Cripps as Leader of the House of Commons and Lord Privy Seal. Attlee stepped up to become both Deputy Prime Minister and Secretary of State for Dominion Affairs.

Through the spring of 1942, Churchill's spirits rose as things settled down in cabinet and there was no especially bad news, although still a lack of triumph. He welcomed US emissaries Harry Hopkins and General George Marshall in April. They had been sent by Roosevelt to discuss the feasibility of a cross-Channel invasion, as Roosevelt was keen to take pressure off the Soviets who were still on the back foot. At this time, 1942 was practically impossible and it was hoped to open a Channel front in 1943. The Americans were focused on Europe and Churchill raised his concerns about the possible losses of both India and Egypt, but the Americans were not concerned about India. Operation Torch was still on the agenda as regards North Africa.

==== Fall of Singapore and loss of Burma ====
Churchill already had grave concerns about the fighting quality of British troops after the defeats in Norway, France, Greece and Crete. Following the fall of Singapore to the Japanese on 15 February 1942, he felt that his misgivings were confirmed and said: "(this is) the worst disaster and largest capitulation in British military history". More bad news had come on 11 February as the Kriegsmarine pulled off its audacious "Channel Dash", a massive blow to British naval prestige. The combined effect of these events was to sink Churchill's morale to its lowest point of the whole war.

Japanese operations in Burma had begun in December 1941. Rangoon fell in March 1942 and the Japanese advance gathered pace until they had occupied most of the country by the end of April. Campaigning was effectively halted through the May to December monsoon season and then the Allies mounted the first of several offensives from India. Efforts were hampered by disordered conditions in Bengal and Bihar, not least the severe cyclone which devastated the region in October 1942 and, with vital rice imports from Burma curtailed by the Japanese, led ultimately to the Bengal famine of 1943. The situation in Bengal was exacerbated by a Japanese air offensive which prevented the RAF from launching an airlift. It has been alleged that Churchill's government was wrong in its prioritisation of food exports to other theatres of war and its stockpiling of resources in Great Britain, but those policies were pursued because Churchill's main concern was fighting a war for survival. Food exports were canceled and subsequently used as famine relief. Nevertheless, he did push for whatever famine relief efforts India itself could provide, but these were hidebound by corruption and inefficiency in the Bengali government. Churchill responded by appointing Earl Wavell as Viceroy on 1 October 1943 and ordering the military under Wavell's direction to transport aid into Bengal. The combination of relief transports and a successfully harvested winter rice crop eased the famine in December 1943. The famine's death toll was around three million in total.

==== International conferences in 1942 ====
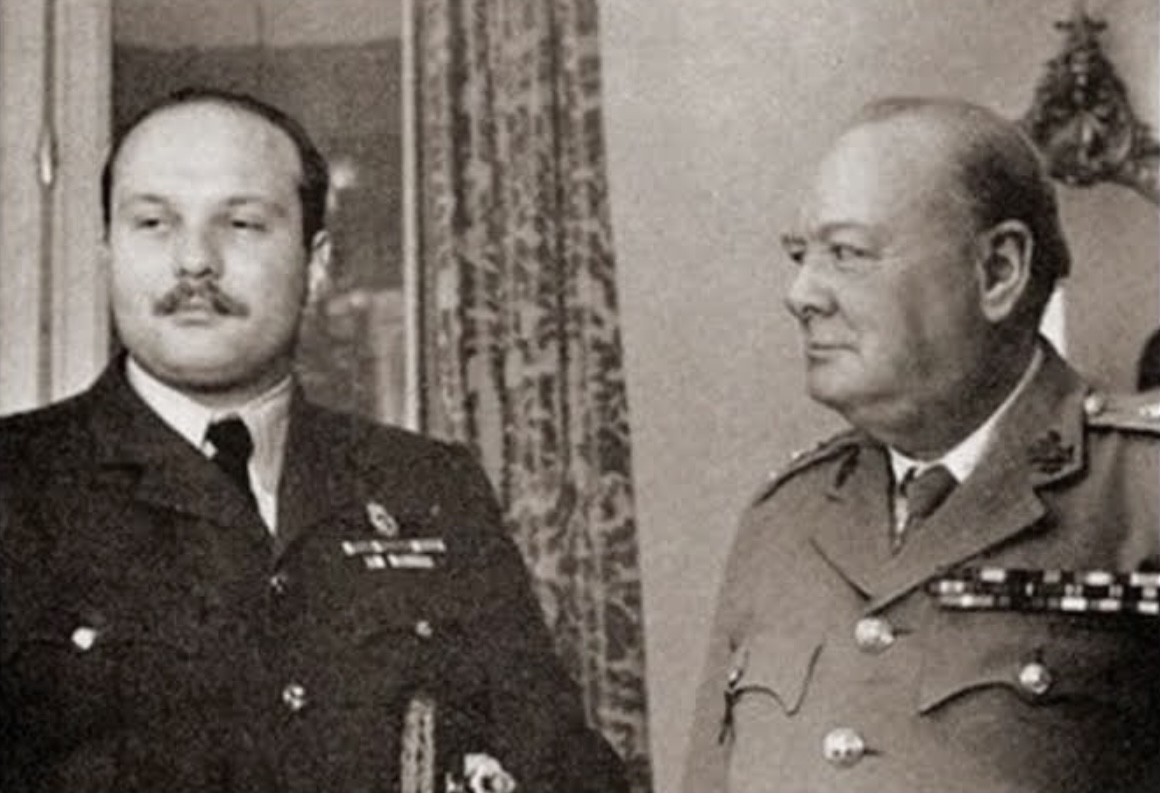
Churchill meeting King Farouk I in Cairo in December 1942

On 20 May, the Soviet Foreign Affairs minister, Vyacheslav Molotov, arrived in London and stayed until the 28th before going on to Washington. The purpose of this visit was to sign a treaty of friendship but Molotov wanted it done on the basis of certain territorial concessions re Poland and the Baltic States. Churchill and Eden worked for a compromise and eventually a twenty-year treaty was formalised but with the question of frontiers placed on hold. Molotov was also seeking a Second Front in Europe but all Churchill could do was confirm that preparations were in progress and make no promises on a date.

Churchill felt well pleased with these negotiations and said as much when he contacted Roosevelt on the 27th. The previous day, however, Rommel had launched his counter-offensive, Operation Venice, to begin the Battle of Gazala. The Allies were ultimately driven out of Libya and suffered a major defeat in the loss of Tobruk on 21 June. Churchill was with Roosevelt when the news of Tobruk reached him. He was shocked by the surrender of 35,000 troops which was, apart from Singapore, "the heaviest blow" he received in the war. The Axis advance was eventually halted at the battles of El Alamein (first battle; July) and Alam el Halfa (early September). Both sides were exhausted and in urgent need of reinforcements and supplies.

Churchill had returned to Washington on 17 June. He and Roosevelt agreed on the implementation of Operation Torch as the necessary precursor to an invasion of Europe. Roosevelt had appointed General Dwight D. Eisenhower as commanding officer of the European Theater of Operations, United States Army (ETOUSA). Having received the news from North Africa, Churchill obtained shipment from America to the Eighth Army of 300 Sherman tanks and 100 howitzers. He returned to Britain on 25 June.

Churchill came back to another motion of no confidence, this time in the central direction of the war, which meant him personally and was a direct reaction to the fall of Tobruk. The petitioners were a cross-party spread. The debate was held 1–2 July and opened with the news that Rommel was only forty miles from Alexandria while, the previous week, the government had lost a bye-election to an independent candidate, the first of several in which Conservative majorities were overturned. Jenkins describes the rebel motion in Parliament as "a fiasco", its speakers not being co-ordinated. One of them, the seconder of the motion who was targeting the Chiefs of Staff, even declared that it would be a "deplorable disaster" if Churchill had to go. Even so, 25 votes were cast against Churchill, with 477 in favour, and he drew some comfort from being told that the government of William Pitt the Younger conceded 25 votes after a similar debate in 1799.

In August, despite health concerns, Churchill visited the British forces in North Africa, raising morale in the process, en route to Moscow for his first meeting with Stalin. He was accompanied by Roosevelt's special envoy Averell Harriman. He was in Moscow 12–16 August and had four lengthy meetings with Stalin. Although they got along quite well together on a personal level, there was little chance of any real progress given the state of the war with the Germans still advancing in all theatres. Stalin was desperate for the Allies to open the Second Front in Europe, as Churchill had discussed with Molotov in May, and the answer was the same.

==== Turn of the tide: El Alamein and Stalingrad ====
While he was in Cairo in early August, Churchill decided to replace Field Marshal Auchinleck with Field Marshal Alexander as Commander-in-Chief of the Middle East Theatre. Command of the Eighth Army was given to General William Gott but he was killed only three days later and General Montgomery replaced him. Churchill returned to Cairo from Moscow on 17 August and could see for himself that the Alexander/Montgomery combination was already having an effect. He returned to England on the 21st, nine days before Rommel launched his final offensive.

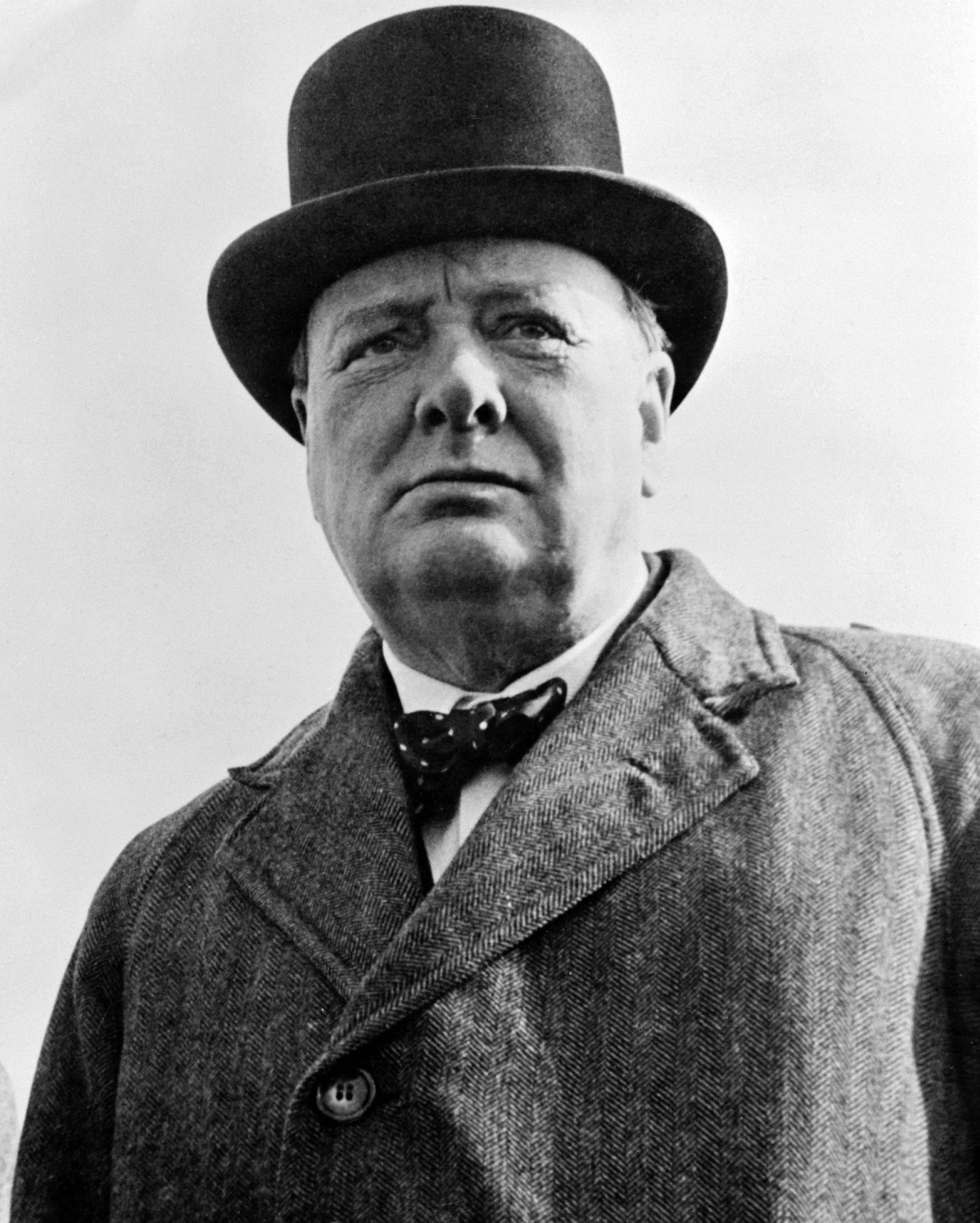
Churchill in 1942

As 1942 drew to a close, the tide of war began to turn with Allied victory in the key battles of El Alamein and Stalingrad. Until November, the Allies had always been on the defensive, but from November, the Germans were. Churchill ordered the church bells to be rung throughout Great Britain for the first time since early 1940. On 10 November, knowing that El Alamein was a victory, he delivered one of his most memorable war speeches to the Lord Mayor's Luncheon at the Mansion House in London, in response to the Allied victory at El Alamein:

This is not the end. It is not even the beginning of the end. But it is, perhaps, the end of the beginning.

El Alamein was fought 23 October to 11 November and was a resounding victory for the Eighth Army with Rommel's forces in full retreat. The Americans under Eisenhower had successfully completed Torch on 8 November and the Afrika Korps was now facing formidable opposition on two fronts. The conflict at Stalingrad lasted for over five months but the key date was 23 November when the Germans were encircled.

==== International conferences in 1943 ====
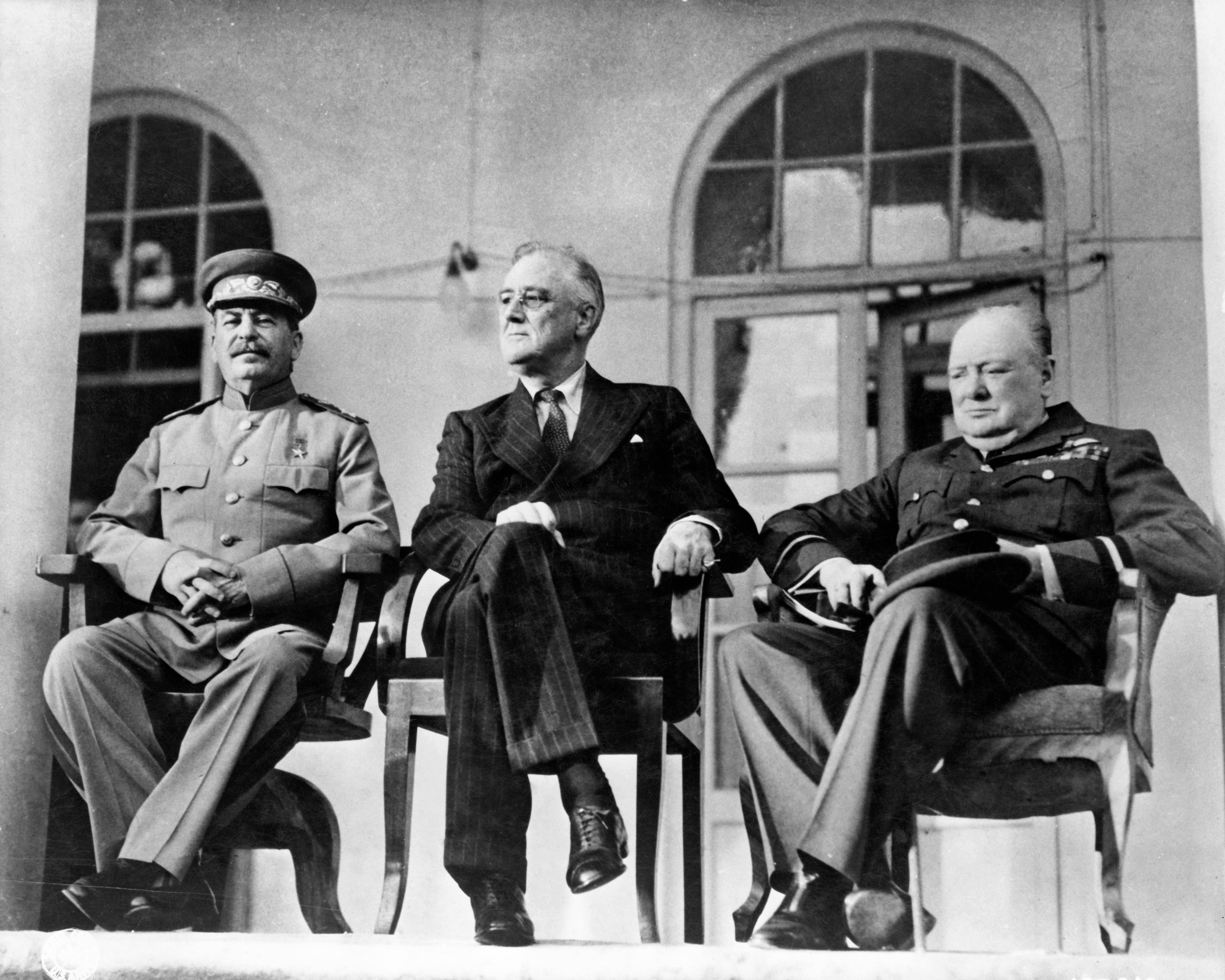
Stalin, Roosevelt and Churchill in Tehran.

Generalissimo Chiang Kai-shek, President Franklin D. Roosevelt, and Churchill at the first Cairo Conference in November 1943.

In January 1943, Churchill met Roosevelt at the Casablanca Conference (codename Symbol), which lasted ten days. It was also attended by General Charles de Gaulle on behalf of the Free French Forces. Stalin had hoped to attend but declined because of the situation at Stalingrad. Although Churchill expressed doubts on the matter, the so-called Casablanca Declaration committed the Allies to securing "unconditional surrender" by the Axis powers. From Morocco, Churchill went to Cairo, Adana, Cyprus, Cairo again and Algiers for various purposes. He arrived home on 7 February having been out of the country for nearly a month. He addressed the Commons on the 11th and then became seriously ill with pneumonia the following day, necessitating more than one month of rest, recuperation and convalescence – for the latter, he moved to Chequers. He returned to work in London on 15 March.

Churchill made two transatlantic crossings during the year, meeting Roosevelt at both the third Washington Conference (codename Trident) in May and the first Quebec Conference (codename Quadrant) in August. In November, Churchill and Roosevelt met Chinese Generalissimo Chiang Kai-shek at the Cairo Conference (codename Sextant).

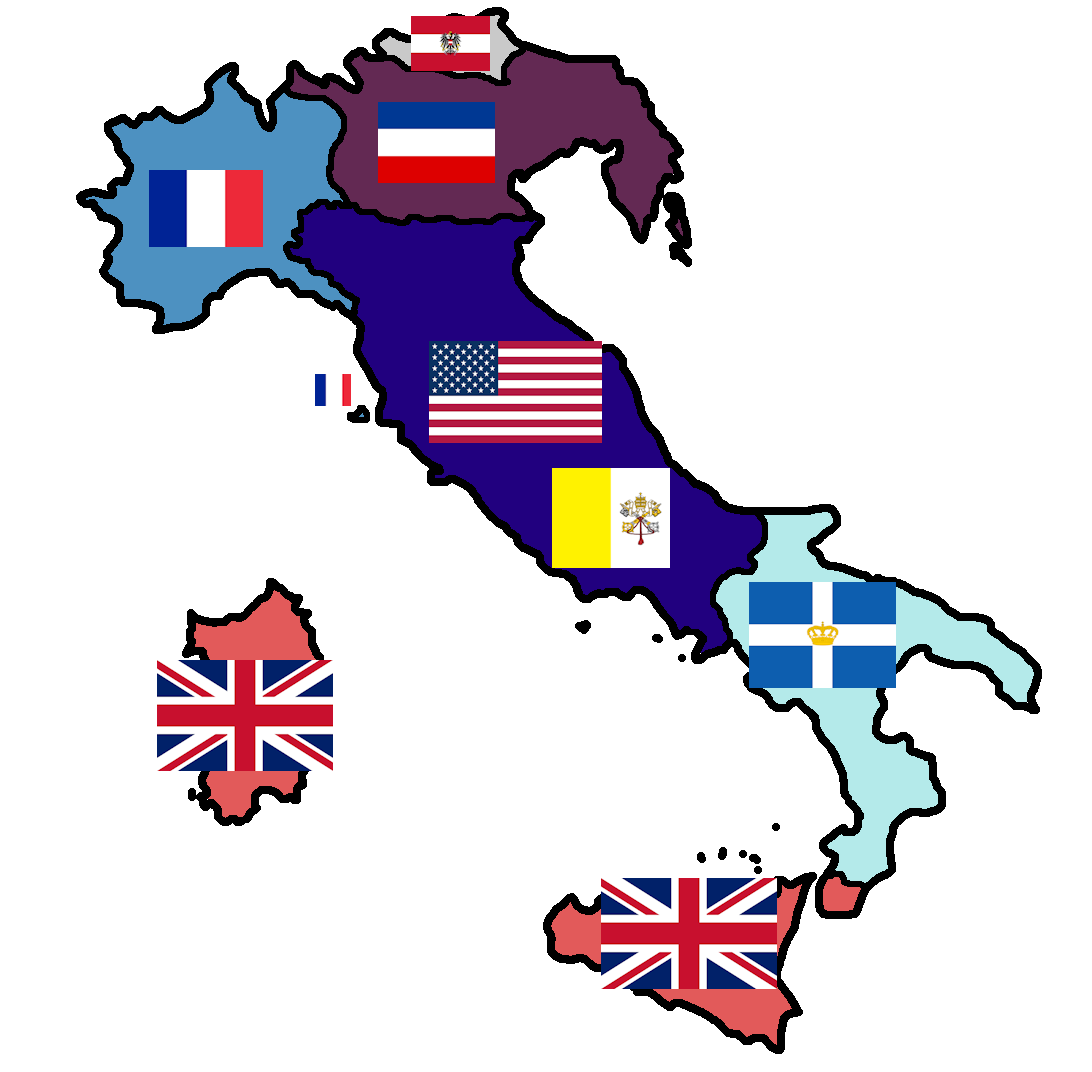
Map of the proposal on Italy brought up by Churchill in the Tehran Conference, in November 1943.

The most important conference of the year was soon afterwards (28 November to 1 December) at Tehran (codename Eureka), where Churchill and Roosevelt met Stalin in the first of the "Big Three" meetings, preceding those at Yalta and Potsdam in 1945. Stalin judged Churchill to be "more formidable" than Roosevelt. Roosevelt and Stalin co-operated in persuading Churchill to commit to the opening of a second front in western Europe and it was also agreed that Germany would be divided after the war, but no firm decisions were made about how. He also proposed a plan to partition Italy into specific occupation zones to be administrated by the UK (Ruling Sardinia, Sicily and the Strait of Messina), France (Ruling the Aosta Valley, Liguria, Piedmont, the Elba island and parts of Lombardy), Yugoslavia (Ruling Istria, Friuli-Venezia-Giulia, Trentino, parts of Lombardy and Veneto) a joint USA-Vatican occupation zone (Ruling over Emilia-Romagna, Lazio, Umbria, Marche, Abruzzo, Molise, Tuscany and parts of Campania), a Greek occupation zone (Ruling over Apulia, Basilicata, most of Calabria and parts of Campania) and most of South Tyrol would be given back to Austria (The proposal was rejected by Roosevelt and Stalin). Churchill would stay confident in a punitive peace towards Italy up until 1945. On their way back from Tehran, Churchill and Roosevelt held a second Cairo conference with Turkish president İsmet İnönü, but were unable to gain any commitment from Turkey to join the Allies.

Churchill went from Cairo to Tunis, arriving on 10 December, initially as Eisenhower's guest (soon afterwards, Eisenhower took over as Supreme Allied Commander of the new SHAEF just being created in London). While Churchill was in Tunis, he became seriously ill with atrial fibrillation and was forced to remain until after Christmas while a succession of specialists were drafted in to ensure his recovery. Clementine and Colville arrived to keep him company; Colville had just returned to Downing Street after more than two years in the RAF. On 27 December, the party went on to Marrakesh for convalescence. Feeling much better, Churchill flew to Gibraltar on 14 January 1944 and sailed home on the King George V. He was back in London on the morning of 18 January and surprised MPs by attending Prime Minister's Questions in the Commons that afternoon. Since 12 January 1943, when he set off for the Casablanca Conference, Churchill had been abroad and/or seriously ill for 203 of the 371 days.

==== Invasions of Sicily and Italy ====
In the autumn of 1942, after Churchill's meeting with Stalin in Moscow, he was approached by Eisenhower, commanding North African Theater of Operations (NATOUSA), and his aides on the subject of where the Western Allies should launch their first strike in Europe. According to General Mark Clark, who later commanded the United States Fifth Army in the Italian campaign, the Americans openly admitted that a cross-Channel operation in the near future was "utterly impossible". As an alternative, Churchill recommended "slit(ting) the soft belly of the Mediterranean" and persuaded them to invade first Sicily and then Italy after they had defeated the Afrika Korps in North Africa. After the war, Clark still agreed that Churchill's analysis was correct but he added that, when the Allies landed at Salerno, they found that Italy was "a tough old gut".

The invasion of Sicily began on 9 July and was successfully completed by 17 August. Churchill was then all for driving straight up the Italian mainland with Rome as the main target, but the Americans wanted to withdraw several divisions to England in the build-up of forces for Operation Overlord, now scheduled for the spring of 1944. Churchill was still not keen on Overlord as he feared that an Anglo-American army in France might not be a match for the fighting efficiency of the Wehrmacht. He preferred peripheral operations, including a plan called Jupiter for an invasion of northern Norway. Events in Sicily had an unexpected impact in Italy. King Victor Emmanuel sacked Mussolini on 25 July and appointed Marshal Badoglio as prime minister. Badoglio opened negotiations with the Allies which resulted in the Armistice of Cassibile on 3 September. In response, the Germans activated Operation Achse and took control of most of Italy. Although he still preferred Italy to Normandy as the Allies' main route into the Third Reich, Churchill was deeply concerned about the strong German resistance at Salerno and, later, after the Allies successfully gained their bridgehead at Anzio but still failed to break the stalemate, he caustically said that instead of "hurling a wildcat onto the shore", the Allied force had become a "stranded whale". The big obstacle was Monte Cassino and it was not until mid-May 1944 when it was finally overcome, enabling the Allies to at last advance on Rome, which was taken on 4 June.

==== Preparations for D-Day ====
The difficulties in Italy caused Churchill to have a change of heart and mind about Allied strategy to the extent that, when the Anzio stalemate developed soon after his return to England from North Africa, he threw himself into the planning of Overlord and set up an ongoing series of meetings with SHAEF and the British Chiefs of Staff over which he regularly presided. These were always attended by either Eisenhower or his chief of staff General Walter Bedell Smith. Churchill was especially taken by the Mulberry project but he was also keen to make the most of Allied air power which, by the beginning of 1944, had become overwhelming. Churchill never fully lost his apprehension about the invasion, however, and underwent great fluctuation of mood as D-Day approached. Jenkins says that he faced potential victory with much less buoyancy than when he defiantly faced the prospect of defeat four years earlier.

==== Need for post-war reform ====
Churchill could not ignore the need for post-war reforms covering a broad sweep of areas such as agriculture, education, employment, health, housing and welfare. The Beveridge Report with its five "Giant Evils" was published in November 1942 and assumed great importance amid widespread popular acclaim. Even so, Churchill was not really interested because he was focused on winning the war and saw reform in terms of tidying up afterwards. His attitude was demonstrated in a Sunday evening radio broadcast on 26 March 1944. He was obliged to devote most of it to the subject of reform and showed a distinct lack of interest. In their respective diaries, Colville said Churchill had broadcast "indifferently" and Harold Nicolson said that, to many people, Churchill came across the air as "a worn and petulant old man".

In the end, however, it was the population's demand for reform that decided the 1945 general election. Labour was perceived as the party that would deliver Beveridge. Arthur Greenwood had initiated its preceding social insurance and allied services inquiry in June 1941. Attlee, Bevin and Labour's other coalition ministers through the war were seen to be working towards reform and earned the trust of the electorate.

=== Defeat of Germany: June 1944 to May 1945 ===
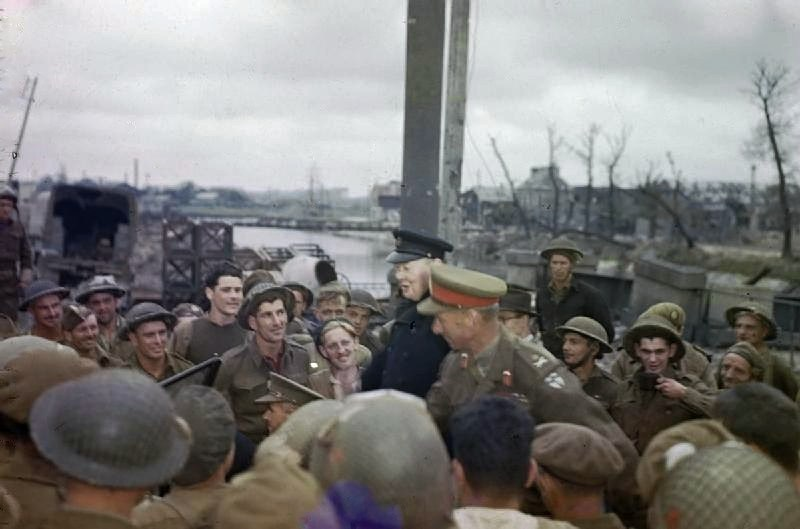
Churchill visits the troops in Normandy, 1944.

==== D-Day: Allied invasion of Normandy ====
Churchill was determined to be actively involved in the Normandy invasion and hoped to cross the Channel on D-Day itself (6 June 1944) or at least on D-Day+1. His desire caused unnecessary consternation at SHAEF until he was effectively vetoed by the King who told Churchill that, as head of all three services, he (the King) ought to go too. Churchill expected an Allied death toll of 20,000 on D-Day but he was proved to be pessimistic because less than 8,000 died in the whole of June. He made his first visit to Normandy on 12 June to visit Montgomery, whose HQ was then about five miles inland. That evening, as he was returning to London, the first V-1 flying bombs were launched. In a longer visit to Normandy on 22–23 July, Churchill went to Cherbourg and Arromanches where he saw the Mulberry Harbour.

==== Quebec Conference, September 1944 ====
Churchill met Roosevelt at the Second Quebec Conference (codename Octagon) from 12 to 16 September 1944. Between themselves, they reached agreement on the Morgenthau Plan for the Allied occupation of Germany after the war, the intention of which was not only to demilitarise but also de-industrialise Germany. Eden strongly opposed it and was later able to persuade Churchill to disown it. US Secretary of State Cordell Hull also opposed it and convinced Roosevelt that it was infeasible.

==== Moscow Conference, October 1944 ====
At the fourth Moscow conference (codename Tolstoy) from 9 to 19 October 1944, Churchill and Eden met Stalin and Molotov. This conference has gained notoriety for the so-called "Percentages agreement" in which Churchill and Stalin effectively agreed the post-war fate of the Balkans. By that time, the Soviet armies were in Romania and Bulgaria. Churchill suggested a scale of predominance throughout the whole region so as not to, as he put it, "get at cross-purposes in small ways". He wrote down some suggested percentages of influence per country and gave it to Stalin who ticked it. The agreement was that Russia would have 90% control of Romania and 75% control of Bulgaria. The UK and the USA would have 90% control of Greece. Hungary and Yugoslavia would be 50% each. In 1958, five years after the account of this meeting was published (in Churchill's The Second World War), Soviet authorities denied that Stalin had accepted such an "imperialist proposal".

==== Yalta Conference, February 1945 ====
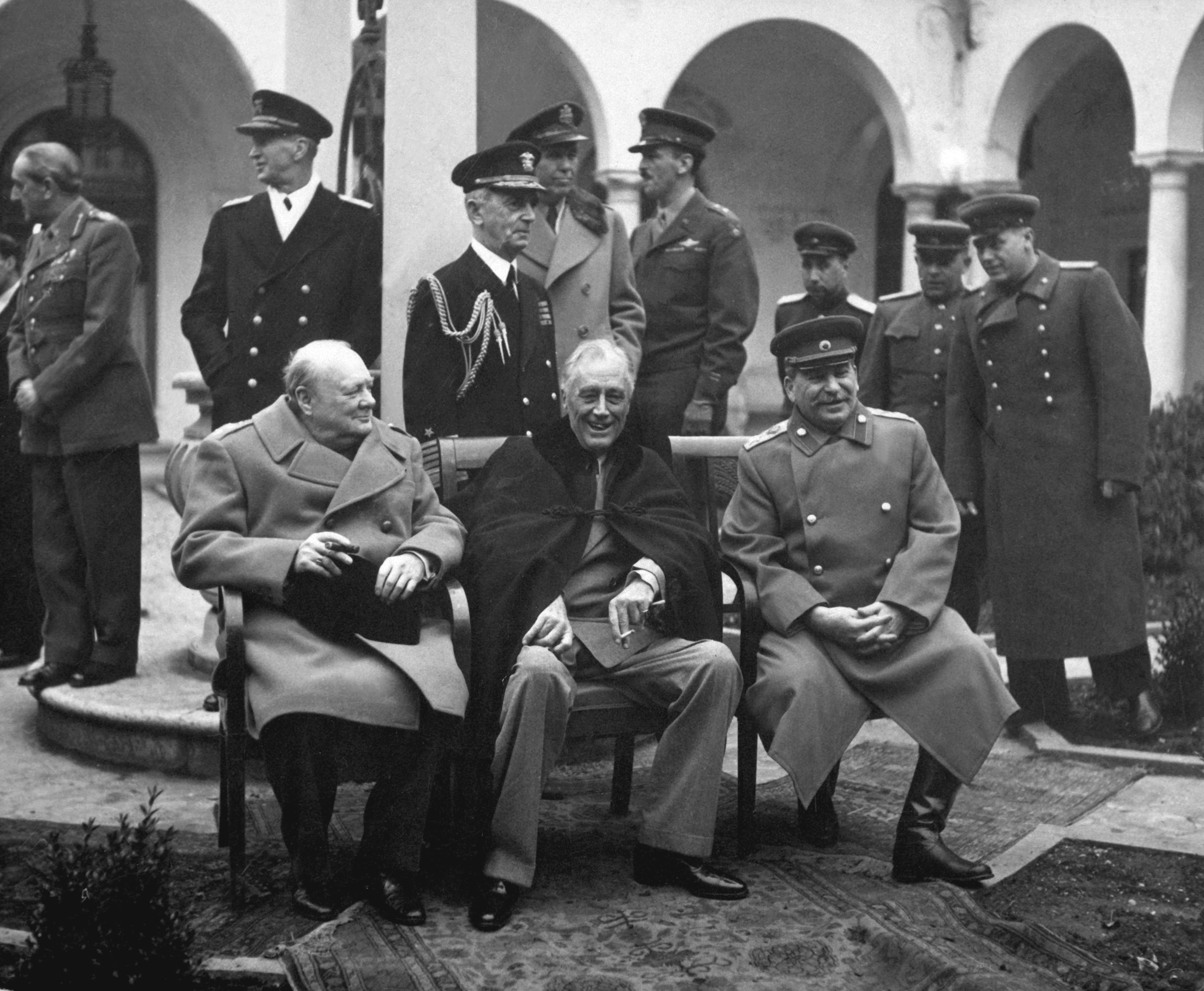
Churchill, Roosevelt, and Stalin at the Yalta Conference, February 1945.

From 30 January to 2 February 1945, Churchill and Roosevelt met for their Malta Conference ahead of the second "Big Three" event at Yalta from 4 to 11 February. Yalta had massive implications for the post-war world. There were two predominant issues: the question of setting up the United Nations Organisation after the war, on which much progress was made; and the more vexed question of Poland's post-war status, which Churchill saw as a test case for the future of Eastern Europe. Churchill faced some strong criticism for the Yalta agreement on Poland. For example, 27 Tory MPs voted against him when the matter was debated in the Commons at the end of the month. Jenkins, however, maintains that Churchill did as well as he could have done in very difficult circumstances, not least the fact that Roosevelt was seriously ill and could not provide Churchill with meaningful support.

Following the Yalta Conference, the Allies initiated a program of mandatory repatriation for Soviet citizens; 4.2 million Soviet prisoners of war, Ostarbeiters, and collaborators were transferred from both Soviet and Western occupation zones. While most returned voluntarily, Western forces coerced those resisting, including the British handover of Cossacks in 1945 and Operation Keelhaul in 1946–1947. Declassified archives disprove Cold-war era claims of immediate, widespread persecution of the returnees. 58% of repatriates were cleared to return home, while officials drafted 33.5% into the Red Army or labor battalions and transferred 6.5% to NKVD filtration camps. Rank-and-file collaborators were processed administratively and sent into exile to special settlements; courts sentenced officers or high-ranking collaborators to the Gulag. Many returnees faced life-long social stigma.

==== Dresden bombings controversy ====
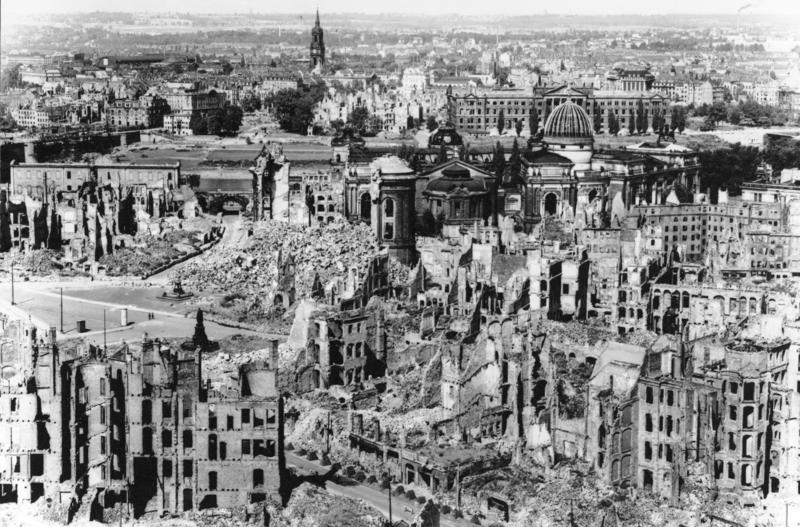
The destruction of Dresden, February 1945.

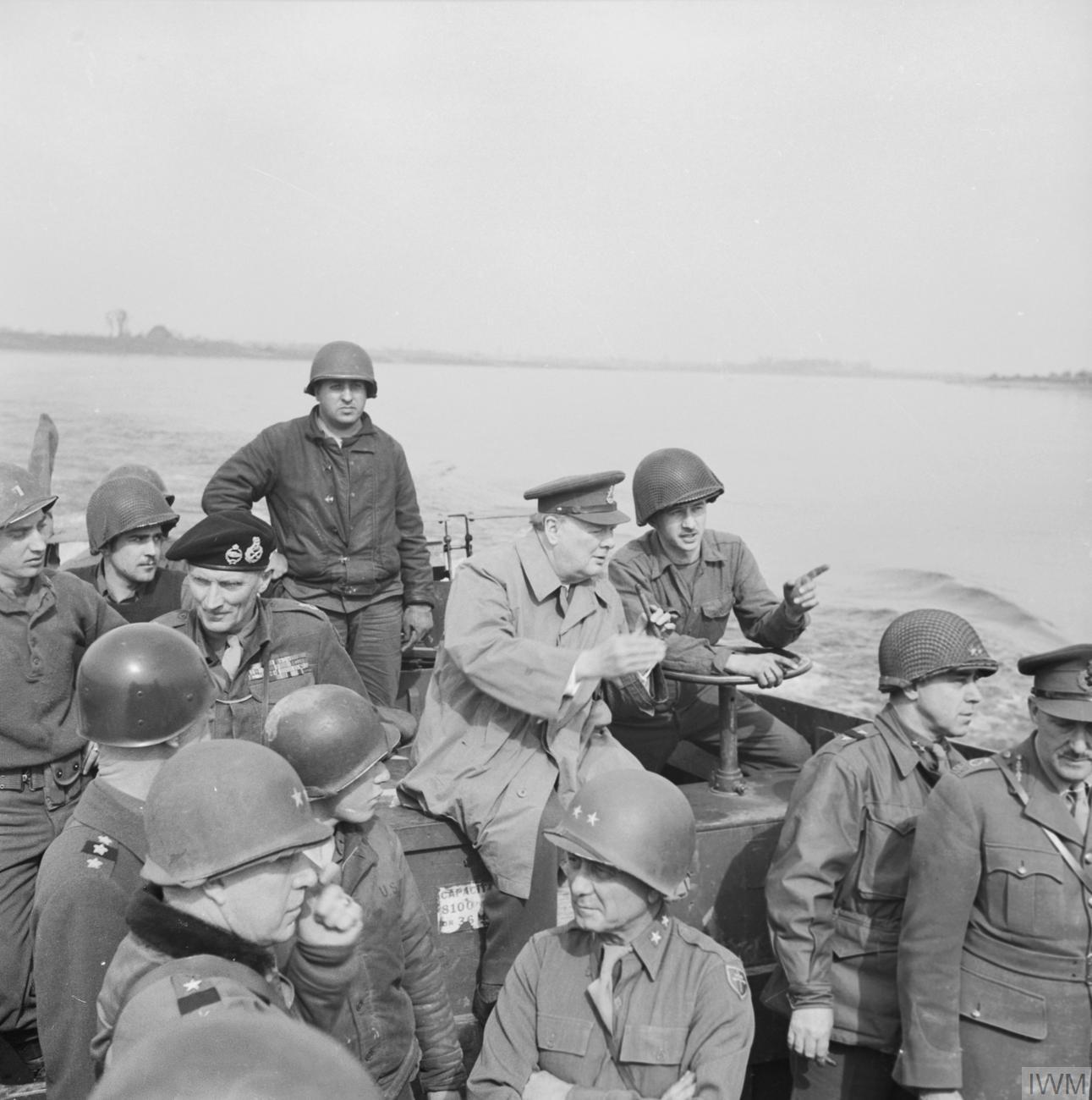
Churchill's crossing of the Rhine river in Germany, during Operation Plunder on 25 March 1945.

On the nights of 13–15 February 1945, some 1,200 British and US bombers attacked the German city of Dresden, which was crowded with wounded and refugees from the Eastern Front. The attacks were part of an area bombing campaign that was initiated by Churchill in January with the intention of shortening the war. Churchill came to regret the bombing because initial reports suggested an excessive number of civilian casualties close to the end of the war, though an independent commission in 2010 confirmed a death toll between 22,700 and 25,000. On 28 March, he decided to restrict area bombing and sent a memorandum to General Ismay for the Chiefs of Staff Committee:

The destruction of Dresden remains a serious query against the conduct of Allied bombing..... I feel the need for more precise concentration upon military objectives..... rather than on mere acts of terror and wanton destruction, however impressive.

British historian Frederick Taylor has pointed out that the number of Soviet citizens who died from German bombing was roughly equivalent to the number of German citizens who died from Allied raids. Jenkins asks if Churchill was moved more by foreboding than by regret but admits it is easy to criticise with the hindsight of victory. He adds that the area bombing campaign was no more reprehensible than President Truman's use of the second atomic bomb on Nagasaki six months later. Andrew Marr, quoting Max Hastings, says that Churchill's memorandum was a "calculated political attempt..... to distance himself..... from the rising controversy surrounding the area offensive".

==== Syrian crisis ====
In April, General Charles de Gaulle, as head of the French Provisional Government, had ordered French forces to establish an air base in Syria and a naval base in Lebanon. This action provoked a nationalist outbreak in both countries and France responded with an armed intervention, leading to many civilian deaths. With the situation escalating out of control, Churchill intervened on 31 May and gave de Gaulle an ultimatum to desist. This was ignored and British forces from Transjordan were mobilised to restore order. The French, heavily outnumbered, had no option but to return to their bases. A diplomatic row broke out and Churchill reportedly told a colleague that de Gaulle was "a great danger to peace and for Great Britain".

==== VE Day and after ====
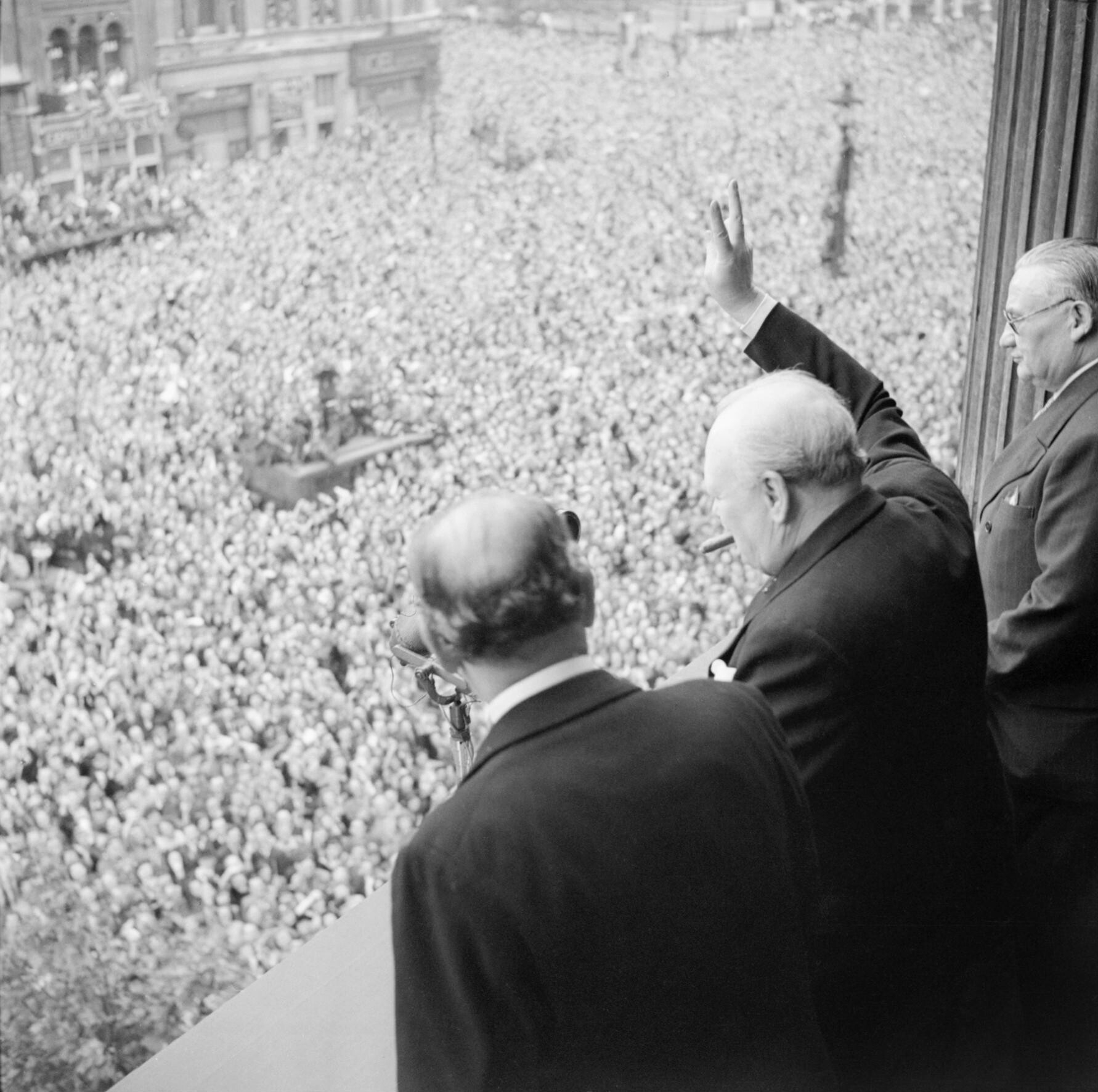
Churchill waving the Victory sign to the crowd in Whitehall on the day he broadcast to the nation that the war with Germany had been won, 8 May 1945. Ernest Bevin stands to his right.

On 7 May 1945 at the SHAEF headquarters in Reims the Allies accepted Germany's surrender. The next day was Victory in Europe Day (VE Day) when Churchill broadcast to the nation that Germany had surrendered and that a final ceasefire on all fronts in Europe would come into effect at one minute past midnight that night (i.e., on the 9th). Afterwards, Churchill went to Buckingham Palace where he appeared on the balcony with the Royal Family before a huge crowd of celebrating citizens. He went from the palace to Whitehall where he addressed another large crowd:

God bless you all. This is your victory. In our long history, we have never seen a greater day than this. Everyone, man or woman, has done their best.

At this point he asked Ernest Bevin to come forward and share the applause. Bevin said: "No, Winston, this is your day", and proceeded to conduct the people in the singing of For He's a Jolly Good Fellow. In the evening, Churchill made another broadcast to the nation asserting that the defeat of Japan would follow in the coming months (the Japanese surrendered on 15 August 1945).

With a general election looming (there had been none for almost a decade), and with the Labour ministers refusing to continue the wartime coalition, Churchill resigned as prime minister on 23 May 1945. Later that day, he accepted the King's invitation to form a new government, known officially as the National Government, like the Conservative-dominated coalition of the 1930s, but in practice known as the Churchill caretaker ministry. Polling day was 5 July, but the results of the 1945 election did not become known until 26 July, owing to the need to collect the votes of those serving overseas. The result was a landslide victory for Labour so Churchill resigned as prime minister and was succeeded by Clement Attlee. Churchill had been unopposed by the major parties in Woodford, his new constituency in Essex, but his majority over a sole independent candidate was much less than expected. On hearing the Woodford result, he gloomily anticipated national defeat by Labour and, when Clementine suggested that it might be "a blessing in disguise", he retorted that "at the moment it seems very effectively disguised".

== Historical reputation ==
In surveys of ranking of British prime ministers, Churchill is consistently ranked in the top of rankings, often as the greatest prime minister in British history. A 1999 study by 20 prominent historians, politicians and commentators by BBC Radio 4 ranked Churchill number one, compounded by 2008, 2010 and 2020 polls, while 2004 and 2006 polls placed him second.

== See also ==
- Charles de Gaulle during World War II
