= Winston Churchill's address to the United States Congress (1943) =

WWII-era speech in Washington, D.C.

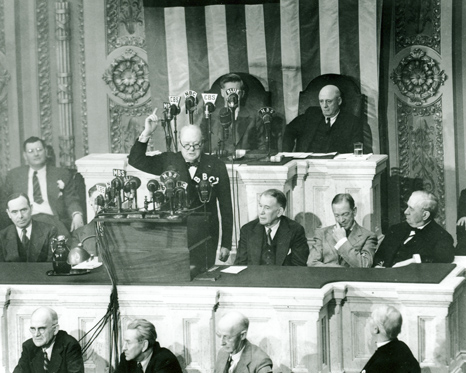
Winston Churchill addressing joint session of Congress, 1943

British Prime Minister Winston Churchill's 1943 address to Congress took place May 19 at 12:30 p.m. EWT before a joint meeting of the United States Senate and House of Representatives, roughly a year and a half after his 1941 speech to the same body. He noted that some 500 days had passed since then, during which the two Allies had been fighting "shoulder to shoulder." Sometimes called Churchill's Fighting Speech, the 55-minute address was made while Churchill and other Allied leaders were in Washington for the Trident Conference, which was organized to plan what became Operation Overlord.

Sure I am that this day, now, we are the masters of our fate. That the task which has been set us is not above our strength. That its pangs and toils are not beyond our endurance. As long as we have faith in our cause, and an unconquerable willpower, salvation will not be denied us.

— Churchill

Churchill received strong applause for a promise of active British participation in the Pacific War, which was taking a toll on the United States Navy and Marine Corps. The New York Times correspondent W.H. Lawrence reported that "it was apparent from the press gallery that his promise of joint action to reduce the cities and munitions centers of Japan to ashes has been heavily underlined for emphasis." This emphasis was thought to be in response to a recent speech by Senator A.B. "Happy" Chandler of Kentucky, in which he suggested that once Hitler was out of the way, the British would abandon the Americans to manage Imperial Japan alone. Churchill also thanked the U.S. for rapid supply of Sherman tanks to Commonwealth troops in North Africa following the fall of Tobruk.

Churchill also made a point to honor Soviet resilience in the face of Hitler's insatiable hunger for Lebensraum. As an Australian newspaper recounted, "The Russians were holding at present 190 German and 28 satellite divisions on their front, compared with the equivalent of about 15 divisions the Allies had destroyed in Tunisia after a campaign costing the Allies 50,000 casualties. That gave some measure of Russia's effort and the debt the Allies owed her." The unequal burden that had fallen on the Soviets was a major point of discussion during the ongoing Trident Conference. Some observers speculated that Churchill was laying the groundwork for a request to Stalin that Soviet airbases close to the Pacific Ocean be opened for eventual bombing runs against Japanese home islands.

Churchill also met privately with members of the House and Senate Committees on Foreign Relations.

In addition to the usual American legislators, judges and diplomats, the speech was attended by the Prime Minister of Canada, Mackenzie King; three British military officers assigned to India, Archibald P. Wavell, James Somerville, and Richard Pierse; the abdicated ex-King of England and his wife; Princess Märtha of Sweden and Norway; and the British Ambassador to the U.S., Edward Halifax, along with his son Lt. Richard Wood, who had recently lost both his legs in combat at Tripoli. Lt. Wood was welcomed by Connecticut Rep. William Miller, a double-amputee veteran of World War I.

A Norfolk, Virginia newspaper columnist reported that there were 1,100 people present in chamber, twice capacity, and that between 5,000 and 20,000 spectators had assembled outside the United States Capitol in anticipation of Churchill's arrival. He noted, "If the volume of cheers that greeted the Prime Minister on his approach is any criterion, it is closer to the latter number. I stood by a score of Britishers and half them had tears in their eyes when that cheer went up." The speech was broadcast in the States by all four major American radio networks (meaning ABC, NBC, CBS, and MBS). A market-research firm estimated that 14 million Americans tuned into the speech on the radio, roughly equivalent to the radio audience for Roosevelt's January 7 speech opening the 78th Congress.

Observers described the speech as more confident (verging on boastful) and more jocular than was typical of wartime Churchill, with less "soaring oratory."

All this gives the lie to the Nazi and Fascist talk that the parliamentary democracies are incapable of waging an effective war. We will punish them with further examples.

— Churchill

In response to the speech, the Nazi German press office Deutsches Nachrichtenbüro released a statement to the effect that "Churchill's declaration that this war must be waged to the very end, whatever the cost, is typical for him and for his attitude to all problems."

== See also ==
- List of joint sessions of the United States Congress § 1940s
- Winston Churchill in the Second World War
- Winston Churchill's address to Congress (1941)
- Winston Churchill's address to Congress (1952)
