= Herbert Deskins =

American politician

Herbie Deskins

Member of the Kentucky House of Representatives from the 94th district
- In office January 1, 1976 – January 1, 1999
- Preceded by: Lee Roberts
- Succeeded by: Ira Branham

Personal details
- Born: November 26, 1943 (age 82) Radford, Virginia
- Party: Democratic

Herbert "Herbie" Deskins Jr. (born November 26, 1943) is an American politician in the state of Kentucky. He served in the Kentucky House of Representatives as a Democrat from 1976 to 1999. He was first elected to the house in 1975, defeating freshman incumbent Lee Roberts for renomination. He retired from the house in 1998.
