= History of the Conservative Party (UK) =

Aspect of British political history

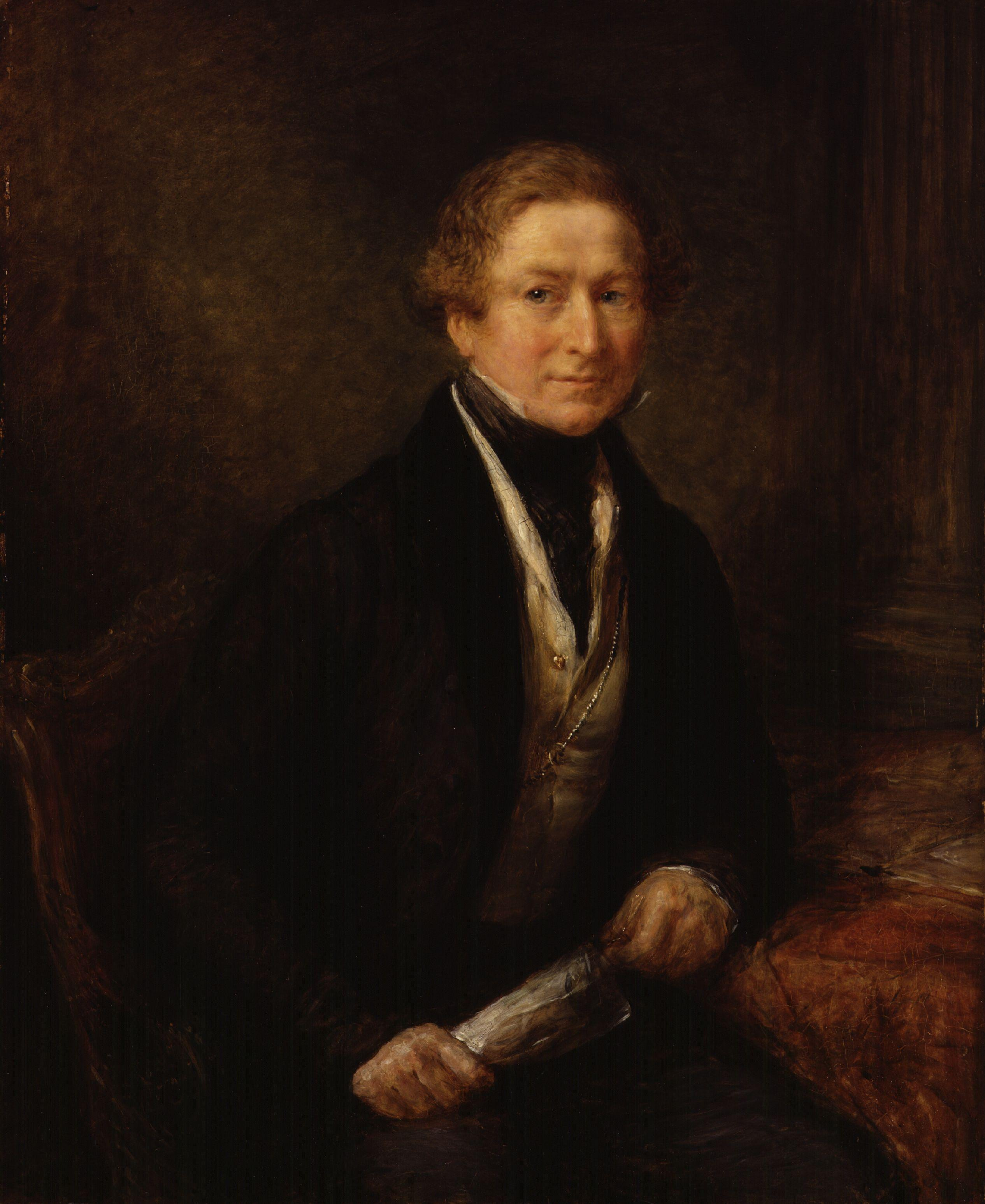
Robert Peel was the founder and first Conservative Party Prime Minister.

The Conservative Party (also known as Tories) is the oldest political party in the United Kingdom, and one of the oldest in the world. The modern party was first organised in the 1830s and the name "Conservative" was officially adopted but it is still often referred to as the Tory party (not least because newspaper editors find it a convenient shorthand when space is limited). The Tories had been a coalition that often formed the government from 1760 until the Reform Act 1832. Modernising reformers said the traditionalistic party of "Throne, Altar and Cottage" was obsolete; in the face of an expanding electorate from the 1830s to 1860s, it held its strength among royalists, devout Anglicans, and landlords and their tenants.

Widening of the franchise in the 19th century led the party to popularise its approach, especially under Benjamin Disraeli, whose Reform Act 1867 greatly increased the electorate. After 1886, the Conservatives allied with the part of the Liberal Party known as the Liberal Unionists who opposed their party's support for Irish Home Rule and together they held office for all but three of the following twenty years. Lord Salisbury's and Arthur Balfour's governments between 1895 and 1906 were given the name of "Unionist". The Conservative Party was also known as the Unionist Party in the early 20th century. In 1909, the Conservative Party was renamed the Conservative and Unionist Party, and in May 1912 it formally merged with the Liberal Unionists.

The First World War saw the formation of an all-party coalition government and for four years after the armistice the Unionist Party remained in coalition with the Lloyd George Liberals. Eventually, grassroots pressure forced the breakup of the coalition and the party regained power on its own, but after the separation of the Irish Free State in 1922 it increasingly used the name "Conservative" more than "Unionist". It again dominated the political scene in the inter-war period from 1931 in a National Government as its main rivals, the Liberals and the ascending Labour Party, virtually collapsed. The party pursued protective tariffs and low taxes during the depression years of the 1930s. In foreign policy, it favoured peace and appeasement of Italy and Germany until 1939. In the late 1930s, it supported a hurried rearmament program to catch up with Germany. The crisis came in 1940 as Germany defeated France and Britain and its Commonwealth stood alone against Adolf Hitler. The result was a wartime all-party coalition government with partisanship in abeyance. In the 1945 UK general election, the party lost power in a landslide by the Labour Party.

The Conservatives largely accepted the reality of the Labour government's nationalisation programme, the creation of the welfare state and the taxes required for it. When they returned to power in 1951, the party oversaw an economic boom and ever-increasing national prosperity throughout the 1950s. The party stumbled in the 1960s and 1970s; in 1975, Margaret Thatcher became leader and converted it to a monetarist economic programme. Following Thatcher's election victory in 1979, her government became known for its free market approach to problems and privatisation of public utilities. The Conservatives experienced a high-point, with Thatcher leading the Conservatives to two more landslide election victories in 1983 and 1987. Towards the end of the 1980s Thatcher's increasing unpopularity within the parliamentary party and unwillingness to change policies perceived as vote-losing led to her being deposed in 1990 and replaced by John Major, who won an unexpected election victory in 1992. Major's government suffered a political blow with Black Wednesday when the Pound Sterling was forced out of the European Exchange Rate Mechanism later that year, which lost the party much of its reputation for good financial stewardship. Although the country's economy recovered in the mid-1990s, an effective opposition campaign by the Labour Party led to a landslide defeat in 1997. The party under David Cameron returned to government with the Cameron–Clegg coalition following the 2010 UK general election. In the 2015 UK general election, the Conservatives managed to win a majority and saw Cameron return to power for a second term. The 2017 UK general election saw the Conservatives lose their majority and form a confidence and supply agreement with the Democratic Unionist Party. Under the leadership of Boris Johnson, the Conservatives were able to regain their majority during the 2019 UK general election, their largest ever since the Thatcher years.

== 19th century ==
=== Origins ===
The modern Conservative Party arose in the 1830s, emerging from the Tory party that had formed about 1812, a key moment of the transition coming with the Tamworth Manifesto of 1834. Political alignments in those centuries were much looser than now, with many individual groupings. From the 1780s until the 1820s the dominant grouping was those Whigs following William Pitt the Younger. From about 1812 on the name "Tory" was commonly used for a new party called by the historian Robert Blake "the ancestors of 'Conservatism.'". Blake adds that Pitt's successors after 1812 "Were not in any sense standard-bearers of 'true Toryism.'" Pitt never used the term 'Tory'. In the late 1820s, disputes over political reform, especially Roman Catholic Emancipation, broke up this grouping. A government led by the Duke of Wellington collapsed in 1831 amidst a Whig landslide. Now in the minority, Robert Peel set about assembling a new coalition of forces. Peel issued the Tamworth Manifesto in 1834 which set out the basic principles of Conservatism, and later that year he formed a short-lived government. On the fall of Lord Melbourne's government after a Whig electoral defeat in 1841 Peel took office with a substantial majority and appeared set for a long rule.

=== Crisis over the Corn Laws ===
In 1846 disaster struck the Conservatives when the party split over the repeal of the Corn Laws. Peel and most senior Conservatives favoured repeal, but they were opposed by backbench members representing farming and rural constituencies, led by Lord George Bentinck, Benjamin Disraeli, and Lord Stanley (later the Earl of Derby), who favoured protectionism. Following repeal, the Protectionists combined with the Whigs to overthrow Peel's government. It would be twenty-eight years before a Conservative prime minister again had a majority in the House of Commons.

From this point on, and especially after the death of Peel in 1850, the Peelites and Conservatives drifted apart. Most of the Peelites joined with the Whigs and Radicals to form the Liberal Party in 1859, under the leadership of Lord Palmerston.

=== Recovery and triumph under Derby and Disraeli ===
The Conservatives survived as an independent party, even though they would not form another majority government until the 1870s. The modern Conservative Party descends from the Protectionists who broke with Peel in 1846, although they did not reintroduce Protection when they were returned to power. Under the leadership of Derby and Disraeli they consolidated their position and slowly rebuilt the strength of the party. Although Derby led several minority governments in the 1850s and 1860s, the party could not achieve a majority until 1874, after the passage of the Reform Act 1867, which broadened the franchise. Disraeli's mixed message of patriotism and promises of social reforms managed to win him enough working-class support to win a majority in 1874, but the Conservative hold remained tenuous, and Disraeli was defeated in the election of 1880. It was not until the split in the Liberal Party over Irish home rule in 1886 that the Conservatives were able to achieve truly secure majorities through the defection of the Liberal Unionists. In 1891, the Irish Conservative Party, which had experienced considerable electoral loses over the previous two decades, joined with other Irish unionist movements to form the Irish Unionist Alliance (IUA). The IUA's MPs took the Conservative whip at Westminster.

Disraeli provided a widely popular hero for Conservatives, and was much celebrated in the popular culture in support of imperialism for decades after his death.

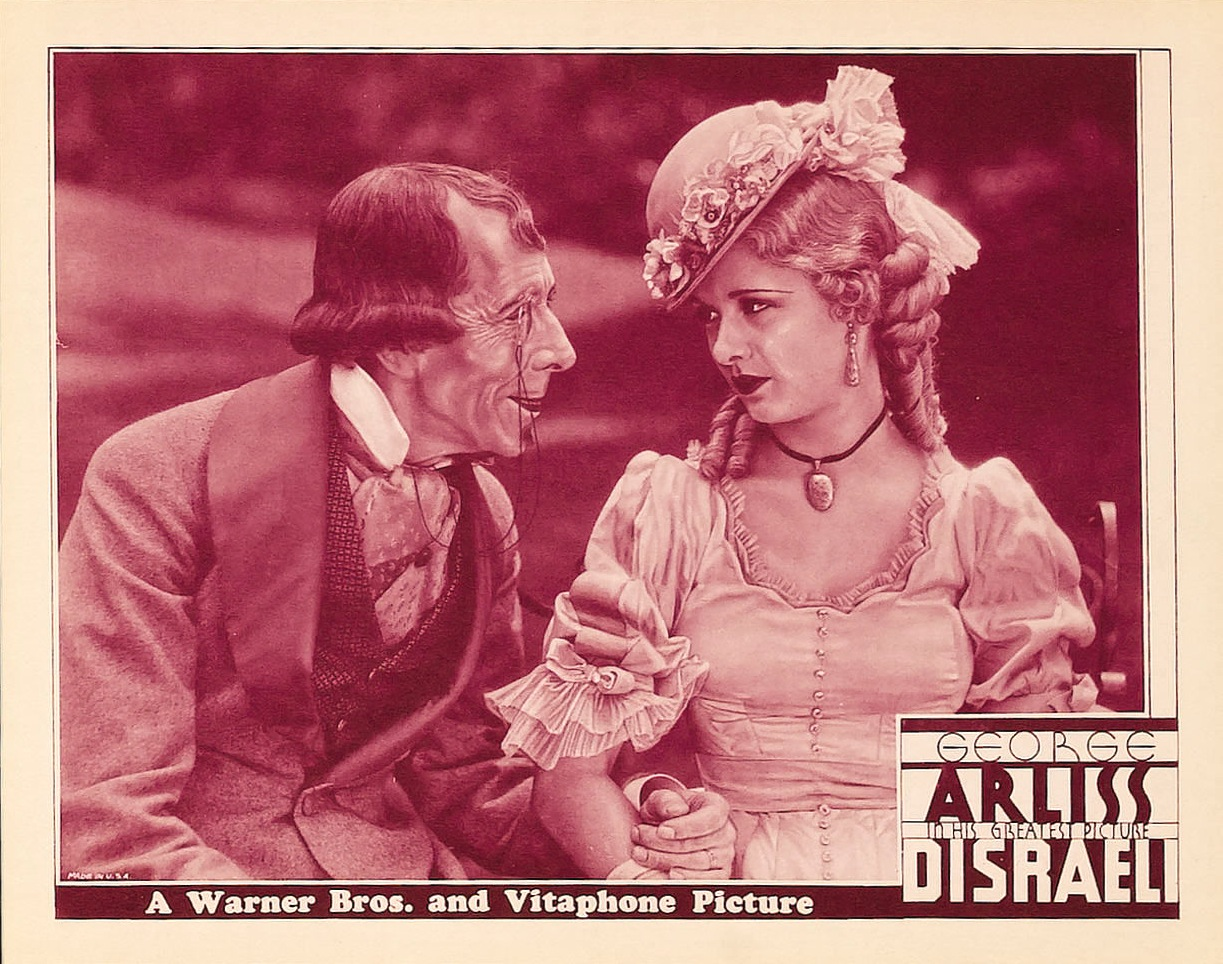
Movie star George Arliss won an Oscar in 1929 for portraying Disraeli as a paternalistic, kindly, homely statesman running a benevolent British Empire

British music hall patrons in the 1880s and 1890s applauded the xenophobia and pride in empire that were exemplified by the halls' most popular political heroes: all were Conservatives and Disraeli stood out above all, while Gladstone was used as a villain. By the 1920s historical films helped maintain the political status quo by imposing an establishment viewpoint that emphasised the greatness of monarchy, empire, and tradition. The films created "a facsimile world where existing values were invariably validated by events in the film and where all discord could be turned into harmony by an acceptance of the status quo." Disraeli was an especially popular film hero: "historical dramas favoured Disraeli over Gladstone and, more substantively, promulgated an essentially deferential view of democratic leadership." Stage and screen actor George Arliss was known for his portrayals of Disraeli, winning the Oscar as best actor for 1929's Disraeli. Steven Fielding says Arliss "personified the kind of paternalistic, kindly, homely statesmanship that appealed to a significant proportion of the cinema audience....Even workers attending Labour party meetings deferred to leaders with an elevated social background who showed they cared.".

== Unionist ascendancy ==
The Conservatives, now led by Lord Salisbury, remained in power for most of the next twenty years, at first passively supported by the Liberal Unionists and then, after 1895, in active coalition with them. From 1895, unofficially, and after 1912 officially, the Conservative-Liberal Unionist coalition was often simply called the "Unionists". In 1902 Salisbury retired, and his nephew Arthur Balfour became prime minister.

The party then split on the issue of Tariff Reform. The controversy had been taken up by the Liberal Unionist cabinet minister Joseph Chamberlain, who was Colonial Secretary. Like the earlier schism over the Corn Laws in 1846, the result led to polarisation within the coalition between those who supported Chamberlain and Imperial Preference, and those who opposed him in defence of the status quo and Free Trade. The split went across both Unionist parties. With the beleaguered Balfour in the middle, the government struggled on for another two years and saw many Unionist MPs defect to the Liberals. These defectors included the future Conservative party leader Winston Churchill in 1904.

=== Early 20th century ===
The Conservatives—usually called "Unionists"—were dominant from the 1890s to 1906. The party had many strengths, appealing to voters supportive of imperialism, tariffs, the Church of England, a powerful Royal Navy, and traditional hierarchical society. There was a powerful leadership base in the landed aristocracy and landed gentry in rural England, plus strong support from the Church of England and military interests. Historians have used election returns to demonstrate that Conservatives did surprisingly well in working-class districts. They had an appeal as well to the better-off element of traditional working class Britons in the larger cities. In rural areas, the national headquarters made highly effective use of paid travelling lecturers, with pamphlets, posters, and especially lantern slides, who were able to communicate effectively with rural voters – particularly the newly enfranchised agricultural workers. In the first years of the 20th century, the Conservative government, with Arthur Balfour as Prime Minister 1902–1905, had numerous successes in foreign policy, defence, and education, and enacted solutions for the high-profile issues of alcohol licensing and land ownership for the peasants of Ireland.

Nevertheless, the weaknesses were accumulating, and proved so overwhelming in 1906 that they did not return to complete power until 1922. The Conservative Party was losing its drive and enthusiasm, especially after the retirement of the charismatic Joseph Chamberlain. There was a bitter split on "tariff reform" (that is, imposing tariffs or taxes on all imports), that drove many of the free traders over to the Liberal camp. Tariff reform was a losing issue that the Conservative leadership inexplicably clung to. Support among the top tier of the working class, and in lower middle class weakened, and there was dissatisfaction among the intellectuals. The 1906 election was a landslide for the opposition, which saw its total vote jump 25 percent, while the Conservative total vote held steady.

The election of 1906 ended in a landslide defeat for the Unionists and their numbers were reduced to just 157 members of the House of Commons. The Unionists had been suffering as a result of the unpopular Boer War, as well as the unpopular tariff reforms proposed by Chamberlain, which faced the popularity of free trade among the urban population. Chamberlain himself was told to keep his "hands off the people's food!" Balfour lost his own seat, although he soon returned to Parliament in a by-election. The severe stroke suffered by Joseph Chamberlain in July 1906 ended his career; the cause of Tariff reform would now be promoted by his son Austen Chamberlain.

In 1909 the Conservative Party was renamed the "Conservative and Unionist Party", and in May 1912 it formally merged with the Liberal Unionists.

The Unionists strongly opposed many of the proposed reforms of the new Liberal government of Campbell-Bannerman and that of Asquith which followed. In 1910, the Unionist-dominated House of Lords rejected the so-called "People's Budget", leading to a long conflict over the nature and constitutional place of the House of Lords. The Conservatives managed to make up much of their losses in both the January and December elections of 1910. This forced the Liberals to rely on Irish Nationalist votes to maintain their majority. Although the Liberals were able to force through the effective subjugation of the Lords with the Parliament Act 1911, their advocacy once again cost them support, so that by 1914 a Unionist victory in the next election looked possible. Under Bonar Law's leadership in 1911–14, the Party's morale improved, the "radical right" wing was contained, and the party machinery strengthened. It made some progress toward developing constructive social policies.

The removal of the House of Lords veto also allowed the Government to pass the Irish Home Rule Act 1914 after which the Ulster Unionist leader Edward Carson threatened civil war. He was backed up by the newly formed Ulster Volunteers and smuggled German arms. Bonar Law was pushing hard—certainly blustering and threatening, and perhaps bluffing—but in the end his strategy proved both coherent and effective as he stopped Home Rule and enabled the formation of Northern Ireland. However the First World War meant the act was suspended; it never took effect and by 1921 Ireland was partitioned, with Northern Ireland remaining part of the United Kingdom; it became a conservative stronghold.

=== First World War ===
The Conservatives served with the Liberals in an all-party coalition government during the First World War, and the coalition continued under Liberal PM David Lloyd George (with half of the Liberals) until 1922. Nigel Keohane finds that the Conservatives were bitterly divided before 1914, especially on the issue of Irish Unionism and the experience of three consecutive election losses. However the war pulled the party together, allowing it to emphasise patriotism as it found new leadership and worked out its positions on the Irish question, socialism, woman suffrage, electoral reform, and the issue of intervention in the economy. They became the dominant partner in Lloyd George's coalition government following their landslide in the 1918 "coupon" election. Patriotism appealed to its base in rural England. The fresh emphasis on anti-Socialism was its response to the growing strength of the Labour Party as the Liberals faded. The Coalition enfranchised some women with the Representation of the People Act 1918, the Conservatives enfranchised them all with the Representation of the People (Equal Franchise) Act 1928 and aggressively sought their votes, often relying on patriotic themes.

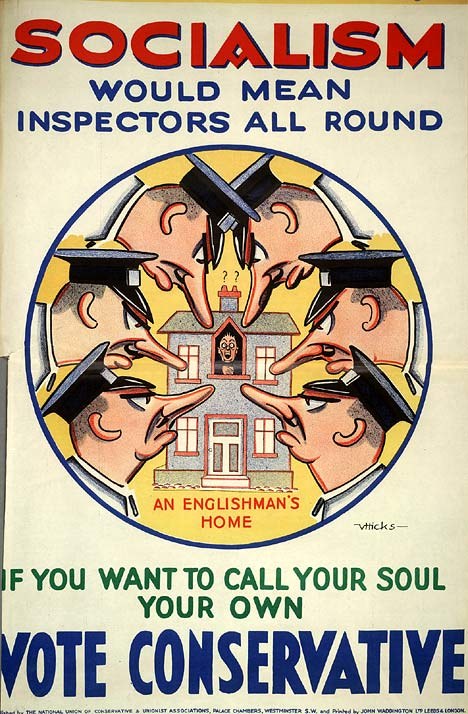
1929 poster criticising the Labour Party

== Baldwin era ==
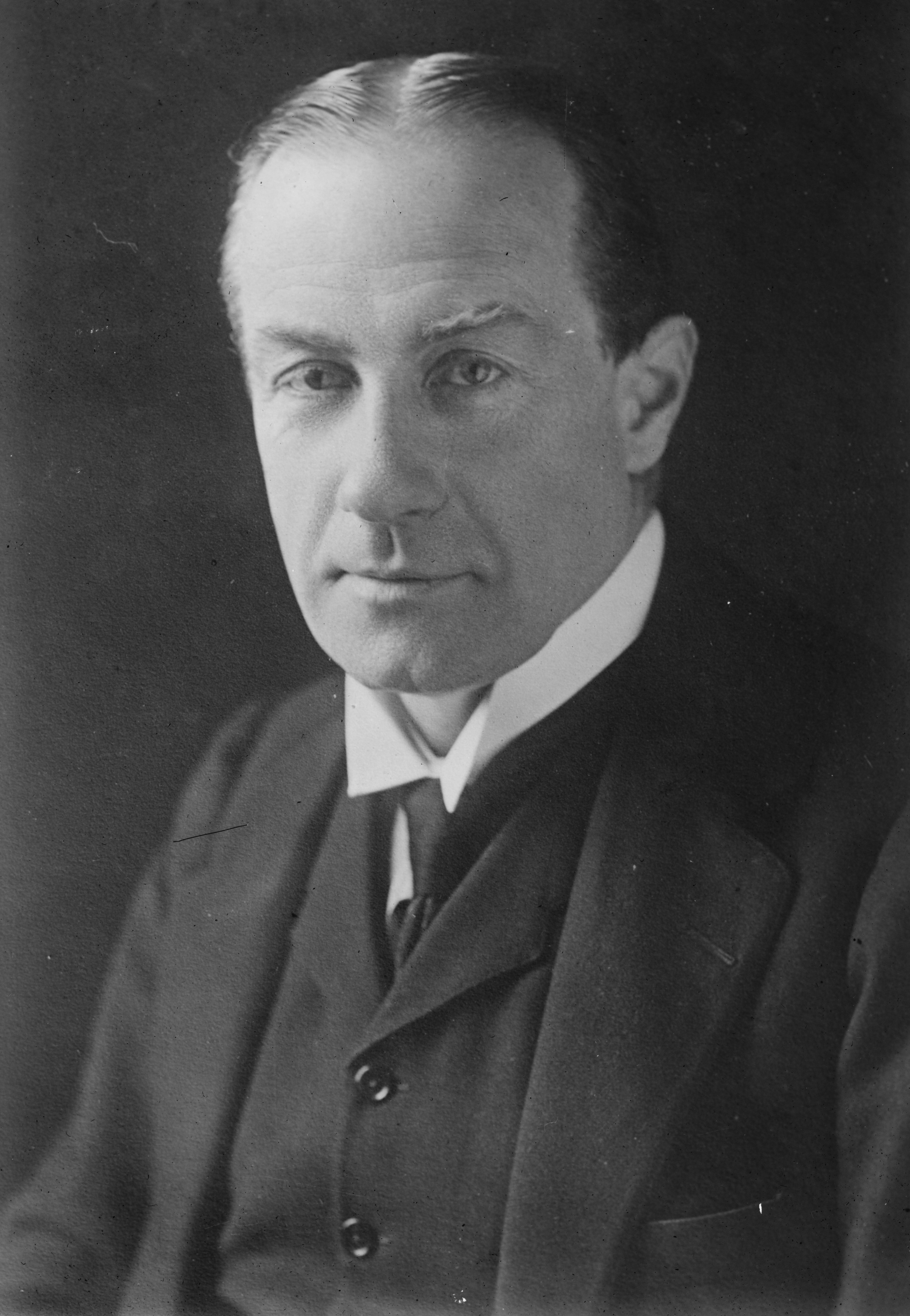
Conservative Prime Minister (1923–1924, 1924–1929 and 1935–1937) Stanley Baldwin.

For the next few years it seemed possible that the Liberals who supported Lloyd George and the Conservatives would merge into a new political grouping. However the reluctance of these Liberals to lose their identity ended this ambition and the moment was lost. From then on the rumblings of discontent within the coalition over issues such as the Soviet Union, trade unions and the Irish War of Independence (leading to the de facto independence for the Irish Free State in 1921) led to many Conservatives hoping to break with Lloyd George. Bonar Law resigned in 1921 on the grounds of ill health and the parliamentary party was now led by Austen Chamberlain. Previously a contender for party leadership in 1911, Chamberlain was to prove ineffective in controlling his party—even passing up the offer of becoming prime minister when Lloyd George indicated he was willing to step down. The party eventually broke with Lloyd George in October 1922 as the result of the Carlton Club meeting. They voted against remaining in the coalition and Chamberlain resigned. He was replaced by Bonar Law, who had been persuaded by friends and allies to return to lead the party. The Irish Unionist Alliance collapsed in 1922, and the conservative movement in Northern Ireland was taken up by its successor there, the Ulster Unionist Party (UUP). The UUP MPs would take the Conservative whip at Westminster until 1972.

After winning the election of 1922, Bonar Law, terminally ill, resigned in May 1923. Though holding a majority in government, the Tories were still split, as many of those who stayed to the bitter end of the former coalition had refused to take office in Law's cabinet. Their absence explains why the hitherto unknown Stanley Baldwin was to become leader of the party barely two years after first entering a major ministerial post. Baldwin called an election in 1923 on the issue of tariffs but lost his majority; Ramsay MacDonald formed a minority Labour government. Baldwin was back after winning the 1924 election. His second government brought in Austen Chamberlain as foreign secretary, Winston Churchill at the Exchequer, and Neville Chamberlain at the health ministry. Baldwin adroitly handled the General Strike in 1926 and passed the 1927 Trades Disputes Act to curb the powers of trade unions. Baldwin lost the 1929 General Election and his continued leadership was subject to sharp criticism by the press barons Rothermere and Beaverbrook.

The party reached a new height in the inter-war years under Baldwin's leadership. His mixture of strong social reforms and steady government proved a powerful election combination, with the result that the Conservatives governed Britain either by themselves or as the leading component of the National Government for most of the interwar years and all through the Second World War. The Conservatives under Baldwin were also the last political party in Britain to gain over half of the vote, which they did in the general election of 1931. Yet as the war ended in victory the public demanded fresh leadership. The Conservatives were soundly defeated in the 1945 General Election by a resurgent Labour Party.

== Post war recovery ==
The party responded to its defeat of 1945 by accepting many of the Attlee government's welfare state reforms, while offering a distinctive Conservative edge, as set out in their policy statement Industrial Charter (1947). Until the 1970s the two parties largely agreed on foreign policy, with both supporting NATO (1949–present) and the Anglo-American alliance of the Cold War (1947–1989). Economic recovery was slow, however, and that provided the opening for a comeback.

=== Popular dissatisfaction ===
In the late 1940s, the Conservative Party incited growing public anger against food rationing, scarcity, controls, austerity, and omnipresent government bureaucracy. It used the dissatisfaction with the socialistic and egalitarian policies of the Labour Party to rally middle-class supporters and to build a political comeback that won the 1951 general election. Their appeal was especially effective to housewives, who faced even more difficult shopping conditions after the war than during it.

=== Modernising the party ===
The success of the Conservative Party in reorganising itself was validated by its victory in the 1951 election. It had restored its credibility on economic policy with the Industrial Charter written by Rab Butler, which emphasised the importance of removing unnecessary controls, while going far beyond the laissez-faire attitude of old toward industrial social problems. Churchill was party leader, but he brought in a Party Chairman to modernise the creaking institution. Lord Woolton was a successful department store owner and wartime Minister of Food. As Party Chairman 1946–55, he rebuilt the local organisations with an emphasis on membership, money, and a unified national propaganda appeal on critical issues. To broaden the base of potential candidates, the national party provided financial aid to candidates, and assisted the local organisations in raising local money. Lord Woolton emphasised a rhetoric that characterised the opponents as "Socialist" rather than "Labour." The libertarian influence of Professor Friedrich Hayek's 1944 best-seller The Road to Serfdom was apparent in the younger generation, but that took another quarter century to have a policy impact. By 1951, Labour had worn out its welcome in the middle classes; its factions were bitterly embroiled. Conservatives were ready to govern again.

With a narrow win in the 1951 general election, Churchill was back. Although he was aging rapidly, he had national and global prestige. Apart from rationing, which was ended, most of the welfare state enacted by Labour were accepted by the Conservatives and became part of the "Post-war consensus", which lasted until the 1970s. The Conservatives were conciliatory toward unions, but they did de-nationalise the steel and road haulage industries in 1953.

In 1955 Churchill retired and was succeeded by Anthony Eden. Eden had an immense personal popularity and lengthy experience as foreign secretary, and saw the Conservatives win the general election with an increased majority later that year, but his government then ran into a number of troubles on the domestic front as the economy began to overheat.

In international affairs the spectacular fiasco of the Suez Crisis of 1956 ended Eden's career, but it had little negative impact on the party. The succession was contentious, with Rab Butler as the favourite to succeed. However, it was Harold Macmillan who became the next prime minister and leader of the party. Macmillan sought to rebuild the government's image both at home and abroad, and presided over strong economic growth and a massive expansion in the consumer-product economy. In 1959 he won the general election of that year on this economic success, summed up in the slogan "You've never had it so good". The Conservatives had now won three general elections in succession and once again they had increased their majority. Such was the scale of their success that there was widespread public and media doubt as to whether the Labour Party was capable of winning a general election ever again.

However, rising unemployment and an economic downturn in the early 1960s eroded support for Macmillan's government. It was further rocked in 1963 by the resignation of the secretary of state for war John Profumo over the Profumo affair. In October of that year, Macmillan was misdiagnosed with terminal cancer and resigned.

The party at this time lacked a formal process for electing a new leader and Macmillan's resignation took place in the week of the annual Conservative Party Conference. This event rapidly became an American-style convention as leading ministers sought to establish their credentials. Eventually Macmillan formally recommended to the Queen that she appoint the Earl of Home as prime minister. Home was appointed and renounced his peerage, becoming Sir Alec Douglas-Home, but was unable to restore the party's fortunes and narrowly lost the 1964 general election to Harold Wilson's Labour, who ended 13 years of Conservative rule.

== Heath years: 1965–1975 ==
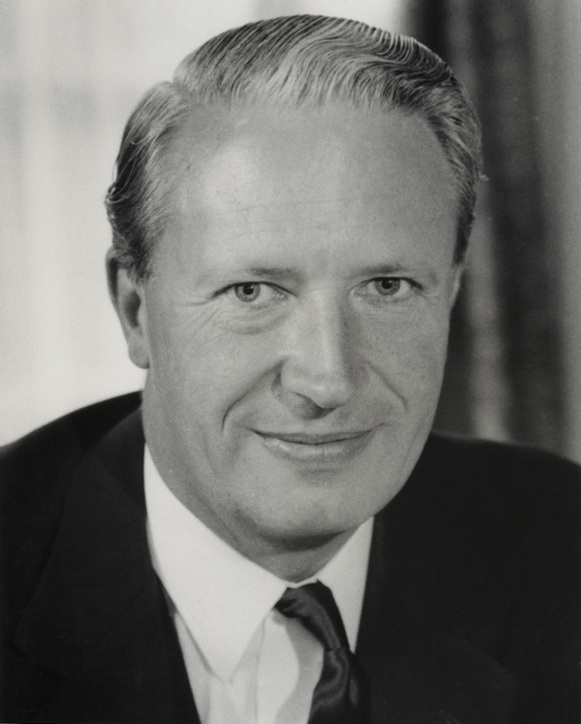
Conservative Prime Minister (1970–1974) Edward Heath

Following the 1964 defeat, the party formally installed a system for electing the leader. Douglas-Home stepped down in 1965 and the election to succeed him was won by Edward Heath over both Reginald Maudling and Enoch Powell. The party proceeded to lose the 1966 general election. Heath's leadership proved controversial, with frequent calls from many prominent party members and supporters for him to step down, but he persevered. To the shock of almost everyone bar Heath, the party won the 1970 general election.

As with all British governments in this period, Heath's time in office was difficult and his premiership remains one of the most controversial in the party's history. At first, his government tried to follow monetarist policies of the kind later termed "Thatcherism". This failed because high inflation and unemployment blocked Heath's attempts to reform the increasingly militant trade unions. The era of 1970s British industrial unrest had arrived.

The Troubles in Northern Ireland would lead Heath to suspending the Parliament of Northern Ireland and introducing direct rule as a precursor to establishing a power sharing executive under the Sunningdale Agreement. This resulted in the Conservative Party losing the support of the Ulster Unionist Party at Westminster, which was to have consequences in later years when the party found itself reliant on tiny Commons majorities. Heath himself considered his greatest success in office to be the United Kingdom's entry into the European Economic Community (or the "Common Market" as it was widely called at the time) but in subsequent years the UK's membership of the EEC was to prove the source of the greatest division in the party.

The country suffered a further bout of inflation in 1973 as a result of the OPEC cartel raising oil prices, and this in turn led to renewed demands for wage increases in the coal industry. The government refused to accede to the miner's demands, resulting in a series of stoppages and massive attempts to ration power, including the "Three-Day Week". Heath decided to call a snap election on the question of "Who Governs Britain?". However the Conservative Party was unprepared, whilst the miners' unions stated that they did not see how the re-election of the government would change the situation. The Conservatives were further rocked by the death of Iain Macleod and the resignation of Enoch Powell, who denounced the government for taking the country into the EEC and called on voters to back the Labour Party, who had promised a referendum on withdrawal. The February 1974 election produced an unusual result as support for the Liberals, Scottish National Party and Plaid Cymru all surged, Northern Ireland's politics became more localised, whilst the Conservatives won a plurality of votes but Labour had a plurality of seats. With a hung Parliament elected and the Ulster Unionists refusing to support the Conservative party, Heath tried to negotiate with the Liberals to form a coalition, but the attempts foundered on demands that were not acceptable to both parties. Heath was forced to resign as prime minister.

These years were seen as the height of "consensus politics". However, by the 1970s many traditional methods of running the economy, managing relations with trade unions, and so on began to fail—or had outright already failed. This was also a period of Labour-Party ascendancy, as they ruled for nearly twelve out of the fifteen years between 1964 and 1979. Many in the Conservative Party were left wondering how to proceed.

== Thatcher years: 1975–1990 ==
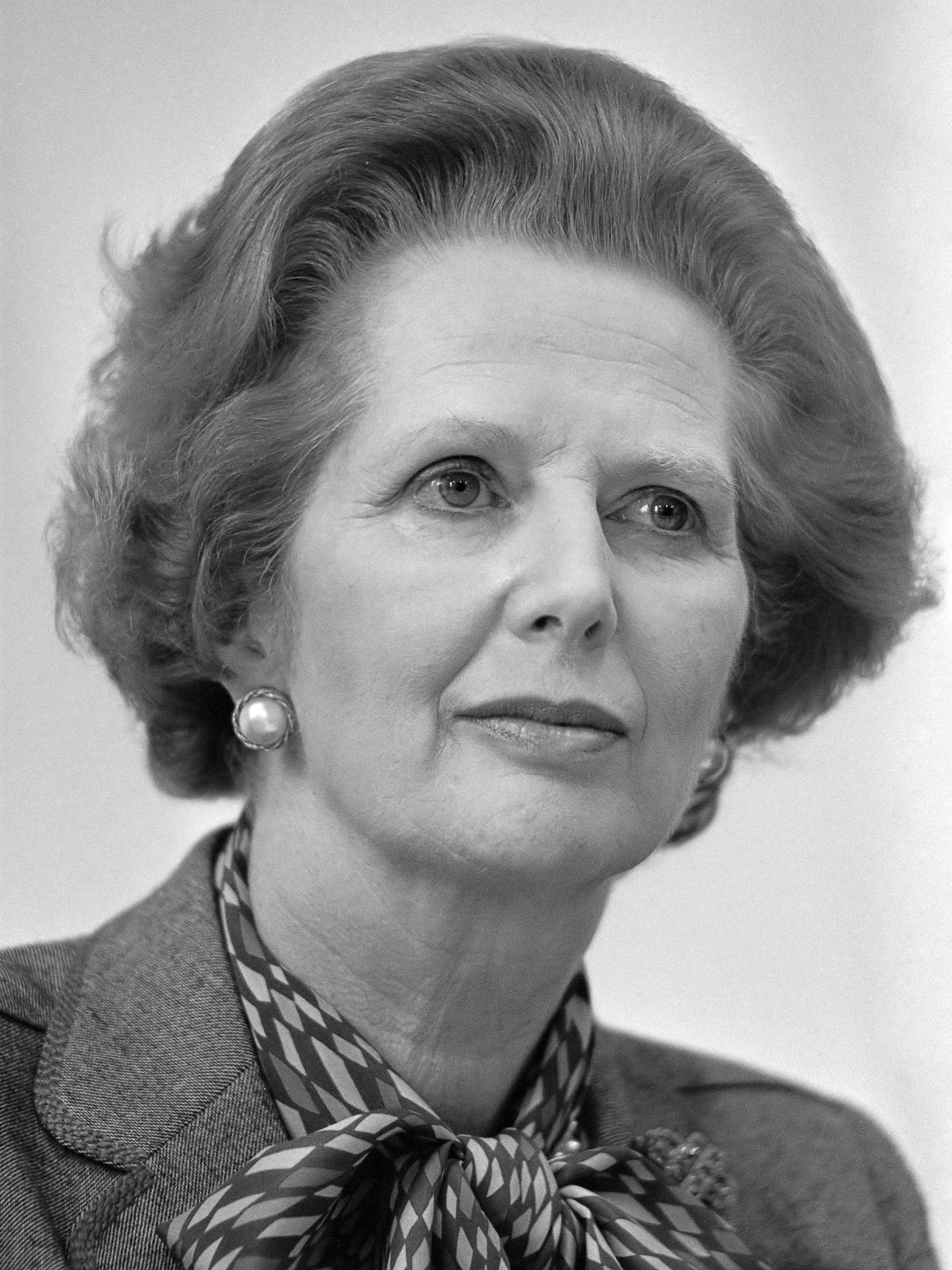
Conservative Prime Minister (1979–1990) Margaret Thatcher

Heath remained leader of the party despite growing challenges to his mandate, and the fact that he had now lost three of his four general elections as party leader. At the time there was no system for challenging an incumbent leader but after renewed pressure and a second general election defeat a system was put in place and Heath agreed to holding a leadership election to allow him to renew his mandate. In spite of his track record as Conservative party leader, which had included defeat at three out of four general elections, few both inside and out of the party expected him to be seriously challenged, let alone defeated. However, Margaret Thatcher stood against Heath and in a shock result outpolled him on the first ballot, leading him to withdraw from the contest. Thatcher then faced off four other candidates to become the first woman to lead a major British political party. Thatcher had much support from the monetarists, led by Keith Joseph. The Conservatives would eventually capitalise on the Winter of Discontent during late 1978 and early 1979, and even in the very early Thatcher era they were able to criticise the Labour government for rising inflation and unemployment, not to mention the humiliating bailout of the UK economy by the IMF in 1976. However, when the Labour government lost its parliamentary majority in March 1977, it survived a vote of confidence in parliament when challenged by the Conservatives, and then formed an electoral pact with the Liberal Party in order to prevent another similar threat to its power.

James Callaghan had succeeded Harold Wilson as Labour leader and prime minister in March 1976, and in September 1978 resisted calls to hold a general election, despite improving economic conditions and opinion polls which showed Labour well placed to win a parliamentary majority. However, this proved to be a disastrous miscalculation by Callaghan, which the Tories took advantage of, as the Winter of Discontent followed and the Tories were ascendant in the opinion polls. A vote of no confidence was delivered against Callaghan's government in March 1979, and the Tories won the 1979 general election with a majority of 44 seats, with Thatcher becoming Britain's first female prime minister.

Thatcher soon introduced controversial and difficult economic reforms in response to the crises which had blighted Britain for most of the 1970s. The Falklands War, the perceived hard left nature of the Labour Party, and the intervention of the centrist SDP–Liberal Alliance all contributed to her party winning the 1983 general election in a landslide, gaining a majority of 144. This was despite dismal opinion poll showings for the Conservative government until the Falklands conflict, and also in spite of the early 1980s recession and mass unemployment. Thatcher's monetarist policies had a positive effect in the battle against inflation, which dropped from 27% in 1979 to less than 10% by 1982 and down to 4% by 1983.

Thatcher won a third successive election in 1987, this time with a 102-seat majority. Unemployment had now fallen below 3 million for the first time since 1981, and the economy was continuing to improve.

The second and third terms were dominated by privatisations of Britain's many state-owned industries, including British Telecom in 1984, the bus companies in 1985, British Gas in 1986, British Airways in 1987, Austin Rover (formerly British Leyland), and British Steel Corporation in 1988. In 1984, Thatcher also successfully concluded five-year-long negotiations over Britain's budget to the European Economic Community. (See UK rebate.)

In 1989, the Community Charge (frequently referred to as the "Poll tax") was introduced to replace the ancient system of rates (based on property values) which funded local government. This unpopular new charge was a flat rate per adult no matter what their circumstances; it seemed to be shifting the tax burden disproportionately onto the poor. Once again Thatcher's popularity sagged, but this time the Conservatives thought it might cost them the election. Michael Heseltine, a former cabinet member, challenged her for the leadership in November 1990. She won the first round, but not enough to win outright, and having initially announced her intention to "fight on and fight to win" she resigned after it was clear the cabinet wouldn't back her she announced her intention to stand down. This signalled the end of her time in office on 22 November 1990 after 11 years as prime minister—a longer spell in power than any prime minister of the 20th century. In the ensuing second ballot, the chancellor of the exchequer John Major beat Heseltine and Douglas Hurd. Thatcher continued to sit in parliament as an MP until the 1992 general election, when she stepped down from parliament after 33 years.

== Major years: 1990–1997 ==
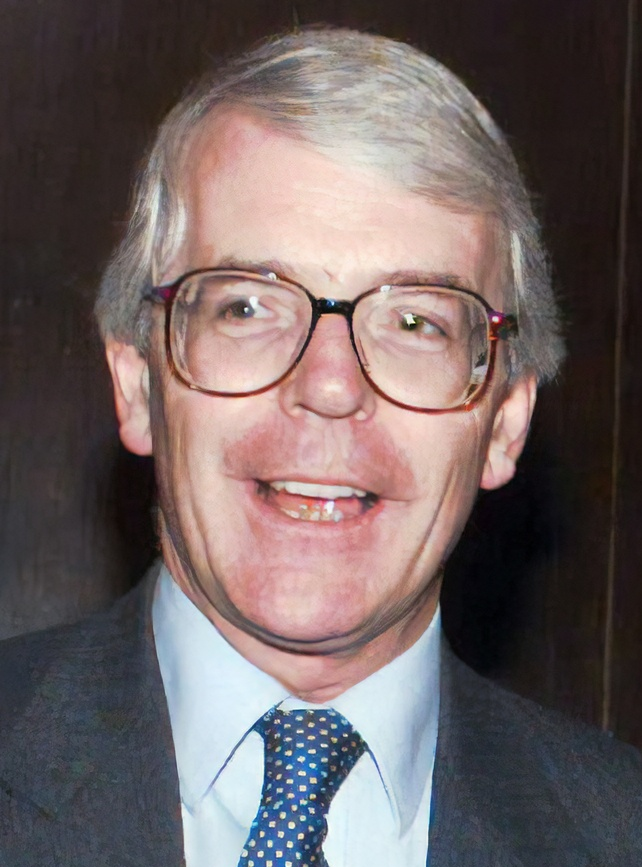
Conservative Prime Minister (1990–1997) John Major

Major introduced a replacement for the Community Charge, the Council Tax, and continued with the privatisations, and went on to narrowly win the 1992 election with a majority of 21.

Major's government was beset by scandals, crisis, and missteps. Many of the scandals were about the personal lives of politicians which the media construed as hypocrisy, but the cash-for-questions affair and the divisions over EU were substantive. In 1995, Major resigned as Leader of the Conservative Party in order to trigger a leadership election which he hoped would give him a renewed mandate, and quieten the Maastricht rebels (e.g. Iain Duncan Smith, Bill Cash, Bernard Jenkin). John Redwood, then Secretary of State for Wales, stood against Major and gained around a fifth of the leadership vote. He was one of the people whom Major inadvertently referred to as 'bastards' during a television interview. Major was pleased that Michael Heseltine had not stood against him and gave him the position of Deputy Prime Minister as a result.

As the term went on, with by-elections being consistently lost by the Conservatives, their majority declined and eventually vanished entirely. Getting every vote out became increasingly important to both sides, and on several occasions ill MPs were wheeled into the Commons to vote. Eventually, the Government became a technical minority.

As predicted, the general election of May 1997 was a win for the Labour Party, but the magnitude of the victory surprised almost everyone. There was a swing of 20% in some places, and Labour achieved a majority of 179 with 43% of the vote to the Conservatives' 31%. Tactical voting against the Conservatives is believed to have caused around 40 seats to change hands. They lost all their seats outside England, with prominent members such as Michael Portillo and Malcolm Rifkind among the losses. Major resigned within 24 hours.

It is often said that the Conservatives lost the 1997 election due to EU party-policy divisions. However, it is likely that the European question played only a small or insignificant part in the result. Accusations of "Tory sleaze", apathy towards a government that had been in power for nearly two decades, and a rebranded "New" Labour Party with a dynamic and charismatic leader (Tony Blair) are all probable factors in the Conservative defeat.

=== Tory "sleaze" ===
A number of political scandals in the 1990s (building on previous examples in the 1980s) created the impression of what is described in the British press as "sleaze": a perception, peaking towards the end of the Major era, that the Conservatives were associated with political corruption and hypocrisy. In particular the successful entrapment of Graham Riddick and David Tredinnick in the "cash for questions" scandal, the contemporaneous misconduct as a minister by Neil Hamilton (who lost a consequent libel action against The Guardian), and the convictions of former Cabinet member Jonathan Aitken and former party deputy chairman Jeffrey Archer for perjury in two separate cases leading to custodial sentences damaged the Conservatives' public reputation. Persistent unsubstantiated rumours about the activities of the party treasurer Michael Ashcroft did not help this impression.

At the same time a series of revelations about the private lives of various Conservative politicians also grabbed the headlines and both the media and the party's opponents made little attempt to clarify the distinction between financial conduct and private lives.

John Major's "Back to Basics" morality campaign back-fired on him by providing an excuse for the British media to expose "sleaze" within the Conservative Party and, most damagingly, within the Cabinet itself. A number of ministers were then revealed to have committed sexual indiscretions, and Major was forced by media pressure to dismiss them. In September 2002 it was revealed that, prior to his promotion to the cabinet, Major had himself had a longstanding extramarital affair with a fellow MP, Edwina Currie.

== In opposition: 1997–2010 ==
=== William Hague: 1997–2001 ===
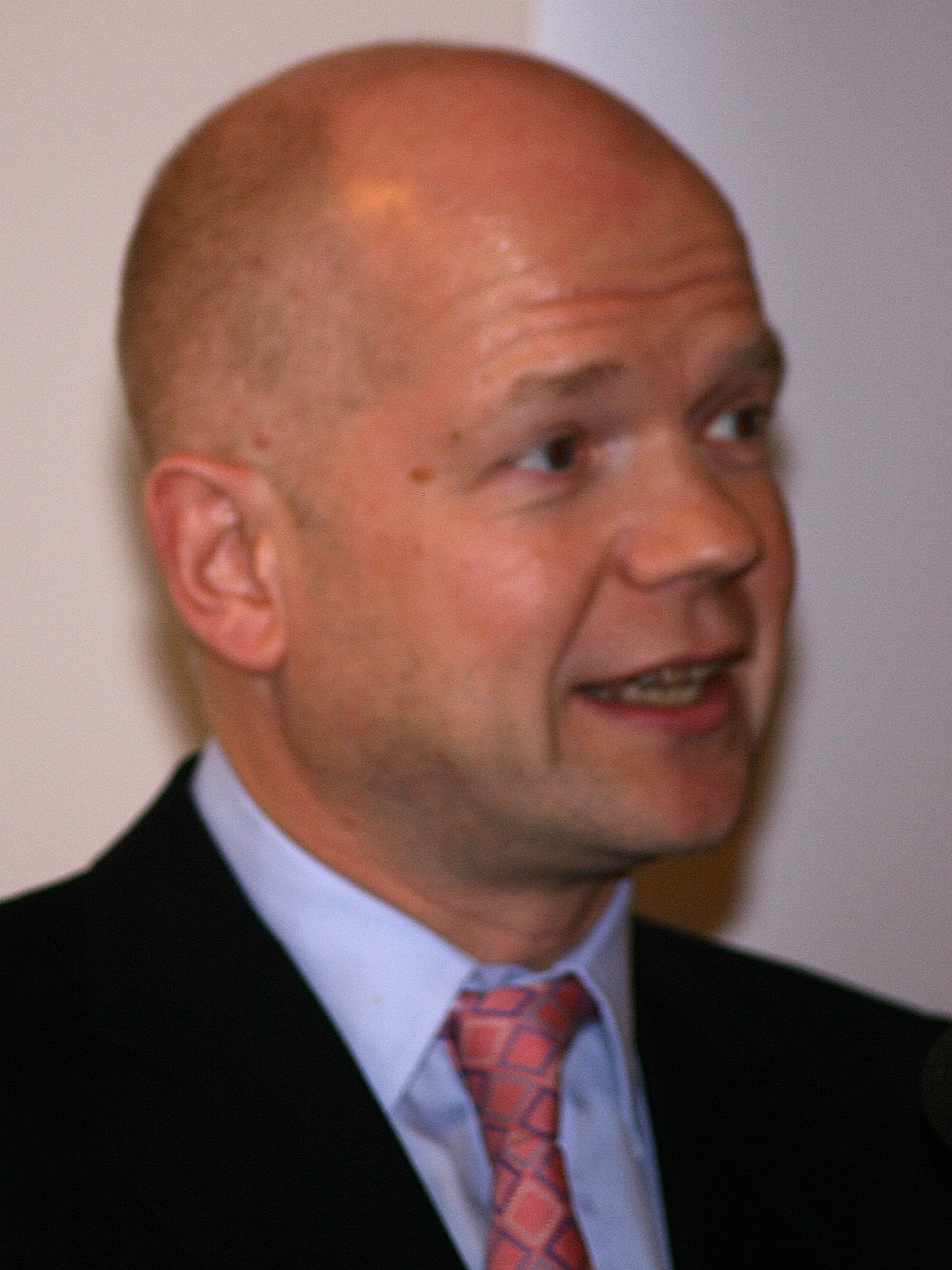
Conservative Leader (1997–2001) William Hague

The ensuing leadership election was contested by five candidates. The electorate for the contest consisted solely of the 165 Conservative MPs who had been returned to the House of Commons. The candidates were Kenneth Clarke, William Hague, John Redwood, Peter Lilley and Michael Howard, with Stephen Dorrell launching an initial bid but withdrawing before polling began, citing limited support, and backing Clarke. Clarke was the favoured candidate of the Europhile left of the party, while the three latter candidates divided right-wing support roughly equally. Hague, who had initially supported Howard, emerged second as a compromise candidate and won the final ballot after Redwood and Clarke negotiated a joint ticket which was derided as an Instability Pact by their opponents (punning on the economic Stability Pact of the European Community).

At first William Hague portrayed himself as a moderniser with a common touch. However, by the time the 2001 general election came he concentrated on Europe, asylum seekers and tax cuts whilst declaring that only the Conservative Party could "Save the Pound". Though a master debater who would regularly trounce Tony Blair in the Commons, his leadership tenure was beset by poor publicity and stumbles. Despite a low turnout, the election resulted in a net gain of a single seat for the Conservative Party and William Hague's resignation as party leader.

=== Iain Duncan Smith: 2001–2003 ===
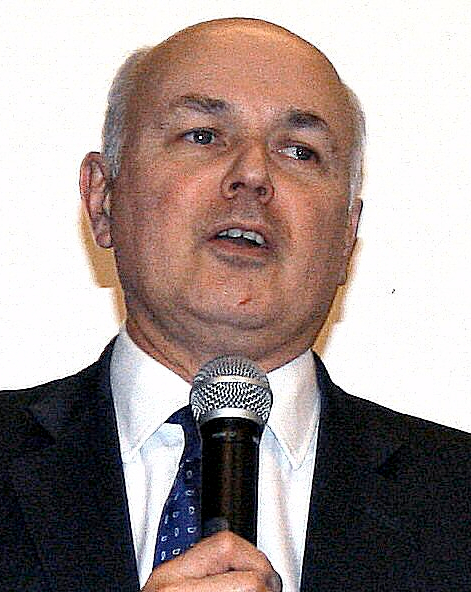
Conservative Leader (2001–2003) Iain Duncan Smith

The 2001 leadership election was conducted under a new leadership electoral system designed by Hague. This resulted in five candidates competing for the job: Michael Portillo, Iain Duncan Smith, Kenneth Clarke, David Davis and Michael Ancram. The drawn-out and at times acrimonious election saw Conservative MPs select Iain Duncan Smith and Ken Clarke to be put forward for a vote by party members. As Conservative Party members are characteristically Eurosceptic, Iain Duncan Smith was elected, even though opinion polls showed that the public preferred Ken Clarke, a member of the Tory Reform Group.

Iain Duncan Smith (often known as IDS) was a strong Eurosceptic but this did not define his leadership – indeed it was during his tenure that Europe ceased to be an issue of division in the party as it united behind calls for a referendum on the proposed European Union Constitution. Duncan Smith's shadow cabinet contained many new and unfamiliar faces but despite predictions by some that the party would lurch to the right the team instead followed a pragmatic moderate approach to policy.

On 27 October Iain Duncan Smith began to face calls within his own party to either resign as leader or face a vote of confidence. Under the rules of the Conservative party, the backbench Conservative 1922 Committee would review the leadership, and in order for this to take place the chairman of the committee, Sir Michael Spicer must be presented with 25 letters proposing a vote.

On 28 October sufficient letters were presented to the chairman of the 1922 Committee to initiate a vote of confidence in Iain Duncan Smith. The vote came on 29 October, and IDS lost 90 to 75.

=== Michael Howard: 2003–2005 ===
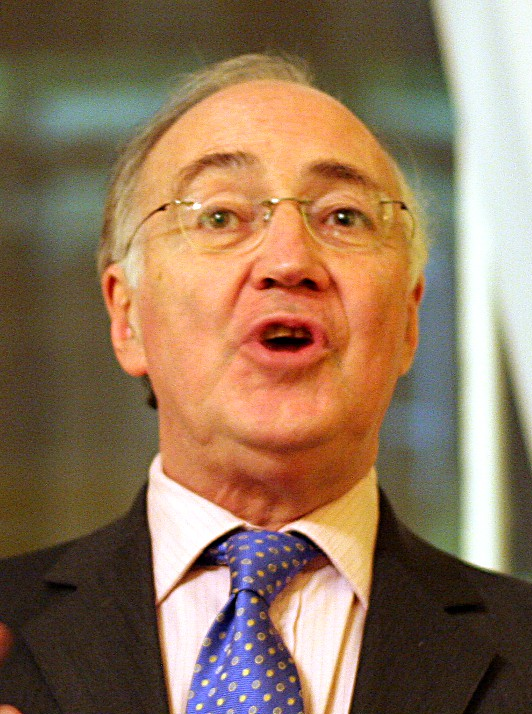
Conservative Leader (2003–2005) Michael Howard

Duncan Smith remained as caretaker leader until Michael Howard, MP for Folkestone and Hythe, was elected to the post of leader (as the only candidate) on 6 November 2003.

Howard announced radical changes to the way the Shadow Cabinet would work. He slashed the number of members by half, with Theresa May and Tim Yeo each shadowing two government departments. Minor departments still have shadows but have been removed from the cabinet, and the post of Shadow Leader of the House of Commons was abolished. The role of party chairman was also split into two, with Lord Saatchi responsible for the party machine, and Liam Fox handling publicity. Michael Portillo was offered a position but refused, due to his plans to step down from Parliament at the next election.

Also, a panel of "grandees", including John Major, Iain Duncan Smith, William Hague and, notably, Kenneth Clarke has been set up to advise the leadership as they see fit.

On 2 January 2004, influenced by Saatchi, Howard defined a personal credo and list of core beliefs of the party. At the party conference of October 2004, the Conservatives presented their "Timetable For Action" that a Conservative government would follow. In the 2005 general election, the Conservative Party made a partial recovery by a net gain of 31 seats, with the Labour majority falling to 66.

The day after, on 6 May, Howard announced that he believed himself too old to lead the party into another election campaign, and he would therefore be stepping down to allow a new leader the time to prepare for the next election. Howard said that he believed that the party needed to amend the rules governing the election of the Party leader, and that he would allow time for that to happen before resigning. See 2005 Conservative Party leadership election

The 2005 campaign received criticism from its main financial backer, Michael Spencer. In an interview with The Times Tim Collins claimed that the specific reasons the party won more seats may not repeat themselves in the next general election:

- The unpopularity of Tony Blair. This helped the Liberal Democrats and hence the Conservative Party in close fights. Blair will not be standing at the next election.
- The left-of-Labour policies of the Liberal Democrats helped Conservatives in Conservative/Lib Dem marginal seats.
- Labour's campaign in their marginal seats was poor.

=== David Cameron: 2005–2010 ===
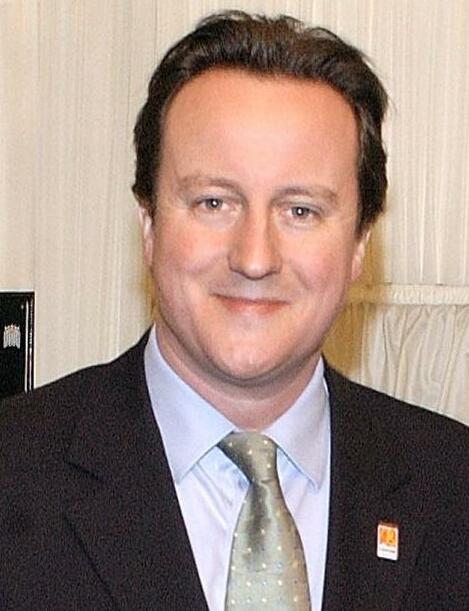
Conservative Leader (2005–2016) David Cameron

David Cameron won the subsequent leadership campaign on 6 December 2005. Cameron beat his closest rival David Davis by a margin of more than two to one, taking 134,446 votes to 64,398, and announced his intention to reform and realign the Conservative Party in a manner similar to that achieved by the Labour Party in opposition under Tony Blair. As part of this he distanced from himself from the much hated Conservative Party of the past, for example apologising for Section 28, and focused in on modern environmental issues.

In April 2006 the party set out to deliver a promise by Cameron to modernise its parliamentary representation. A central candidates' committee reduced some five hundred aspiring politicians on the party's list of approved parliamentary candidates to an "A-list" of between 100 and 150 priority candidates. More than half of the names on the resulting list proved to be female, and several were of non-Establishment figures of various kinds.

The party had led in opinion polls for most of Cameron's time in office, making gains in the 2008 and 2009 local elections.

== Return to government: 2010–2024 ==
=== David Cameron: 2010–2016 ===
Conservative Prime Minister (2010–2016) David Cameron

Following the 2010 general election, David Cameron became prime minister at the head of a coalition government between the Conservatives and the Liberal Democrats, as no party had gained an overall majority in the House of Commons for the first time since the February 1974 general election. He appointed Nick Clegg, the leader of the Liberal Democrats, as deputy prime minister. Between them, the Conservatives and Liberal Democrats controlled 363 seats in the House of Commons, with a majority of 76 seats. Following the 2015 general election, Cameron was re-elected as prime minister, but this time at the head of a Conservative majority government with a parliamentary majority of 12 seats.

Cameron's premiership was marked by the effects of the 2008 financial crisis and the Great Recession; these involved a large deficit in government finances that his government sought to reduce through austerity measures. His administration passed the Health and Social Care Act and the Welfare Reform Act, which introduced large-scale changes to healthcare and welfare. It also enforced stricter immigration policies, introduced reforms to education and oversaw the 2012 London Olympics. It privatised the Royal Mail and some other state assets, and legalised same-sex marriage in England and Wales.

When the Conservatives secured an unexpected majority in the 2015 general election, he remained as prime minister, this time leading a Conservative-only government. To fulfil a manifesto pledge, Cameron introduced a referendum on the UK's continuing membership of the European Union in 2016. He supported the Britain Stronger in Europe campaign. Following the success of the Leave vote, Cameron resigned as prime minister and was succeeded in the 2016 Conservative Party leadership election by Theresa May.

=== Theresa May: 2016–2019 ===
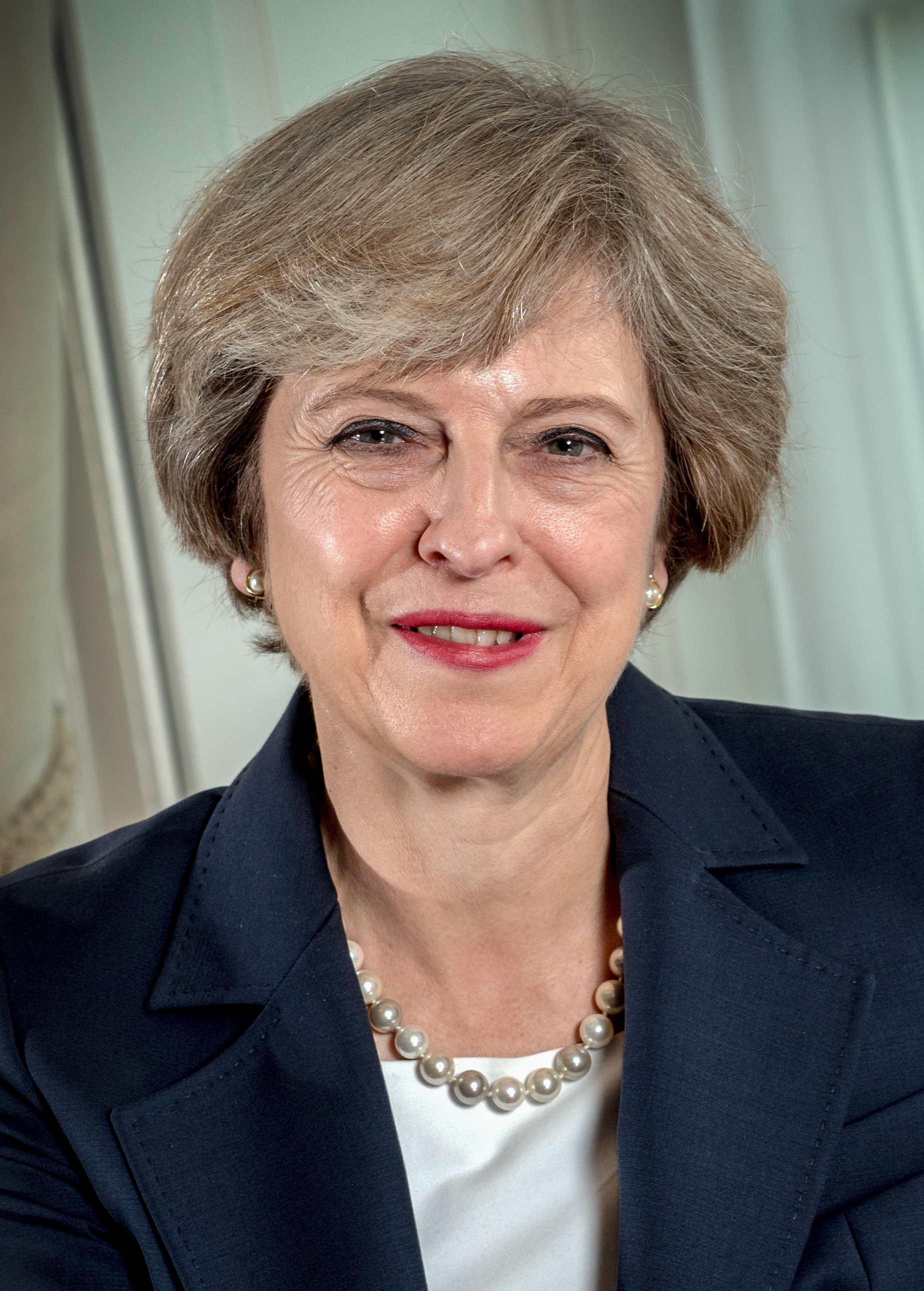
Conservative Prime Minister (2016–2019) Theresa May

Theresa May was declared Leader of the Conservative Party after her opponent, Andrea Leadsom, withdrew from the final round of the 2016 leadership election; May became Conservative leader on 11 July 2016, and she became prime minister two days later. She began the process of withdrawing the UK from the European Union, triggering Article 50 in March 2017. The following month, she announced a snap general election, with the aims of strengthening her hand in Brexit negotiations and highlighting her "strong and stable" leadership. This resulted in a hung parliament in which the number of Conservative seats had fallen from 330 to 317, despite the party winning its highest vote share since 1983. The loss of an overall majority prompted her to enter a confidence and supply arrangement with the Democratic Unionist Party (DUP) of Northern Ireland to support a minority government.

May carried out the Brexit negotiations with the European Union, adhering to the Chequers plan, which resulted in her draft Brexit withdrawal agreement. She also announced a £20 billion increase in funding to the National Health Service through the NHS Long Term Plan, established the first-ever Race Disparity Audit and launched a 25 Year Environment Plan, amending the Climate Change Act 2008 to end the UK's contribution to global warming by 2050. Unemployment in the United Kingdom fell to record lows, the lowest jobless rate since 1975. Her government also passed legislation cracking down on knife crime and giving extra powers to law enforcement and intelligence services to combat terrorism, published the 2017 Industrial Strategy White Paper and signed an immigration treaty with France to stem illegal border crossings in January 2018. Although May did not succeed in getting much of her Brexit legislation through Parliament, her government was nevertheless responsible for passing the Great Repeal Act and for negotiating and approving the near-entirety of the UK's terms of exit from the EU. Three budgets were passed during her tenure: the first in March 2017, the second in November 2017 and the third and final in October 2018. May was also a prominent figure in leading the international condemnation and response to Russia over the Salisbury poisonings of Sergei and Yulia Skripal in March 2018.

May survived two votes of no confidence in December 2018 and January 2019, but after versions of her draft withdrawal agreement were rejected by Parliament three times, May announced her resignation in May 2019. She left office on 24 July and was succeeded by Boris Johnson, her former Foreign Secretary.

=== Boris Johnson: 2019–2022 ===
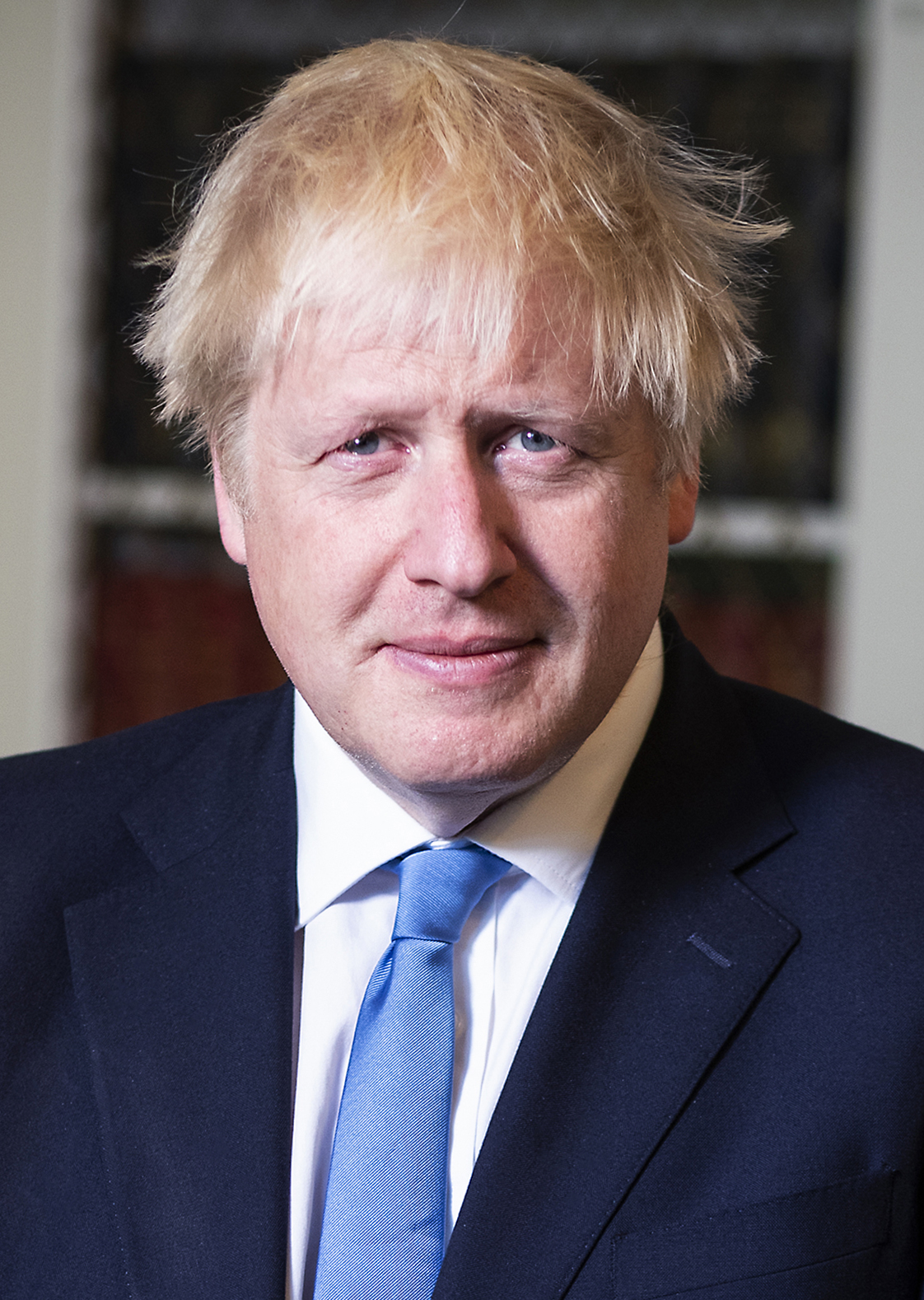
Conservative Prime Minister (2019–2022) Boris Johnson

Boris Johnson became Prime Minister in July 2019. After having lost his working majority to defections and his own suspensions of rebel Members of Parliament, Johnson called a general election on a platform of completing the UK's withdrawal from the European Union. In that general election, the Conservative Party won their biggest majority in Parliament since 1987, and Johnson was able to pass a revised version of May's withdrawal agreement.

Less than two months after the 2019 general election, cases of COVID-19 had reached the UK, and Johnson himself was hospitalised with the disease in March 2020. The government responded to the pandemic in March 2020 by enacting emergency powers and widespread societal measures including several lockdowns, and approved a vaccination programme which began in December 2020. Reception for Johnson's leadership during the COVID-19 pandemic was mixed. The media later reported that there had been social gatherings by the Conservative Party and government staff which contravened COVID-19 restrictions. Johnson was personally implicated, and he, his wife Carrie Johnson, and the chancellor of the exchequer Rishi Sunak, were given fixed penalty notices by the police in April 2022, becoming the first prime minister to be sanctioned for a criminal action while in office. Public dissatisfaction over the events led to a decline in public support for Johnson, the government led by him, and the Conservative Party as a whole.

The publishing of the Sue Gray report in May 2022 and a widespread sense of dissatisfaction led in June 2022 to a vote of confidence in his leadership among Conservative MPs, which he won. In late June 2022, the Conservative MP Chris Pincher resigned as deputy chief government whip after an allegation was made that he had sexually assaulted two men. Johnson initially refused to suspend the whip from him, and his spokesperson said Johnson had not been aware of "specific allegations" against Pincher. On 4 July, Johnson's spokesperson said that Johnson was aware of allegations that were "either resolved or did not proceed to a formal complaint" at the time he appointed him. Several ministers resigned on 5 July, including Sunak and health secretary Sajid Javid. Following dozens of government resignations, Johnson announced on 7 July his intention to resign. Voting in the July–September 2022 Conservative Party leadership election took place between 13 July and 2 September. After a series of MP ballots, the list of candidates was narrowed down to Liz Truss, who served as Foreign Secretary and Minister for Women and Equalities under Johnson's leadership, and Rishi Sunak, who served as Chancellor of the Exchequer until 5 July.

=== Liz Truss: 2022 ===
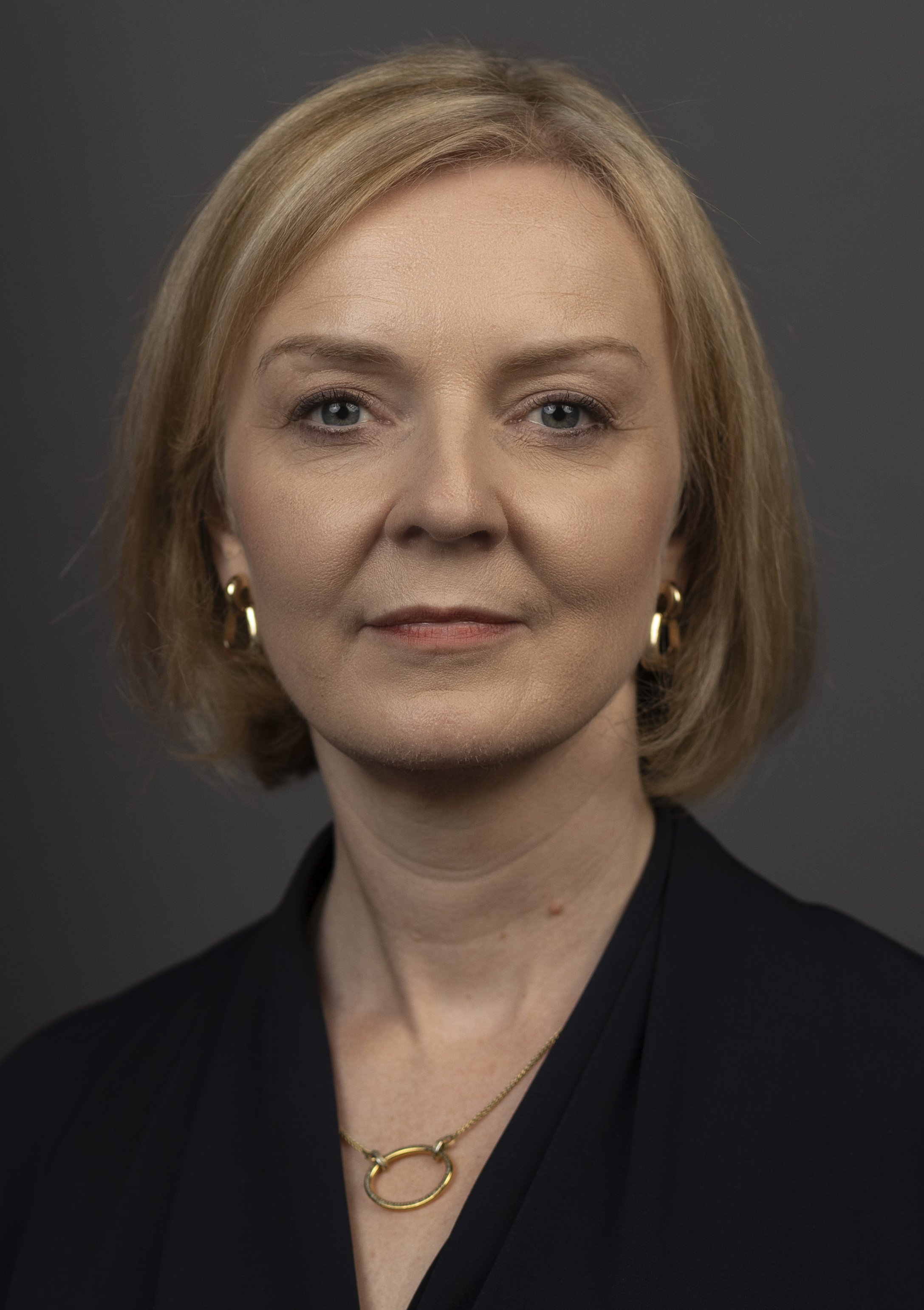
Conservative Prime Minister (2022) Liz Truss

On 5 September, Truss was elected to lead the party, and assumed the premiership on 6 September. Truss was the fifteenth and final prime minister to serve under Elizabeth II, who died two days after appointing Truss. Elizabeth II's death on 8 September caused government business to be suspended during a national mourning period of 10 days. In response to the cost-of-living crisis and energy supply crisis, the Truss ministry announced the Energy Price Guarantee, which reduced energy prices for households, businesses, and public sector organisations.

Truss and her chancellor, Kwasi Kwarteng, announced large-scale tax cuts and borrowing in a mini-budget, which was widely criticised and largely reversed, having led to financial instability. Truss dismissed Kwarteng without explanation on 14 October and appointed Jeremy Hunt to succeed him. On the evening of 19 October, MPs voted to reject a motion which would guarantee parliamentary time for a bill to ban fracking in the UK. The vote was controversial as it was unclear whether a three-line-whip had been issued to Conservative MPs, ordering them to vote against it. Following these events, together with mounting criticism and loss of confidence in her leadership, Truss announced on 20 October her intention to resign as party leader and as prime minister, which made her the shortest-serving prime minister in British history.

=== Rishi Sunak: 2022–2024 ===
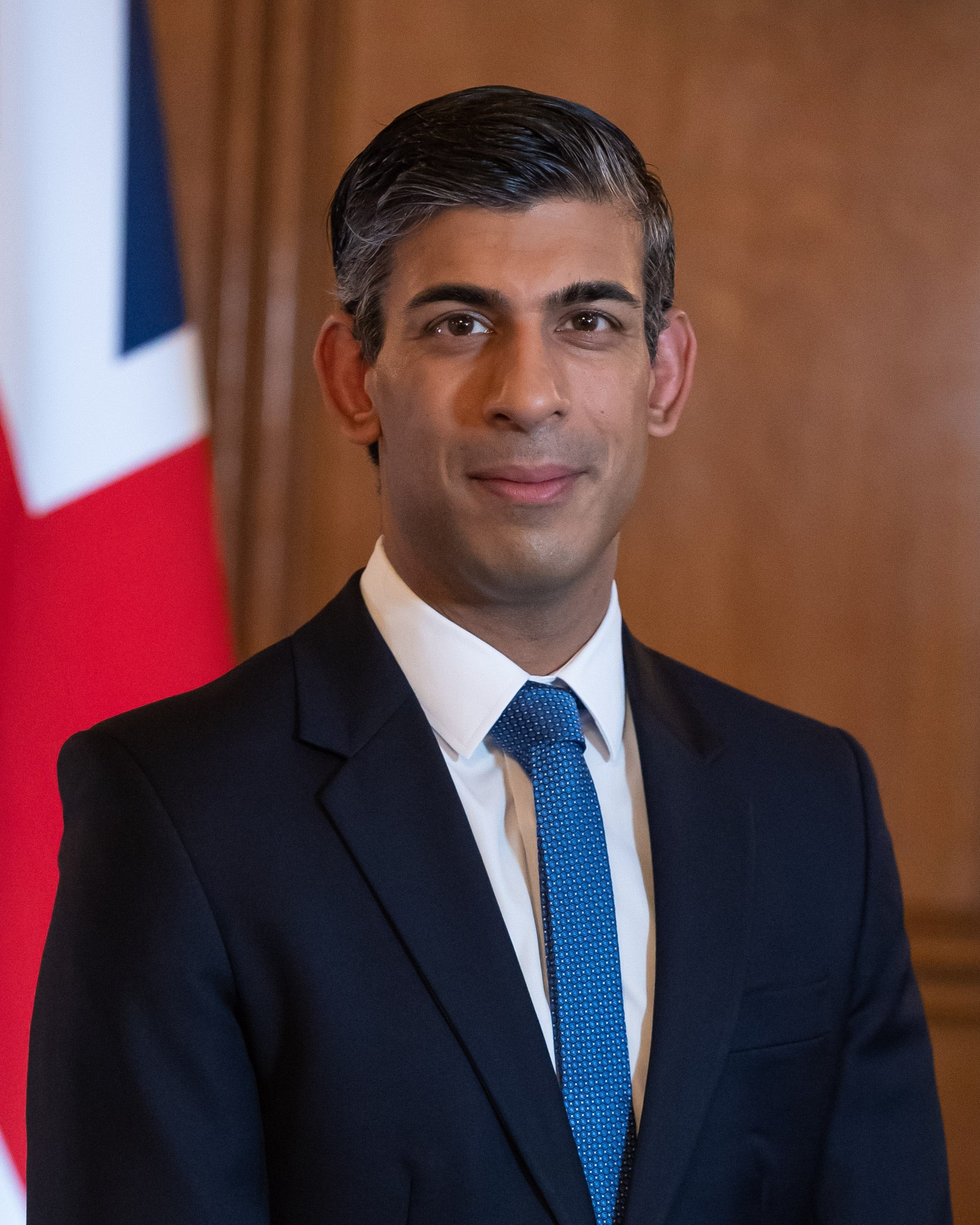
Conservative Prime Minister (2022–2024) Rishi Sunak

Following the October government crisis and Truss' ensuing resignation, a second Conservative Party leadership election for 2022 was held to determine her successor. Only two candidates nominated for the leadership, former chancellor of the exchequer Rishi Sunak and Leader of the House of Commons Penny Mordaunt. Mordaunt ultimately withdrew her nomination two minutes before the deadline on 24 October, leaving Sunak to be elected unopposed. He was appointed prime minister by King Charles III the following morning. Sunak became the first British Asian and the first Hindu to become the UK prime minister and conservative leader.

As prime minister, Sunak has reshuffled his Cabinet twice, the latter of which resulted in the return of the former prime minister David Cameron to frontline politics as foreign secretary. In January 2023, Sunak outlined five key priorities; halving inflation, growing the economy, cutting debt, reducing NHS waiting lists, and stopping the boats, and expected voters to hold his government and himself to account on delivering those goals.

On foreign policy, Sunak has authorised foreign aid and weapons shipments to Ukraine in response to the Russian invasion of the country, promising £2.5 billion in military aid to Ukraine in 2024. In the aftermath of the 2023 Hamas-led attack on Israel, Sunak pledged the United Kingdom's support for Israel and declared that Israel "has an absolute right to defend itself" and has backed calls for humanitarian pauses however, Sunak later condemned the high number of civilian casualties during the Israeli bombardment of Gaza and called for a "sustainable ceasefire".

Under Sunak's leadership, the Conservatives performed poorly at the 2022 and 2023 local elections, where Labour and the Liberal Democrats made gains from Conservatives, often by very wide margins. The parties made further gains in the 2024 local elections. Sunak led his party in the 2024 general election, which resulted in the Conservatives' worst ever election defeat, falling to 121 seats and 24% of the national vote.

== In opposition: 2024–present ==
=== Kemi Badenoch: 2024–present ===
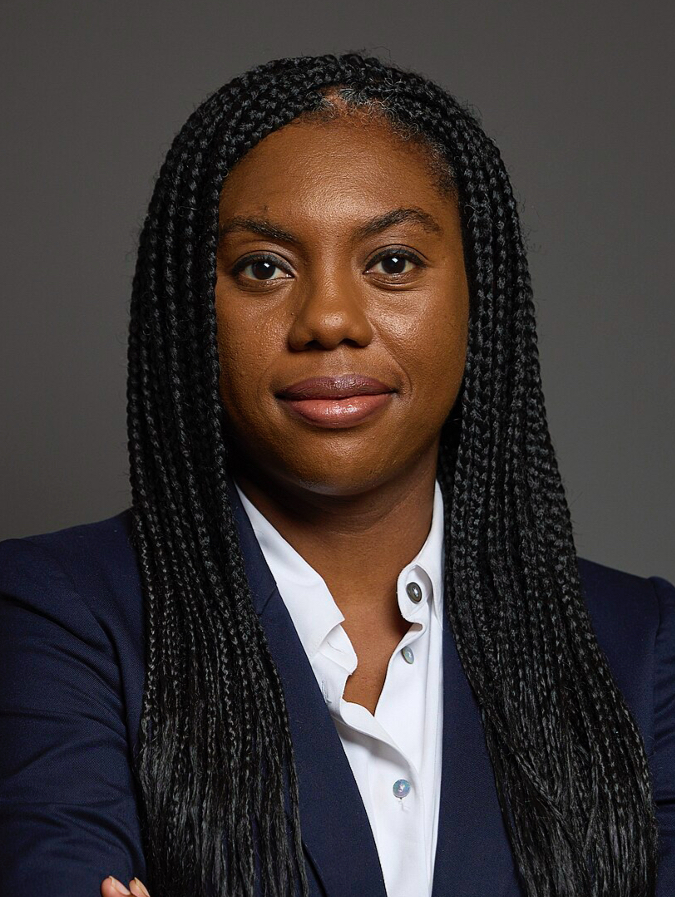
Conservative Leader (2024 - Present) Kemi Badenoch

Following defeat at the 2024 General Election, the ensuing Leadership Race produced six contenders; Kemi Badenoch, Priti Patel, Mel Stride, Robert Jenrick, Tom Tugendhat and James Cleverly. After the defeat of Patel, Stride, Tugendhat then Cleverly, Jenrick and Badenoch would face the members vote. Badenoch defeated Jenrick 53,806 to 41,388 on a 78% turnout, resulting in her election. She became the first black leader of any major UK political party and the fourth woman to lead the Conservative Party, after Margaret Thatcher, Theresa May and Liz Truss.

The post-2024 period has also seen defections from the party to Reform UK such as Robert Jenrick and Suella Braverman.

== See also ==
- History of the Labour Party (UK)
- Liberal Democrat History Group
