= Unionist ministry =

In the United Kingdom of Great Britain and Ireland, a Unionist ministry may refer to the following coalition governments between the Conservative Party and the Liberal Unionist Party:

- Second Salisbury ministry (1887–1892)
- Unionist government, 1895–1905

== See also ==
- Conservative–DUP agreement
- Lib–Con pact
- United Kingdom coalition government (disambiguation)
