= Churchill ministry =

Churchill ministry may refer to:

- Churchill war ministry, the British coalition government led by Winston Churchill from 1940 to 1945
- Churchill caretaker ministry, the British coalition government led by Winston Churchill from May to July 1945
- Third Churchill ministry, the British majority government led by Sir Winston Churchill from 1951 to 1955

== See also ==
- Premiership of Winston Churchill (disambiguation)
- War ministry (disambiguation)
