= Chamberlain ministry =

Chamberlain ministry may refer to:

- First Chamberlain ministry, the British coalition government led by Neville Chamberlain from 1937 to 1939
- Second Chamberlain ministry, the British coalition government led by Neville Chamberlain from 1939 to 1940

== See also ==
- National Government (United Kingdom)
- War ministry (disambiguation)
