= Premiership of Winston Churchill =

Premiership of Winston Churchill may refer to:

- First premiership of Winston Churchill (1940–1945), his first, wartime term as British prime minister
- Second premiership of Winston Churchill (1951–1955), his second, peacetime term as British prime minister

== See also ==
- Churchill ministry (disambiguation)
- Timeline of Winston Churchill's first premiership
- Winston Churchill in the Second World War
