= United Kingdom coalition government =

The United Kingdom has had several coalition governments throughout its history:

- Aberdeen ministry, the British government under Lord Aberdeen (1852–1855)
- Asquith coalition ministry, the British government under H. H. Asquith (1915–1916)
- Lloyd George ministry, the British government under David Lloyd George (1916–1922)
- War ministry, the British government during the Second World War
  - Chamberlain war ministry, the British government under Neville Chamberlain (1939–1940)
  - Churchill war ministry, the British government under Winston Churchill (1940–1945)
- Cameron–Clegg coalition, the British government under David Cameron and Nick Clegg (2010–2015)

== See also ==
- Broad Bottom ministry, a British coalition government dominated by the Pelham brothers (1744–1754)
- Fox–North coalition, the British government dominated by Charles James Fox and Lord North (1783)
- Godolphin–Marlborough ministry, a British coalition government dominated by Lord Godolphin and the Duke of Marlborough (1702–1707)
- National Government (United Kingdom), multiple cross-party British ministries
- Unionist ministry (disambiguation)
