= Lib–Lab pact =

Working arrangement in British politics

In British politics, a Lib–Lab pact is a working arrangement between the Liberal Democrats (in previous times, the Liberal Party) and the Labour Party.

There have been four such arrangements, and one alleged proposal, at the national level. In many local councils in the UK there are similar arrangements, although there are also arrangements where the Lib Dems and Labour oppose each other and instead form a local alliance with another party or with independent councillors.

== 19th century ==
Before the Labour Party had been formed, various candidates stood for Parliament with backing from both the Liberal Party and the Labour Representation League; these included Thomas Burt, Harry Broadhurst and Alexander Macdonald. These MPs were referred to as "Lib–Lab", although there was not a formal pact.

This agreement eventually fell apart with the formation of the Independent Labour Party and the Labour Representation Committee.

== 20th century ==
=== 1903 ===
In 1903, an agreement was made between Herbert Gladstone (then Chief Whip of the Liberal Party) and Ramsay MacDonald (Secretary of the Labour Representation Committee) that, in thirty constituencies, the Labour Party and the Liberal Party would not stand against each other, and thus would avoid the risk of splitting their vote. As a result of this agreement, in contests against the Conservative Party, 29 Labour MPs were returned at the 1906 general election.

=== 1924 ===
At the 1923 general election, both parties campaigned on the issue of free trade. The Conservative Party, which had campaigned to introduce protective tariffs, lost its parliamentary majority but remained the largest party in the House of Commons. The Liberals agreed to enable the formation of the first Labour minority government in 1924, under the leadership of Prime Minister Ramsay MacDonald. The minority government lasted a little over nine months; Conservative Stanley Baldwin succeeded MacDonald as Prime Minister.

=== 1929 ===
At the 1929 general election, Labour won the greatest number of seats, but did not have a parliamentary majority. The now-much-weakened Liberals allowed the formation of the second Labour government by not aligning with the Conservatives to defeat the new government.

=== 1977 ===
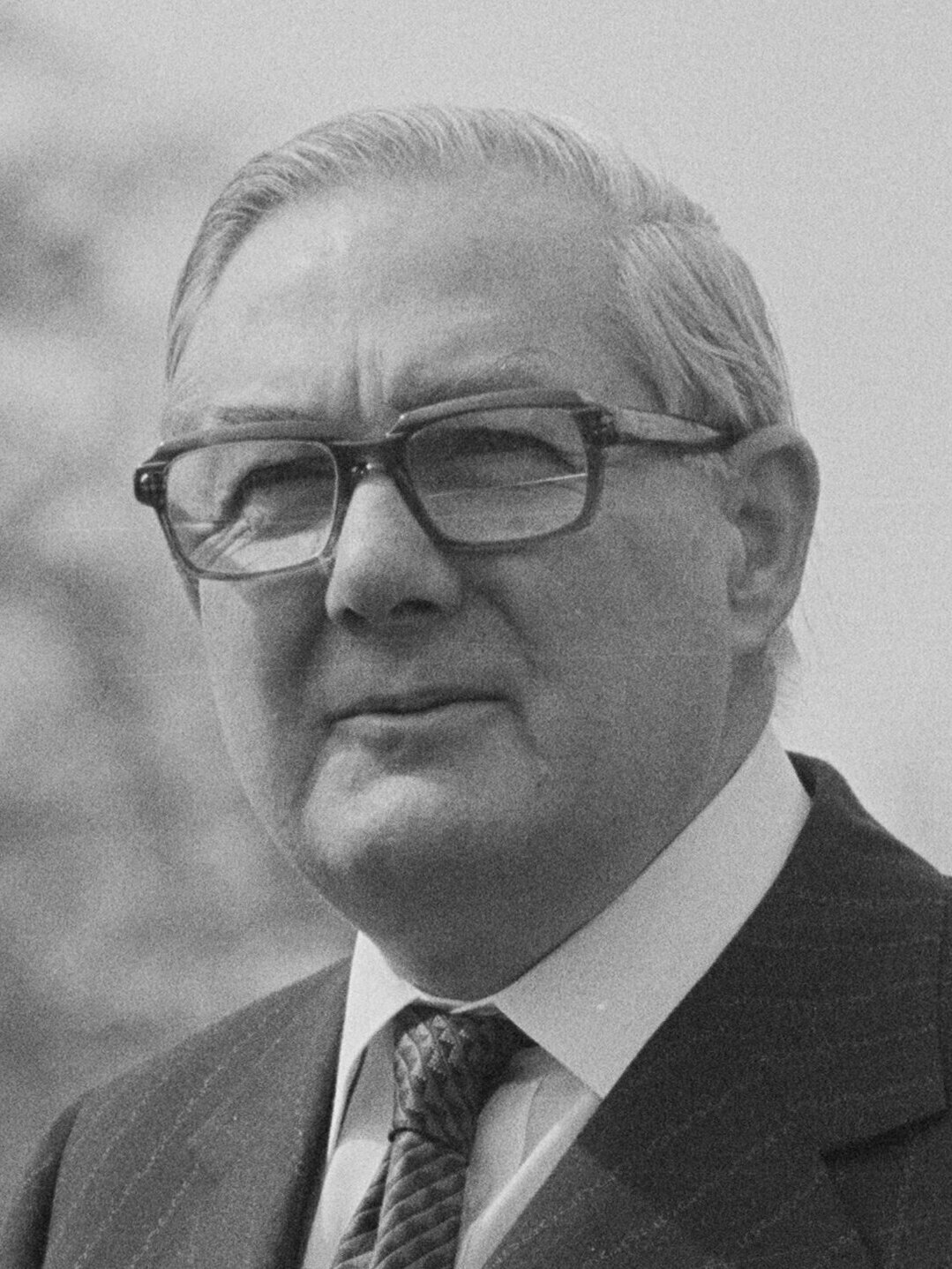
Prime Minister and Leader of the Labour Party, James Callaghan

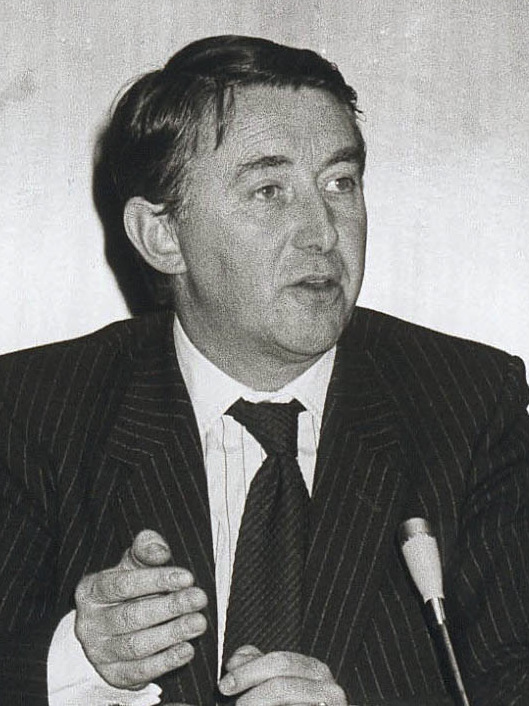
Leader of the Liberal Party, David Steel

In March 1977, the Labour government – lacking a majority following a by-election defeat – faced a motion of no confidence. In order to remain in office, Prime Minister James Callaghan approached the Liberal Party, at the time led by David Steel. Former Foreign Secretary Callaghan had been Prime Minister for just one year, having succeeded Harold Wilson who had led Labour to a three-seat majority at the October 1974 general election.

An agreement was negotiated, under the terms of which the Labour Party accepted a limited number of Liberal Party policy proposals and in exchange, the Liberal Party agreed to vote with the government in any subsequent motion of no confidence. This "pact" was the first official bi-party agreement since the Second World War (there would be a Conservative–Lib Dem coalition following the 2010 general election), though it was far short of a coalition. The Lib–Lab Pact's end was confirmed on 7 September 1978, by which time Callaghan was expected to call a general election, but instead he decided to remain as leader of a minority government. This government fell after a vote of no confidence was passed by one vote in March 1979, whereby Callaghan was forced to hold a general election in May, in which Margaret Thatcher led the Conservatives into power.

=== Proposed coalition of 1997 ===
In the lead-up to the 1997 general election, a coalition government was discussed by Tony Blair and the Lib Dems, according to Paddy Ashdown's The Ashdown Diaries. Ashdown, a strong proponent of a Lib–Lab coalition, said that from Blair's point of view, in order to get the Conservatives out of power and because he wanted to move his party towards the New Labour ideal, a coalition would strengthen his majority in the likely event of a victory. To get the Liberal Democrats into his Cabinet, he allegedly agreed on their terms of electoral reform. Blair was still considering attempting to form a coalition government with the Liberal Democrats on the day of the general election, until the full scale of his Labour Party's majority became clear at 03:05 on the morning of 2 May 1997; ending eighteen years of Conservative rule. Encouraged by former SDP leader Roy Jenkins, Blair still considered bringing the Lib Dems into the Cabinet after his election victory, as he believed this would help to create a political realignment on the centre-left and usher in a period of left-wing unity, and only reneged after Deputy Prime Minister John Prescott threatened to resign over the issue in 1998.

== 21st century ==
=== Proposed coalition of 2010 ===
After the hung parliament resulting from the 2010 general election, the Liberal Democrats, as they had indicated they would do so prior to the election, first began negotiations with the Conservatives—the party that had won the most votes and seats—about the possibility of forming a government; but, after talks appeared to have stalled, complementary negotiations were undertaken with Labour.

Labour's delegation for negotiations included: Peter Mandelson, Andrew Adonis, Ed Miliband and Ed Balls. Press rumours of a possible Lib Dem–Labour deal were publicised, with Prime Minister Gordon Brown alleged to be willing to offer to legislate for a change to the alternative vote system, followed by a referendum on proportional representation, if an arrangement that would keep him in government could be agreed.

A Lib–Lab coalition would, however, have been eight seats short of a majority. A coalition of Labour, the Liberal Democrats, the SDLP, Plaid Cymru, the Alliance Party of Northern Ireland and the Green Party—a "rainbow" or "traffic light" coalition—would have been needed to give a working majority of one. For this, amongst other reasons, the talks failed. On the collapse of talks with Labour, a deal between the Liberal Democrats and the Conservative Party was reached (subsequently being approved by Liberal Democrats members at a special party conference).

There was a significant level of hostility to such a deal within the Labour Party, with coalition proposals being opposed by, among others, former Cabinet ministers John Reid and David Blunkett. John Reid said that such a coalition would be "bad for the country".

David Laws, chief negotiator for the Liberal Democrats in coalition negotiations, subsequently commented on Labour's preparation and conduct in negotiations; his main areas of criticism centred on Labour's lack of contrition about their record over the previous thirteen years, inadequate preparation for discussions, their unwillingness to accommodate Liberal Democrat policy proposals in the potential programme for government, and the arrogant and patronising attitude of specific key Labour figures. He said that whilst he felt Gordon Brown was quite serious about pursuing talks, he believed former minister Ed Balls was deliberately "sabotaging" them.

=== Possible coalition after 2015 general election ===
Nick Clegg stated his opinion prior to the 2010 general election that the party which wins the most seats but fails to get an absolute majority in the house has the right to attempt to form a government first, either on their own or in a coalition. He stated his willingness to work with the Labour Party if it won a plurality of the votes in 2015. However, some reports said it was unlikely that this would happen under the leadership of Nick Clegg, as both Ed Miliband and Ed Balls voiced discontent with Nick Clegg over his partnership with David Cameron. Later reports indicated that Miliband and Balls were more relaxed with the thought of a Lib–Lab government after the 2015 election. According to an article in The Daily Telegraph, a shadow Cabinet minister who was close to Miliband said: "Our activists really hate Clegg. But if having him as Deputy Prime Minister was the price of getting Ed into Number 10 then they would have to stick it." For years, Miliband is said to have refused to speak to Clegg, although relations thawed as the 2015 election grew closer. A senior party figure said, "The contact is there and the leaders' offices are now in touch." Senior members of Miliband's team, including Lord Adonis, the former Cabinet minister, had been urging him privately to prepare for fresh coalition negotiations after the 2015 general election because opinion polls suggested no party would win an outright majority in 2015.

In 2014, Lib Dem minister Norman Lamb warned that "it could be enormously damaging for [the Lib Dems]" if the party went into coalition with Miliband's Labour. However, neither a coalition nor a pact between the Lib Dems and Labour was possible, following the Conservatives winning a majority at the 2015 general election and the loss of 49 Liberal Democrat seats. The scale of victory was unexpected by all major polls, and this was the first time a Conservative majority government had been formed in 23 years.

=== Possible coalition after 2019 general election ===
Jo Swinson, the Liberal Democrat leader, hinted at a possible alliance after the 2019 general election in the event that Jeremy Corbyn resigned as Labour leader. Once again, this was not possible, because the Conservatives received a majority of seats at the election, meaning that a Lib–Lab pact would be below the majority mark.

=== Possible coalition after the 2024 general election ===
In the 2023 local elections both Labour and the Liberal Democrats made gains. Both Keir Starmer, the Labour leader, and Ed Davey, the Liberal Democrat leader, refused to rule out a possible alliance after the 2024 general election. On 13 June 2023, Labour Party National Campaign Coordinator Shabana Mahmood ruled out a Lib–Lab pact in the by-elections in Mid Bedfordshire, Uxbridge and South Ruislip and Selby and Ainsty.

== Welsh Parliament ==
When the first elections to the new Welsh Assembly took place in 1999 no one party had an absolute majority, and initially Labour sought to run a minority administration. Following a series of close votes and much criticism of the weakness of the Assembly administration, Labour and the Liberal Democrats formed a coalition in October 2000 with the two parties sharing power, including ministerial appointments, with Labour the majority party. The agreement ended at the elections of 2003 when Labour won 50% of the seats and decided to form a minority government.

On 11 May 2016, following the 2016 election six days earlier, when the governing Labour Party had 29 AMs elected, one fewer than in 2011 and two short of an overall majority, Welsh Assembly members failed to elect a new First Minister on their return to the Senedd, after the roll-call tied the vote at 29–29; Plaid Cymru nominated its leader Leanne Wood, and won the backing of the Conservatives and UKIP, while Labour's incumbent First Minister Carwyn Jones won the support of sole Liberal Democrat Kirsty Williams, the only non-Labour member to back Jones in the tied vote for First Minister (and who, up until the day after the election, had been the leader of the Welsh Liberal Democrats), and his own party. On 19 May 2016, after Jones was reinstalled unopposed as First Minister, following a deal with Plaid Cymru, Williams was named Cabinet Secretary for Education in Jones's new Welsh Government; her appointment as Education Secretary was subject to ratification by Liberal Democrat members at a special conference in Newtown, Powys, on 21 May 2016 and was overwhelmingly approved.

== Scottish Parliament ==
After the first general election to the reconvened Scottish Parliament in 1999, the Scottish Liberal Democrats signed up to what was termed a "partnership government" with Labour, with both parties providing ministers in a shared government.

Although standing on separate manifestos in the succeeding 2003 Scottish Parliament election the joint working continued, with Labour's Jack McConnell serving as First Minister, and the Lib Dems' Jim Wallace serving under him as Deputy First Minister (and Minister for Enterprise and Lifelong Learning) who was then succeeded by Nicol Stephen of the same party as Deputy First Minister.

The Scottish Parliament general election of 2007 saw the Scottish National Party (SNP) surpass Labour as the largest party by one seat. The Scottish Liberal Democrats decided against coalition with either the SNP or Labour, and abstained in the vote for First Minister, won by SNP leader Alex Salmond.

== Gibraltarian Parliament ==
The major UK political parties do not stand candidates for election in the Gibraltar Parliament, but form affiliations with the local Gibraltarian parties, with the Liberal Democrats affiliating with the Liberal Party of Gibraltar (LPG) and Labour affiliating with the Gibraltar Socialist Labour Party (GSLP). The two parties formed the GSLP–Liberal Alliance in 2000 and together have been the government in power since 2011.

== Constitutional committee ==
Whilst not a pact, ahead of the 1997 election Labour Leader Tony Blair and Lib Dem leader Paddy Ashdown set up the Labour-Liberal Democrat joint committee on constitutional reform to discuss devolution in Wales and Scotland, and led to Prime Minister Tony Blair setting up a joint Lib–Lab cabinet committee. In part this led to the Scottish and Welsh alliances noted above. The committee was disbanded by Tony Blair and Charles Kennedy in September 2001.

== See also ==
- Conservative–DUP agreement
- Lib–Con pact
- Progressive alliance (UK)
- Purple coalition (similar governing arrangement found in Belgium and the Netherlands)
- Lib-Lab-Con
