= Liberal Democrat History Group =

Organisation interested in the history of the Liberal Democrats

The Liberal Democrat History Group is an organisation interested in the history of United Kingdom political party the Liberal Democrats, and its predecessor parties, the Liberal Party and the Social Democratic Party. The Group also promotes an interest in progressive politics in Britain before the formation of the Liberal Party in 1859 going back through the Whigs to the time of the English Civil War and to the philosophy of liberalism more generally.

The Group publishes a quarterly journal, The Journal of Liberal History, has its own website, publishes books, sponsors meetings in London and jointly with other organisations and organises fringe events at the Liberal Democrat conferences.

== See also ==
- History of the Labour Party (UK)
- History of the Conservative Party (UK)
