= Timetable For Action =

The Timetable For Action is a policy document by the U.K. Conservative Party, in which leader Michael Howard spells out some key actions he would take if elected Prime Minister, within the first hour, day, week, and month of a Conservative government.

== Timing and rationale ==
The document was released during the Conservative Party's annual party conference in October 2004, widely speculated to be the last before a rumoured general election in May 2005. Key to Howard's address to the conference were the issues of accountability and trust; the Timetable was intended to give the voters a sort of checklist, so they could tell if a (hypothetical) Conservative government was keeping its promises.

At roughly the same time, opinion polls suggested that only 12% of the British people believed Howard would win the next election. Most predicted that the ruling Labour Party under Tony Blair would prevail.

== Timetable highlights ==
These are some of the policies Howard lays out. There are others.

Within the first hour:
- I will make the Office for National Statistics independent of ministers.

Within the first day:
- I will set a date for the referendum on the European Constitution.
- The Health Secretary will abolish targets imposed by Whitehall on hospitals.
- I will announce the appointment of a Minister for Homeland Security with responsibility for counter-terrorism and emergency planning.

Within the first week:
- The Home Secretary will announce the ending of Labour's early release from prison scheme.
- The Health Secretary will make it possible for people to have access to information about hospital performance, including on infection rates.

Within the first month:
- We will set out our program of legislation to:

- Introduce a points system for immigration ... priority [will be] given to people who want to come to Britain to work hard and make a positive contribution.
- Require drug addicts to choose between immediate rehabilitation in secure accommodation or prosecution and prison.
- Abolish student fees and provide more money to universities.

- The Immigration Minister will set in train 24-hour surveillance at ports of entry.
- The Home Secretary will start our new prison building programme, and the recruitment of an extra 5,000 police officers each year.

== Comments ==
Many of the policies are traditional Conservative policies - the party (and Michael Howard) have always been seen as tough on crime, as Eurosceptic, and as taking a hard line on immigration. Others aim at reducing bureaucracy (e.g. hospital targets) and creating a "smaller government", on the theory that workers in the public services should be allowed to simply get on with their jobs. The policy of making the Office for National Statistics independent appears to be an attempt to capitalise on a public perception of Labour as a "party of spin" who manipulate figures.

Notable by its absence is any firm commitment to reducing tax. In his speech at the party conference, Howard said that he would not make promises he could not keep.
