= Lib–Con pact =

Working arrangement in British politics

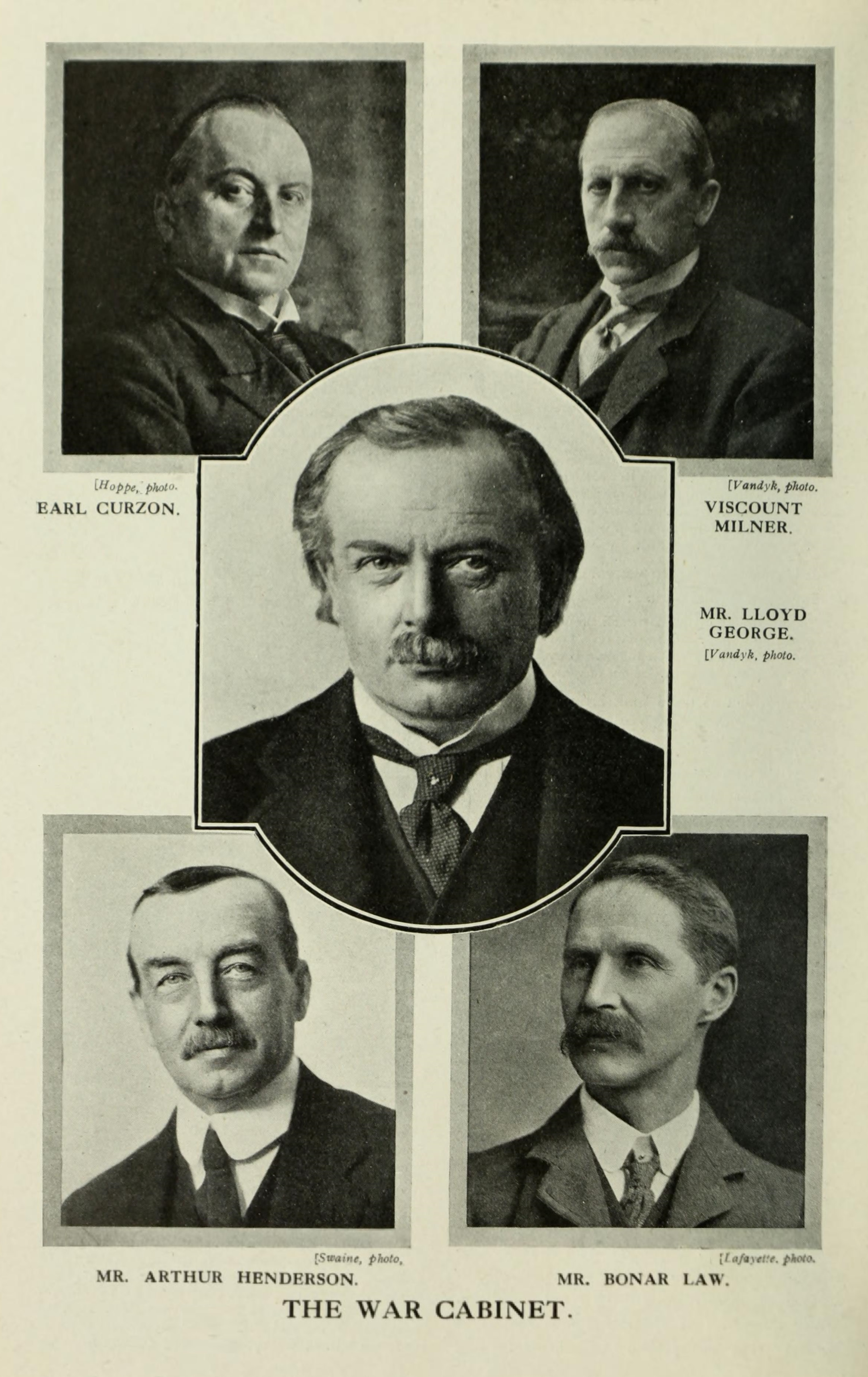
The 1916 War Cabinet, which contained both Liberal and Conservative ministers.

In British politics, a Lib–Con pact is a working arrangement between the Liberal Democrats (or its predecessor the Liberal Party) and the Conservatives.

The Liberal and Conservative parties had several working agreements in the first half of the 20th century. Since the Second World War there has been one such arrangement, the 2010 Conservative–Liberal Democrat coalition agreement, at the national level. In many local councils in the UK there are arrangements between the two parties, although there are also arrangements where the Liberal Democrats and Conservatives oppose each other or form local alliances with other parties or with independent councillors. Ahead of the 2017 general election, it was suggested that a new coalition between the parties could be proposed, although this was later ruled out by Liberal Democrat leader, Tim Farron.

== 20th century ==
Conservatives and Liberals joined together in all-party governments during both World Wars as well as during the "Coupon" coalition of 1918–1922 and the first two years of National Government in 1931–1933.

After the official Liberal Party withdrew from the latter government in 1933, another faction, the National Liberals, remained in coalition with the Conservatives. This coalition was maintained during formation of the wartime government, and the National Liberals would later fight and lose the 1945 general election in alliance with the Conservatives. The National Liberals and Conservatives merged at constituency level in 1947 and fully assimilated in 1968.

Following the February 1974 general election, which resulted in a hung parliament, Conservative prime minister Edward Heath attempted to negotiate a coalition with Liberal leader Jeremy Thorpe. The negotiations ultimately failed and a Labour minority government was formed, with Harold Wilson becoming prime minister again. The minority government was seen as unworkable, and another general election was called for October; in which Labour won a narrow majority of three seats.

== 21st century ==
=== Coalition of 2010–2015 ===
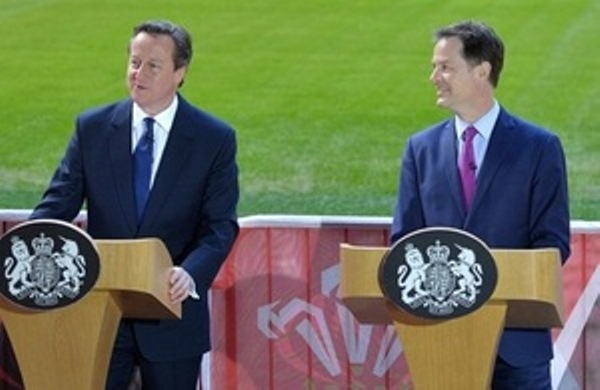
David Cameron and Nick Clegg at the Millennium Stadium in Cardiff during the coalition government

Following the 2010 general election resulting in a hung parliament with the Conservatives as the largest party, the Liberal Democrats and Conservatives agreed to form a formal coalition. This saw both the Conservatives and Liberal Democrats enter government together, with Conservative leader David Cameron as prime minister and Liberal Democrat leader Nick Clegg as deputy prime minister. The parties continued to contest by-elections and local elections against each other. The coalition lasted until the 2015 general election, which saw the Conservatives win a majority of seats and form a government, while the Liberal Democrats lost 49 of their 57 seats.

=== 2017 general election ===
In January 2017, the leader of the Liberal Democrats, Tim Farron, ruled out an electoral pact between Labour and the Liberal Democrats, citing Labour's "electorally toxic" leader Jeremy Corbyn as the reason, but at this stage he refused to rule out a coalition with the Conservatives. Sir Vince Cable, the former Secretary of State for Business, Innovation and Skills, also told news outlets on 19 April 2017 that the Liberal Democrats would not enter into a coalition with Labour. On 22 April 2017, Farron ruled out making any agreement with the Conservatives in the event of a hung parliament, stating that there would be "no pact, no deal, no coalition" with either of the two main parties. Farron confirmed this stance on 9 June 2017, the day after the 2017 general election, which resulted in the Conservatives losing their majority. Instead, the Conservatives formed a confidence and supply arrangement with the Democratic Unionist Party (DUP) of Northern Ireland.

== See also ==
- Conservative–DUP agreement
- Lib–Lab pact
- Lib-Lab-Con
