= Conservative–DUP agreement =

2017 UK confidence and supply agreement

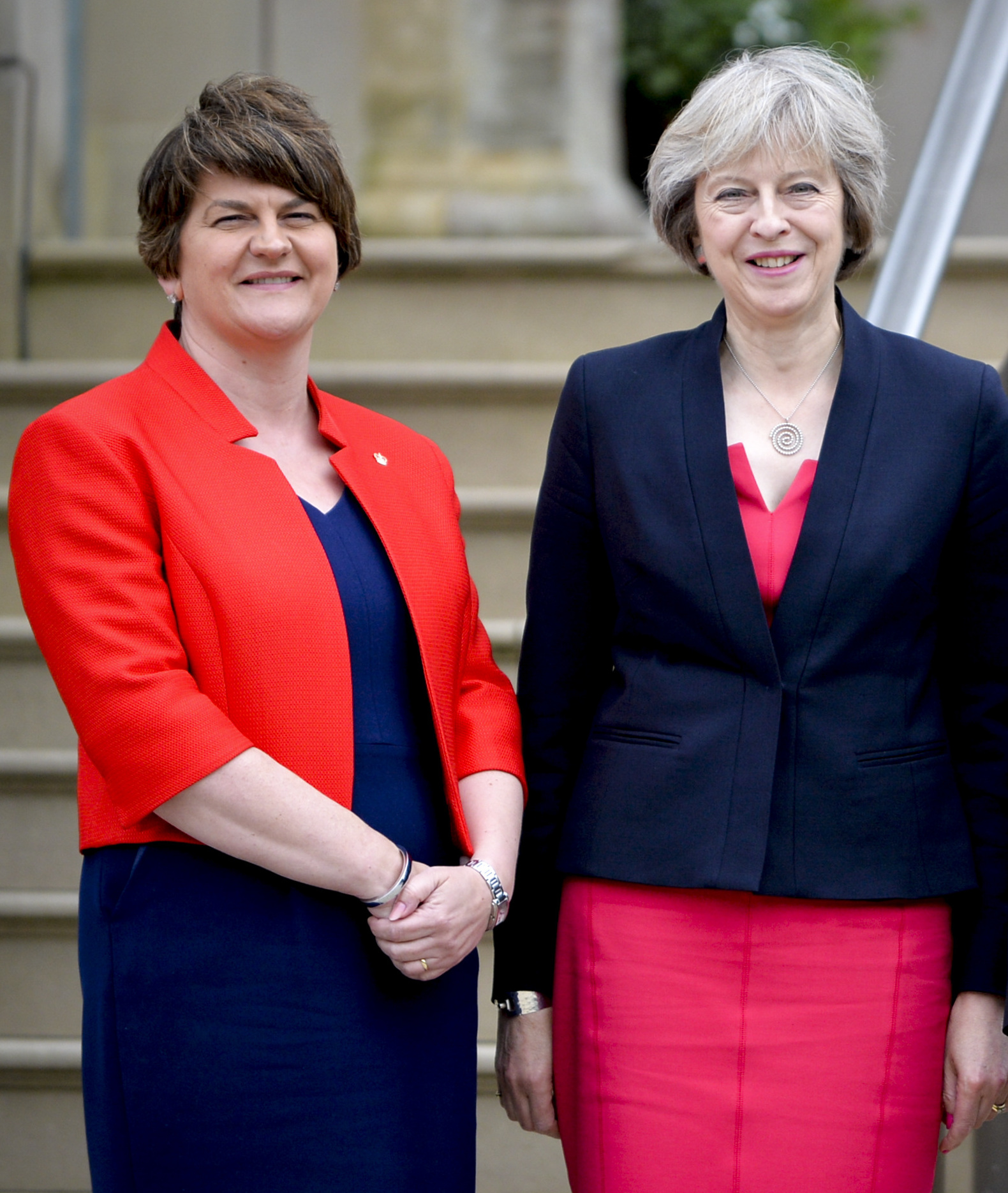
Prime Minister May (right) meets with DUP leader Arlene Foster in 2016.

The Conservative–DUP agreement was a confidence and supply agreement between the Conservative Party and the Democratic Unionist Party (DUP) following the 2017 general election which resulted in a hung parliament. Negotiations between the two parties began on 9 June 2017, the day after the election, and the final agreement was signed and published on 26 June 2017.

The agreement, signed by the two parties' chief whips, Gavin Williamson for the Conservatives and Jeffrey Donaldson for the DUP, secured DUP Confidence and supply support for a Conservative minority government led by Theresa May.

== Conservative–DUP dialogue before 2017 ==
=== Prior to the 2010 and 2015 general elections ===
Previously the Conservatives cooperated with the DUP's main unionist rival, the Ulster Unionist Party (UUP), whose MPs took the Conservative whip at Westminster until that arrangement was ended in 1974. Relations between the Conservatives and UUP worsened following the Anglo-Irish Agreement of 1985, although the two parties continued to work together, especially after the 1992 election when John Major's government had to rely on their support. In January 2010, the then Conservative leader David Cameron held talks with both the UUP and DUP about an electoral pact for the 2010 general election. The Conservatives had already formed an electoral alliance with the UUP (see Ulster Conservatives and Unionists) in 2009, but had previously rejected DUP calls for agreed unionist candidates in selected Northern Ireland seats. The prospect of a unionist pact caused disquiet on the part of some members of the Northern Ireland Conservatives, and ultimately a pact with the DUP was rejected. The Ulster Conservatives and Unionists electoral pact ended after the party failed to win any Northern Ireland seats in the 2010 general election. The UUP failed to win any seats in Parliament until 2015, with Danny Kinahan in South Antrim and Tom Elliott in Fermanagh and South Tyrone.

In October 2014, it was reported by the Financial Times that informal discussions were taking place between the Conservatives and the DUP ahead of the 2015 general election, which was widely expected to result in a hung parliament. The DUP had also offered conditional support to the Labour Party, if it should emerge as the largest party. The 2015 election resulted in a Conservative majority, and no public agreement with the DUP was struck.

It subsequently emerged that the Labour Party had explored securing DUP support during both the 2010 and 2015 general elections.

According to The Daily Telegraph, representatives of the Conservative leadership drew up a "draft agreement" with the DUP following the 2015 general election, in order to help increase the small Conservative majority in the event of a vote of no confidence. Neither party confirmed that they engaged in talks in 2015 as The Telegraph had described.

=== 2015–17: Conservative majority ===
A formal "draft agreement" between the two parties was reached in the days following the 2015 general election, after that election resulted in a Conservative majority. The draft co-operation deal, which was never ratified and not made public at the time, stated that the DUP agreed to support the government in any no-confidence motion, and some other matters, excluding welfare reforms, Northern Ireland related issues and matters relating to devolution of powers throughout the UK.

Under Theresa May, the relationship developed further. The Conservatives and DUP entered informal arrangements in 2016, in order to increase the working majority for the Conservative government. The DUP had hosted a reception at the Conservative Party conference on 4 October 2016. James Brokenshire, the Conservative Secretary of State for Northern Ireland, was set to attend a DUP fundraiser on 27 October 2016, but later backed out due to the controversy that arose from this. Since May became Prime Minister, until the 2017 general election, the DUP voted with the Conservatives 77% of the time.

== 2017 Conservative–DUP agreement ==
=== Background ===
The composition of the House of Commons after the 2017 election, showing the Northern Ireland parties on the right. The DUP (brown) would appear to hold the balance of power. Meanwhile, Sinn Féin (green) have had the official policy of their MPs not assuming seats by taking the oaths required (or statutory declarations in lieu) and otherwise abstaining from the UK Parliament since their establishment (in their original form) in 1905. Conservative Party (317) Democratic Unionist Party (10) Labour Party (262) Scottish National Party (35) Liberal Democrats (12) Sinn Féin (7) (abstentionist) Plaid Cymru (4) Green Party (1) Independent Unionist (1) Speaker (1)

The 2017 snap election resulted in a hung parliament, with the Conservative Party having returned the most seats in the House of Commons with 317 Conservative MPs, but without an overall majority needed to govern (326 out of 650 seats). The DUP, which won 10 seats in the election (its best Westminster electoral performance to date), suggested it would be able to provide a coalition or Confidence and supply arrangement depending on negotiations. Theresa May, incumbent Conservative prime minister, announced her intention on 9 June 2017 to form a new minority government with support from the DUP, whom she described as "friends and allies". Initially, both parties implied that this support would be in the form of a confidence-and-supply agreement, with the DUP backing a Conservative Queen's Speech and certain other elements of the government's legislative agenda. However, in the afternoon of 10 June, it was reported by Robert Peston that May was in fact seeking to 'enter into a formal coalition agreement as opposed to the less formal "confidence-and-supply" arrangement', having sent a team of officials headed by Chief Whip Gavin Williamson to negotiate a deal in Belfast. Despite this, later that evening it was announced that the DUP had agreed, so far, only to the principles of a "confidence" deal with the Conservatives, which would be discussed by the Cabinet on 12 June.

Later still, Downing Street issued a statement reporting a Conservative–DUP agreement had been reached in principle. Yet a few hours later, in the early hours of Sunday 11 June, the statement was retracted when it was claimed according to Sky News that it had been "issued in error", and that talks between the Conservative Party and DUP were still ongoing. Williamson had outlined a deal that would provide the government with "certainty and stability", but the DUP rejected any finalisation – simply stating talks had been "positive". On 12 June it was suggested that the Queen's Speech, which had been due to set out the government's legislative agenda on 19 June, could be delayed to give the DUP and Conservatives more time to negotiate. It was reported that the ongoing dialogue could have delayed the start of Brexit negotiations with the EU, which were also due to begin on 19 June.

On the afternoon of 13 June, Arlene Foster, the DUP leader who had travelled to London for negotiations with May, stated that discussions had gone well and that there were "no outstanding issues" left between the two parties. Following the meeting, it was reported by Sky News journalists David Blevins and Connor Sephton that Foster did not return to Belfast as planned, instead choosing to remain in London to continue the talks, and that a DUP source confirmed that a deal would be reached "within the next 24 hours." On the same day, the British Parliament reconvened. However, on 14 June DUP sources stated that no announcement of an agreement would be made that day, as it was deemed to be "inappropriate" to do so while events relating to the Grenfell Tower fire, which had begun in the early hours of the morning, were still developing. The DUP released a statement claiming that the arrangement was already 95 percent agreed upon, thus downplaying speculation that the announcement could be delayed another week. On 15 June, the new Conservative Leader of the House of Commons, Andrea Leadsom, announced that the date of the Queen's Speech had been set for 21 June (two days later than originally planned), and that the speech would go ahead regardless of whether the agreement with the DUP had been finalised; Brexit talks started on the scheduled date of June 19 as well.

Amid some concern that the lack of a finalised deal could lead to DUP MPs abstaining in the vote to pass the Queen's Speech, Arlene Foster stated that her MPs would support the Conservative government's first test in the Commons as it was "right and proper" to do so. By 20 June, the day before the Queen's Speech, talks between the two parties had been ongoing for 10 days. It was reported that senior DUP sources told the BBC that the Conservatives should not "take the DUP for granted", and that talks had not proceeded in the way the party leadership had anticipated. On 21 June, a senior DUP MP, Sir Jeffrey Donaldson denied media reports that talks were stalling between the Tories and DUP. He confirmed that while the DUP was asking HM Treasury for an increased budget for Northern Ireland infrastructure spending, it was not the large £2bn investment reported by some media outlets. On the morning of 26 June, Foster returned to Downing Street with Nigel Dodds and stated that she was hopeful that an agreement would be announced later that day.

==== Reactions to the proposed agreement ====
The proposed agreement attracted criticism and forewarning from some politicians and organisations, and faced a degree of opposition from within the Conservative Party itself.

Welsh Labour minister Jo Stevens, the Deputy Leader of the Green Party of England and Wales Amelia Womack and the British Pregnancy Advisory Service criticised the DUP's anti-abortion stance and expressed concern about the party's possible influence in the minority government. LGBT+ Conservatives and Scottish Conservatives leader Ruth Davidson (as she herself pointed out, a Scottish Protestant planning a marriage to an Irish Catholic woman) criticised DUP stances on social issues, in particular on LGBT rights. Davidson demanded a "categoric assurance" from Theresa May that "there would be absolutely no rescission of LGBTI rights in the rest of the UK" and that the government "would use any influence that we had to advance LGBTI rights in Northern Ireland". Davidson later said that she been given an assurance by May that gay rights would not be eroded in return for DUP support. Conservative MP Sarah Wollaston also stated her public opposition to any DUP influence on the government's social policy. In response to these concerns, Conservative Defence Secretary Sir Michael Fallon stated that the agreement would focus on the "big economic issues" and that the Conservative Party did not agree with the DUP's stance on several social matters.

Commentary in the media also drew attention to the DUP's historic links with the Ulster Resistance, an Ulster loyalist paramilitary movement which was established in Northern Ireland in 1986 by leading members of the party. Emma Little-Pengelly, who was elected DUP MP for Belfast South in the 2017 election, is the daughter of Noel Little, one of the "Paris Three" arms traffickers arrested in 1989. The former DUP mayor of Ballymoney, Ian Stevenson, attracted criticism when he posted an altered photograph on Twitter showing the flag of the paramilitary Ulster Volunteer Force (UVF) flying outside 10 Downing Street. Stevenson apologised, claiming that he had confused the flag with the banner of the Apprentice Boys of Derry.

The Irish government under outgoing Taoiseach Enda Kenny expressed concerns that a parliamentary deal between a British government and the DUP could put the Northern Ireland peace process at risk, a view also expressed by Sinn Féin politicians Gerry Adams and Gerry Kelly, Labour MP Yvette Cooper and former Downing Street Director of Communications Alastair Campbell. This opinion was, however, rejected by the Conservative leadership and former Secretary of State for Northern Ireland, Theresa Villiers, as well as by former Labour minister Caroline Flint who suggested that Gordon Brown may have sought an agreement with the DUP in 2010. The Conservative peer and former UUP First Minister of Northern Ireland, David Trimble, described claims that an agreement would put the peace process at risk as "scaremongering". On 13 June former Conservative Prime Minister John Major publicly urged May to govern without DUP support and not pursue a deal, on the grounds that an agreement could "damage" the "fragile" Northern Ireland peace process, suggesting the government must remain 'impartial'. Major himself had an agreement with the Unionist MPs of the UUP when in power and during peace negotiations in Northern Ireland, though not with the more hardline and socially-conservative DUP. On 15 June Sinn Féin's Gerry Adams met with Theresa May, telling her that he thought she was in breach of the Good Friday Agreement. This has been disputed by one of the UUP's negotiators for the Belfast Agreement.

An online petition against the Conservative–DUP agreement, which also calls for Theresa May's resignation, surpassed 640,000 signatures in the days following the election.

The chairman of the NI Conservatives, Alan Dunlop, in contrast stated he was "quite happy" with the arrangements, commenting that “It’s either put up with the DUP or get Jeremy Corbyn”. Whilst acknowledging that some members of the party were dissatisfied with the alliance, he iterated that the alliance did not require the two parties to share the same views.

=== The agreement ===
Conservative–DUP agreement
- Leader: Theresa May (until July 2019); Boris Johnson (after July 2019); Arlene Foster
- Founded: 26 June 2017
- Dissolved: 6 November 2019
- House of Commons: 327 / 650
- House of Lords (numbers provided at end of 2019): 245 / 766

On 26 June 2017, Downing Street announced that a final agreement between the DUP and the Conservatives had been finalised and signed by Gavin Williamson for the Conservatives and Jeffrey Donaldson for the DUP, the two parties' Chief Whips, in the presence of the two party leaders. The arrangement would see Theresa May lead a minority Conservative government supported legislatively by the DUP. The agreement was published the same day, a form of contract parliamentarism. It would see the DUP support the Conservative minority government on all votes in the UK Parliament relating to the following issues for the duration of the parliament:

- All motions of confidence
- The Queen's Speech
- The Budget
- Finance bills, money bills and appropriation legislation
- Legislation pertaining to the UK's exit from the European Union
- Legislation pertaining to national security

Other key points of the agreement included:

- The ongoing commitment of the Conservative Party to the Union of Great Britain and Northern Ireland
- The UK's 2% defence spending target will continue to be met, in accordance with NATO requirements
- Cash support for farmers will remain at current levels until the next election
- Both parties agree to adhere to the provisions of the Good Friday Agreement
- No poll or referendum on the future of Northern Ireland's constitutional status will be held without the "consent of the people"
- The commitment of the DUP to work towards the formation of a new Northern Ireland Executive; and the commitment of the UK Government to work with Northern Irish parties and the Irish government on this objective
- Implementation of the Armed Forces Covenant in Northern Ireland

The agreement stated that votes related to any other matters in the Commons will be agreed on a case-by-case basis, overseen by a coordination committee made up of both parties. The DUP secured an extra £1 billion of funding for Northern Ireland, with the money focused on health, infrastructure and education budgets. Following the announcement of the agreement, the Government stated that this additional funding would not result in increased budgets in Scotland or Wales, as the money will not be subject to the Barnett formula. The deal also saw the Conservatives drop their 2017 manifesto commitments to pension and winter fuel allowance changes.

==== Reactions to the agreement ====
The DUP leader, Arlene Foster, said that the agreement was "good for Northern Ireland and the UK".

Others questioned whether or not the UK Government could maintain its role as neutral arbiter of the Good Friday Agreement if its survival depended on the cooperation of a specific unionist political party from Northern Ireland. The DUP-Conservative deal itself came about with the background of a Northern Ireland Assembly which had been suspended since 26 January 2017, with talks to form a power-sharing executive after the latest Assembly election on 2 March yet to prove fruitful. Sinn Féin leader Martin McGuinness claimed that Theresa May was herself already in breach of the Good Friday Agreement and that the new deal could further hamper the formation of a power-sharing executive. He further added in an op-ed to the Guardian that the agreement's provisions for guaranteed funding were taking place after the loss of over a billion pounds over the past 10 years for Northern Ireland and with a Conservative Party whose political agenda (such as pledges to repeal the Human Rights Act and put an end to the European Court of Justice and the European Convention on Human Rights jurisdiction in the UK) was, in his opinion, at odds with the foundations of a shared and peaceful future for Northern Ireland under the Good Friday (Belfast) Agreement.

The Leader of the Opposition, Jeremy Corbyn, was critical of the deal, saying that he believed that the "Tory-DUP deal is clearly not in the national interest but in May’s party’s interest to help her cling to power". The outgoing leader of the Liberal Democrats, Tim Farron, also criticised it, saying "The public will not be duped by this shoddy little deal. While our schools are crumbling and our NHS is in crisis, Theresa May chooses to throw cash at ten MPs in a grubby attempt to keep her cabinet squatting in Number 10".

The funding implications of the deal were criticised by Welsh First Minister Carwyn Jones, who was quoted as saying it was an "outrageous straight bung to keep a weak prime minister and a faltering government in office" adding that the Prime Minister must have discovered a "magic money tree" to provide £1 billion just for Northern Ireland, and described the deal as essentially "cash for votes". The leader of Plaid Cymru, Leanne Wood, echoed these sentiments, describing the deal as a "bribe". In response, former Conservative Welsh Secretary Stephen Crabb said the deal was "the cost of doing business" to keep his party in power.

There was particular criticism that the additional spending in Northern Ireland will not lead to matched additional funding in other parts of the country through the Barnett formula. Scottish Conservative leader, Ruth Davidson, stated that it was "absurd" to criticise UK government spending in addition to the Barnett in Northern Ireland, when "the exact same thing happens in Scotland".

=== After signing of agreement ===
In September 2017, the DUP broke with the Conservatives for the first time since the signing of the agreement in order to back non-binding Labour motions on the issues of university tuition fees and pay for NHS employees. DUP Chief Whip Jeffrey Donaldson insisted the vote "doesn't threaten the deal", and noted that the party "[reserves] the right to vote on the basis of our own manifesto" in their agreement with the government.

Later that month, Environment Secretary Michael Gove headlined a fundraising event for the DUP hosted by Ian Paisley Jr.

In October 2017, Foster and the DUP MPs held another reception at the Conservative Party conference, which was attended by leading Conservative figures including First Secretary of State Damian Green, Brexit Secretary David Davis, Chief Whip Gavin Williamson, and party chairman Patrick McLoughlin. This was reciprocated in November, when Damian Green and Conservative Chief Whip Julian Smith attended the DUP's conference, with Smith giving a keynote address.

During February 2018, former International Development Secretary Priti Patel also headlined a DUP fundraising event hosted by Paisley, while Defence Select Committee chair Julian Lewis addressed a constituency dinner hosted by DUP MP Jim Shannon. Shannon claimed Leader of the House of Commons Andrea Leadsom and Sports Minister Tracey Crouch had also attended his fundraising events in the past

In September 2018, Defence Secretary Gavin Williamson attended a DUP fundraising dinner hosted by Foster.

In October 2018, Foster and DUP MPs again hosted their annual reception at the Conservative Party conference. The following month, Chancellor of the Exchequer Philip Hammond and former Foreign Secretary Boris Johnson addressed the DUP conference.

In January 2019, former European Research Group chair Jacob Rees-Mogg spoke at a DUP fundraiser at the invitation of Paisley, after declining a similar invitation to fundraise for the Northern Ireland Conservatives.

== 2018–2019: Brexit withdrawal agreement ==
The Brexit withdrawal agreement negotiated by Theresa May's government, and the revised agreement by Boris Johnson's government were both not supported by the DUP, who voted against the legislation in the House of Commons.

== See also ==
- Conservative–Liberal Democrat coalition agreement
- Lib–Lab pact
- Lib–Con pact
- Unionist government, 1895–1905
- United Kingdom government austerity programme § Northern Ireland
- Premiership of Theresa May
