= War ministry =

In the United Kingdom, war ministry may refer to the following British wartime ministries of the 20th century:

- Lloyd George war ministry (1916–1919)
- Chamberlain war ministry (1939–1940)
- Churchill war ministry (1940–1945)

== See also ==
- United Kingdom coalition government (disambiguation)
- War cabinet
