= Timeline of Winston Churchill's first premiership =

The following is a timeline of the first premiership of Winston Churchill, who was the prime minister of the United Kingdom from 1940 to 1945 and again from 1951 to 1955. Churchill served as the prime minister of the United Kingdom during the bulk of World War II. His speeches and radio broadcasts helped inspire British resistance, especially during the difficult days of 1940–41 when the British Commonwealth and Empire stood almost alone in its active opposition to Nazi Germany. He led Britain as prime minister until victory over Nazi Germany had been secured.

After the Conservative Party lost the 1945 election, Churchill became Leader of the Opposition to the Labour Government. He would go on to be re-elected as prime minister in 1951.

== 1940 ==
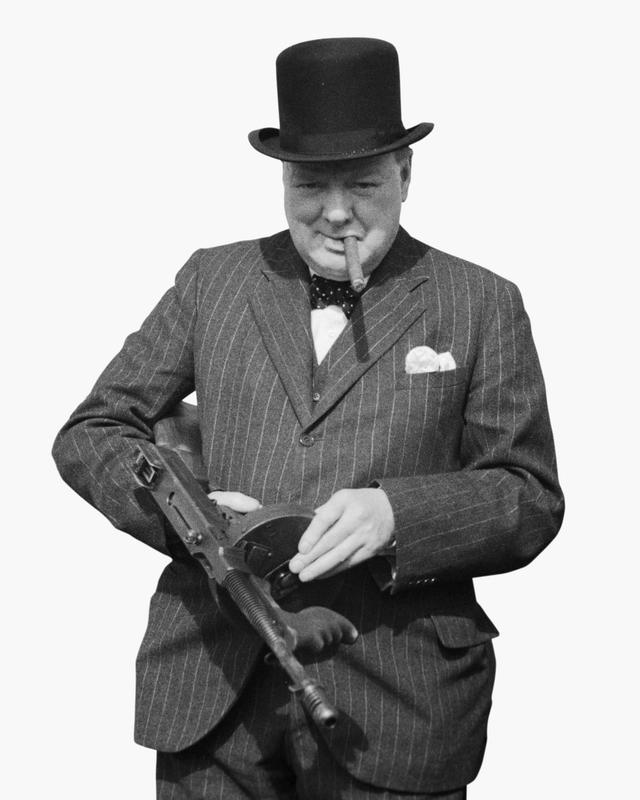
Churchill holding a Tommy Gun during an inspection of invasion defences near Hartlepool, on 21 July 1940

=== April ===
- 3 April 1940: The Ministerial Defence Committee, with the First Lord of the Admiralty (Winston Churchill) as its chair, replaces Lord Chatfield's ministerial position of Minister for Coordination of Defence.

=== May ===
- 9 May 1940: the Norway Debate in London concludes.
  Even though he won, Neville Chamberlain begins considering his position.
- 10 May 1940: Germany invades Belgium, France, Luxembourg and the Netherlands.
  The United Kingdom invades Iceland.
  Belgium declares a state of emergency.
  Following the resignation of Neville Chamberlain, Winston Churchill is summoned in the evening to become Prime Minister of the United Kingdom and form a wartime coalition government.
- 11 May 1940: Churchill offers the former Kaiser Wilhelm II, who is now living in the Netherlands, asylum in the United Kingdom; he declines.
- 13 May 1940: Dutch government-in-exile established in London.
  Queen Wilhelmina of the Netherlands flees to asylum in the United Kingdom.
  Churchill's "blood, toil, tears, and sweat" speech in Commons.
- 14 May 1940: The creation of the Local Defence Volunteers (the Home Guard) is announced by the new Secretary of State for War Anthony Eden. It is mostly composed of the elderly and retired.
  Churchill asks President Roosevelt and Canada for aid in these dark days. Outlines of the new British coalition, which includes Labour, Liberal, and Conservative members, is made public.
- 16 May 1940: Churchill visits Paris and hears that the French war is as good as over.
- 30 May 1940: Crucial British Cabinet meeting: Churchill wins a vote on continuing the war, in spite of vigorous arguments by Lord Halifax and Chamberlain.

=== June ===
- 4 June 1940: Churchill's "We shall fight on the beaches" speech to the House of Commons.
- 18 June 1940: Churchill gives his famous "finest hour" speech to the House of Commons.

=== August ===
- 20 August 1940: Italy announces a blockade of British ports in the Mediterranean area.
- 20 August 1940: Churchill's speech "Never was so much owed by so many to so few" delivered to the House of Commons.
- 25 August 1940: Churchill orders the bombing of Berlin in retaliation for the previous night's bombing of Cripplegate.

=== October ===
- 9 October 1940: Neville Chamberlain resigns from the House of Commons for health reasons; Winston Churchill is elected head of the Conservative Party.

=== November ===
- 16 November 1940: Churchill orders some British troops in North Africa to be sent to Greece, despite concerns by his military.

== 1941 ==
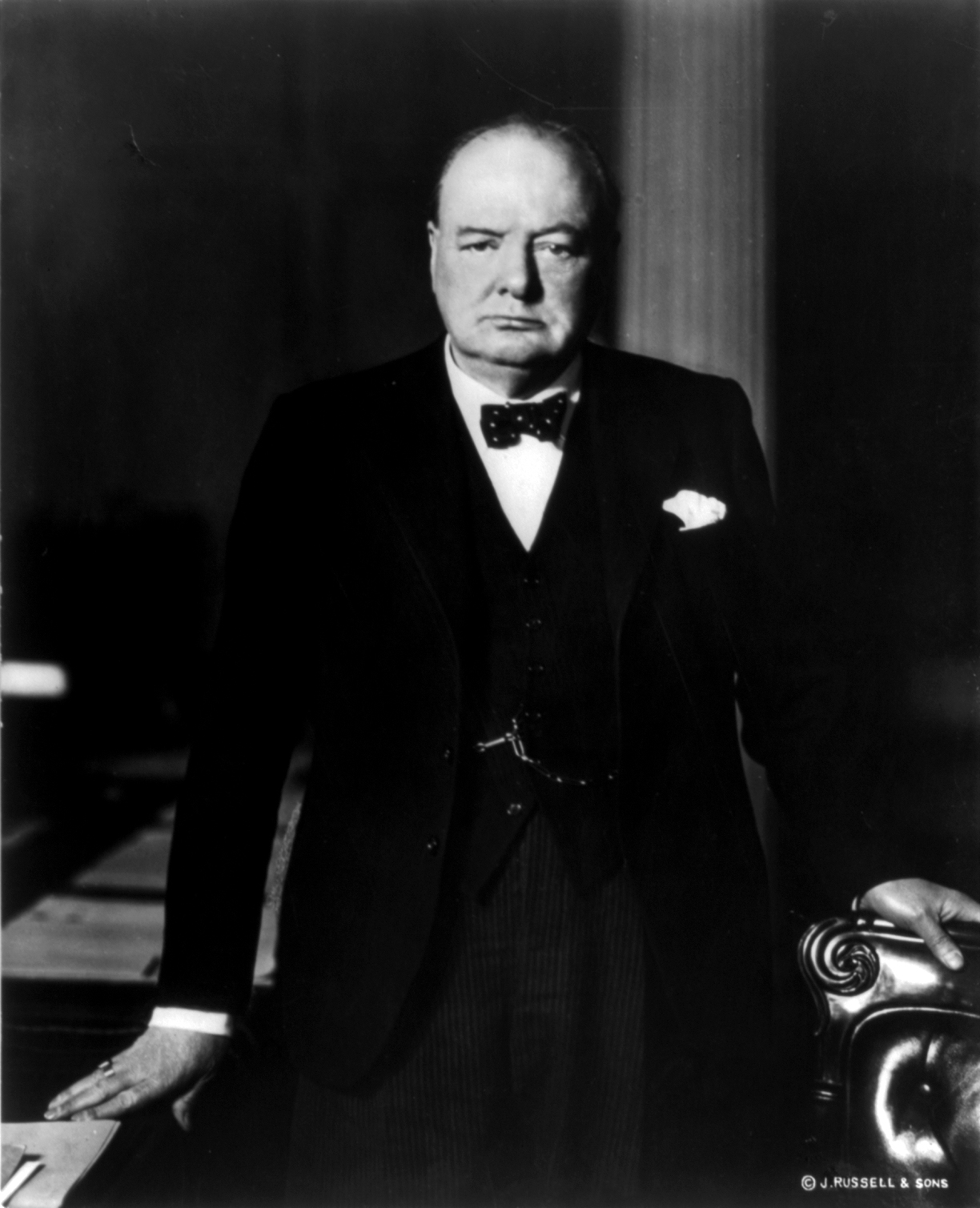
Churchill (1941)

=== February ===
- 9 February 1941: British forces reach El Agheila, Cyrenaica. British battleships shell Genoa and British aircraft attack Livorno. Churchill again pleads with the US: "give us the tools."

=== April ===
- 23 April 1941: Greek government is evacuated to Crete, which Churchill is determined to defend.

=== June ===
- 1 June 1941: The evacuation of Allied forces from Crete ends; over 17,000 are captured by German forces.
- 22 June 1941: Germany invasion of Russia begins, as Operation Barbarossa.

=== July ===
- 19 July 1941: The "V-sign", displayed most notably by Churchill, is unofficially adopted as the Allied signal, along with the motif of Beethoven's Fifth Symphony.

=== August ===
- 9 August 1941: Franklin D. Roosevelt and Winston Churchill meet at NS Argentia, Newfoundland. The Atlantic Charter is written and released to the world press.

=== December ===
- 7 December 1941: Japan attacks the US Navy base of Pearl Harbor in Hawaii. Churchill was with the President's special envoy, Averell Harriman, and the US Ambassador to Britain, John Gilbert Winant, when he received the news over the telephone from President Roosevelt.
- 8 December 1941: With the hope of using Irish ports for counter submarine operations, Churchill sends a telegram to the Irish Prime Minister in which he obliquely offers Irish unity: "Now is your chance. Now or never! A nation once again! I will meet you wherever you wish." No meeting took place between the two prime ministers and there is no record of a response from the Irish Prime Minister Éamon de Valera.
- 8 December 1941: Japan attacks Hong Kong, Malaya and the Philippines in a simultaneous attack with Pearl Harbor but is counted a day later due to the International Date Line.
- 26 December 1941: Churchill makes his first address to a joint session of the United States Congress.
- 26 December 1941: The evening after speaking to Congress, Churchill suffers a mild heart attack.

== 1942 ==
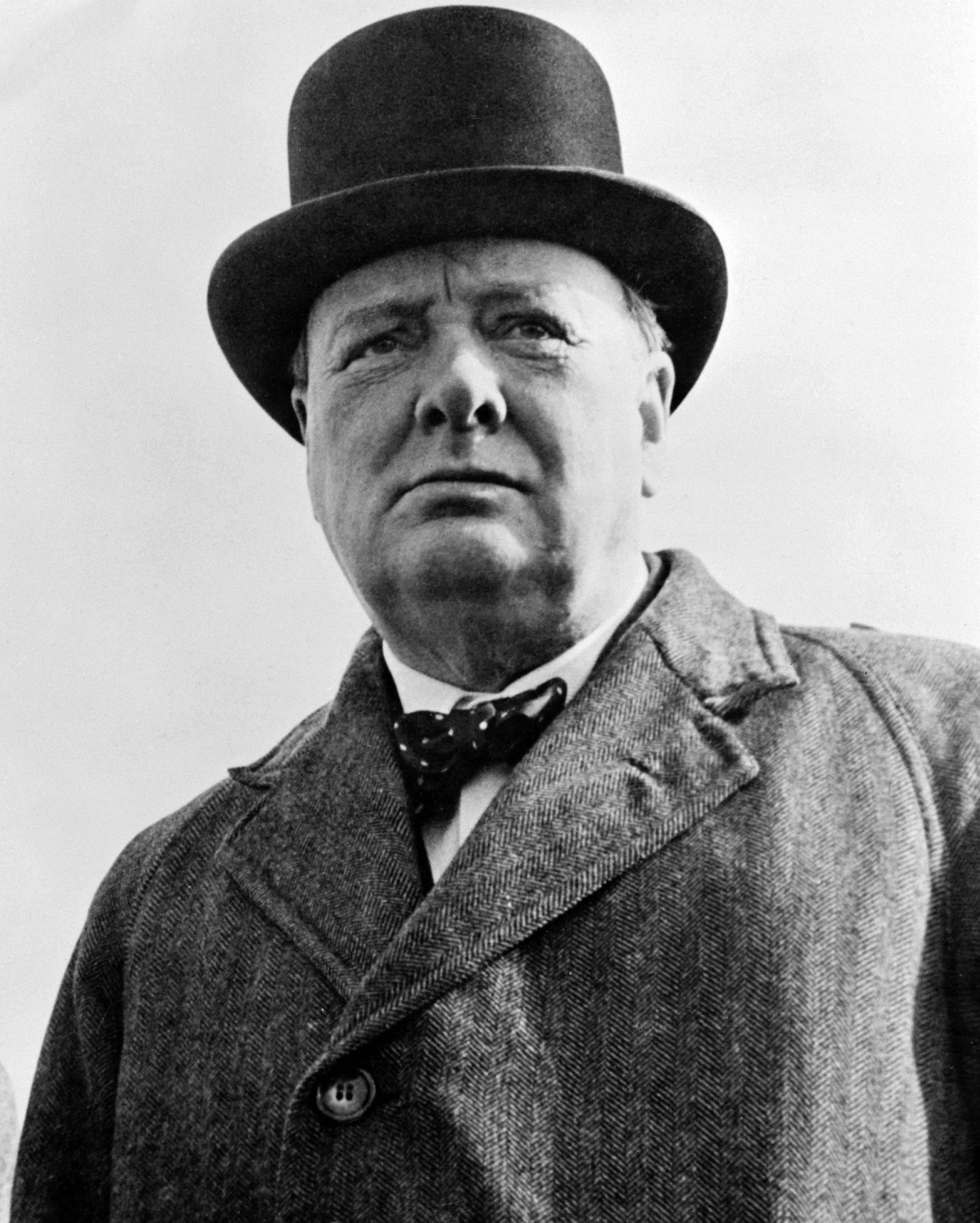
Churchill (1942)

=== February ===
- 15 February 1942: The Commonwealth forces at Singapore surrender to the Japanese.

=== April ===
- 14 April 1942: Churchill, concerned that the situation in Malta will cause the Axis forces in North Africa to be better supplied than British forces, sends a telegram to Sir Stafford Cripps in Cairo, asking him to pressure General Auchinleck to take offensive action before this can occur.
- 20 April 1942: General Dobbie, Governor-General and Commander-in-Chief of Malta, sends a message to the PM saying "it is obvious that the very worst may happen if we cannot replenish our vital needs, especially flour and ammunition, and that very soon...." Churchill concludes from this and other "disturbing news" that Dobbie is not capable enough for such an important job, and decides to replace him with Lord Gort.

=== May ===
- 9 May 1942: On the night of 8–9 May 1942, gunners of the Ceylon Garrison Artillery on Horsburgh Island in the Cocos Islands rebelled. Their mutiny was crushed and three of them were executed, the only British Commonwealth soldiers to be executed for mutiny during the Second World War.
  USS Wasp and HMS Eagle deliver a second contingent of Spitfires to Malta in Operation Bowery. A few days later, a grateful Churchill will signal Wasp "Who says a Wasp can't sting twice?" These aircraft, employed more aggressively than those previously delivered, turn the tide in the skies over Malta during the next few days, and the Axis is forced to abandon daylight bombing. This is a major turning point in the Siege, and thus in the North African Campaign, although the approaches to the island remain subject to deadly and accurate Axis air attack, preventing efficient re-supply of the island.
- 10 May 1942: 10: Churchill, growing ever more frustrated with General Auchinleck's inactivity, finally sends him a telegram with a clear order; attack in time to cover for the Harpoon/Vigorous convoys to Malta during the dark of the moon in early June. This places Auchinleck in the position of complying or resigning. Auchinleck does not immediately reply, leaving Churchill, CIGS, and the War Cabinet in a state of suspense.
- 17 May 1942: It has been a week since Churchill sent his ultimatum to General Auchinleck, and he has not yet received a reply. He sends a terse follow-up: "It is necessary for me to have some account of your general intentions in light of our recent telegrams." Again there is no immediate reply.
- 19 May 1942: General Auchinleck at last replies to Churchill's somewhat urgent telegram of the 10th, saying he will have an attack ready by the sailing of the Harpoon/Vigorous convoys for Malta.
- 21 May 1942: In discussions with Churchill and Anthony Eden, Molotov continues to press Soviet demands for territorial acquisitions made during the run-up to war, including the Baltic states, Eastern Poland, and Bessarabia. Churchill cannot or will not agree to these demands, and the talks become deadlocked.

=== June ===
- 14 June 1942: At the Gazala Line, the British position has become untenable, and General Auchinleck authorizes General Ritchie to make a concerted withdrawal from forward positions along the line.
  1st South African Division is able to withdraw along the coastal road, but the road cannot accommodate all the troops at once, and this route in any event is under threat of being cut by Rommel's forces; so troops including 50th Division must first breakout to the southwest, through the area occupied by Italian X Corps, and then turn east to rejoin 8th Army. This somewhat daring operation is concluded successfully. The RAF forces available, although outnumbered, make a valiant effort to cover the retreat. Churchill sends Auchinleck a telegram beginning, 'To what position does Ritchie want to withdraw the Gazala troops? Presume there is no question in any case of giving up Tobruk.'
  The convoy 'Vigorous', en route to Malta, sights a large Italian naval squadron headed toward it. 'Harpoon' comes under attack for the first time; 'Vigorous' has been under air attack almost since leaving port.
- 15 June 1942: General Auchinleck sends Churchill a reply to the latter's telegram of the 14th, saying in part, "...I have no intention whatever of giving up Tobruk."
- 16 June 1942: Churchill, about to leave for America, takes the unusual step of sending a letter to HRM George VI, advising him to make Anthony Eden Prime Minister should Churchill not survive the journey.
- 18 June 1942: Winston Churchill arrives in Washington for meetings with Roosevelt.

=== July ===
- 2 July 1942: Churchill survives a censure motion in the House of Commons.

=== August ===
- 12 August 1942: At a conference in Moscow, Churchill informs Stalin that there will not be a "second front" in 1942.
- 13 August 1942: General Bernard Montgomery appointed commander of British Eighth Army in North Africa; Churchill is anxious to see more offensive action on the part of the British.

=== November ===
- 10 November 1942: Montgomery begins a major British offensive beginning at Sollum on the Libya/Egypt border. The British reach Bardia on the 11th, Tobruk on the 12th, and Benghazi on the 18th.
  Lieutenant General Montgomery is knighted and made a full General. Churchill speaks: "This is not the end. It is not even the beginning of the end. But it is, perhaps, the end of the beginning."

=== December ===
- 17 December 1942: From the floor of the House of Commons, Foreign Secretary Anthony Eden reads what is known as the Joint Declaration by Members of the United Nations, in which the Allies denounce the German extermination of Jews. A copy of the declaration appears on the front pages of newspapers around the world.

== 1943 ==
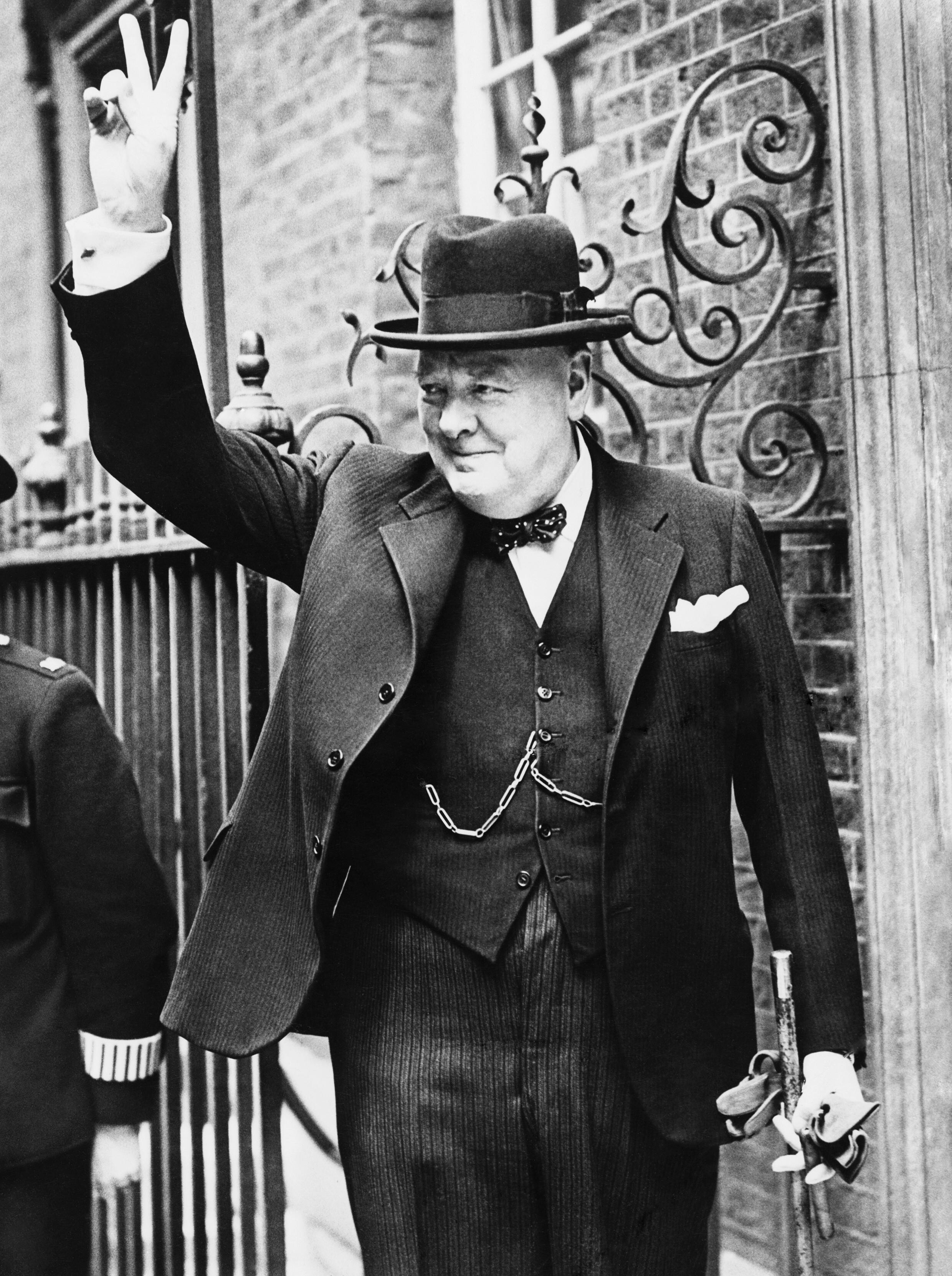
Churchill (1943)

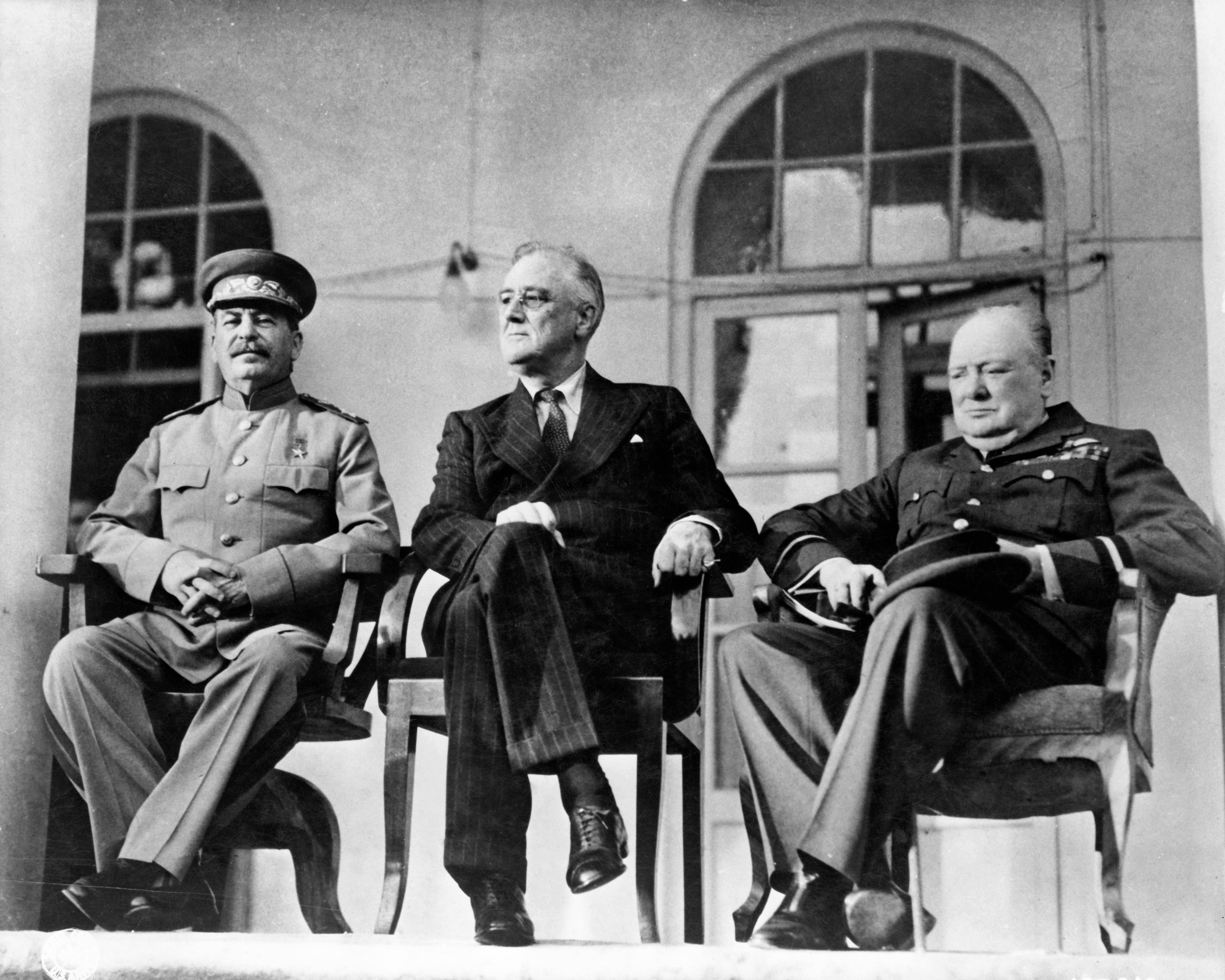
Tehran Conference (1943). Left to right: Joseph Stalin, Franklin D. Roosevelt of the United States, and Churchill

=== January ===
- 14 January 1943: The Casablanca Conference of Allied leaders begins. Churchill and Franklin D. Roosevelt discuss the eventual invasion of mainland Europe, the impending invasion of Sicily and Italy, and the wisdom of the principle of "unconditional surrender".

=== May ===
- 12 May 1943: The Trident Conference begins in Washington, D.C., with Franklin D. Roosevelt and Winston Churchill taking part. The discussions are mostly on future strategy.
- 19 May 1943: Churchill addresses a joint session of the U.S. Congress. He praises the partnership of the two Allies.

=== July ===
- 25 July 1943: Benito Mussolini is removed from office; it leads to the formation of a new government in Italy.

=== August ===
- 19 August 1943: Roosevelt and Churchill signed the Quebec Agreement during the Quebec Conference.

=== October ===
- 3 October 1943: Churchill appoints Lord Louis Mountbatten the commander of South East Asia Command.

=== November ===
- 16 November 1943: 160 American bombers strike a hydro-electric power facility and heavy water factory in German-controlled Vemork, Norway.
- 22 November 1943: The Cairo Conference: US President Franklin D. Roosevelt, British Prime Minister Winston Churchill, and ROC leader Chiang Kai-shek meet in Cairo, Egypt, to discuss ways to defeat Japan.
- 27 November 1943: The Cairo Conference ("Sextant") ends; Roosevelt, Churchill, and Chiang Kai-shek complete the Cairo Declaration, which deals with the overall strategic plan against Japan.
- 28 November 1943: The Tehran Conference. US President Franklin D. Roosevelt, British Prime Minister Winston Churchill and Soviet Leader Joseph Stalin meet in Tehran to discuss war strategy; (on 30 November they establish an agreement concerning a planned June 1944 invasion of Europe codenamed Operation Overlord). Stalin at last has the promise he has been waiting for.

== 1944 ==
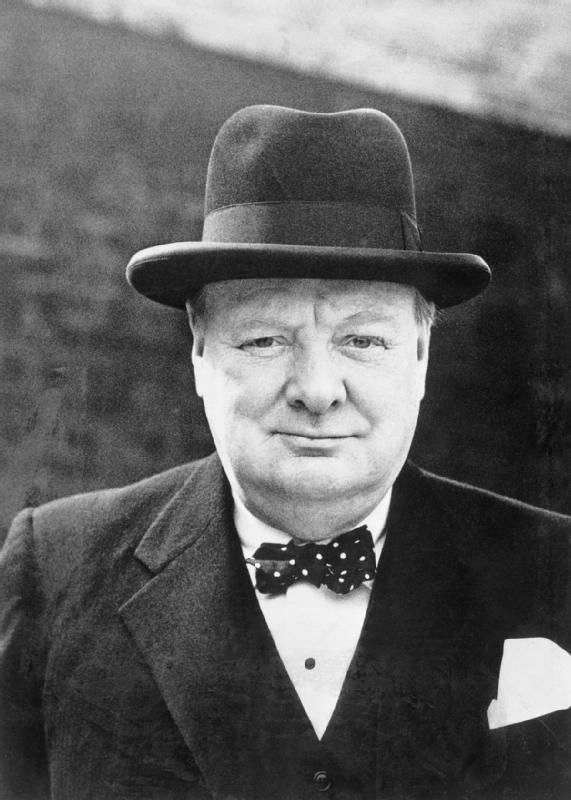
Churchill (1944)

=== February ===
- 10 February 1944: Churchill urges Harold Alexander to order the Anzio generals to show more aggression.

=== June ===
- 6 June 1944: British and US troops land at Normandy in France, initiating a Second Front against Germany. Codenamed Operation Overlord, the day is also known as D-Day.

=== August ===
- 20 August 1944: Allied troops reach Paris.

=== September ===
- 12 September 1944: The Second Quebec Conference (codenamed "Octagon") begins: Roosevelt and Churchill discuss military cooperation in the Pacific and the future of Germany.

=== October ===
- 9 October 1944: The Moscow Conference (1944) begins: Churchill and Stalin discuss spheres of influence in the postwar Balkans and make the percentages agreement.

=== December ===
- 3 December 1944: The British army and the police shot unarmed protesters in Athens. The crowd carried Greek, American, British and Soviet flags, and chanted: "Viva Churchill, Viva Roosevelt, Viva Stalin."
- 16 December 1944: Battle of the Bulge begins.
- 28 December 1944: Churchill and his Foreign Secretary Anthony Eden are in Athens in an attempt to reconcile the warring factions.

== 1945 ==
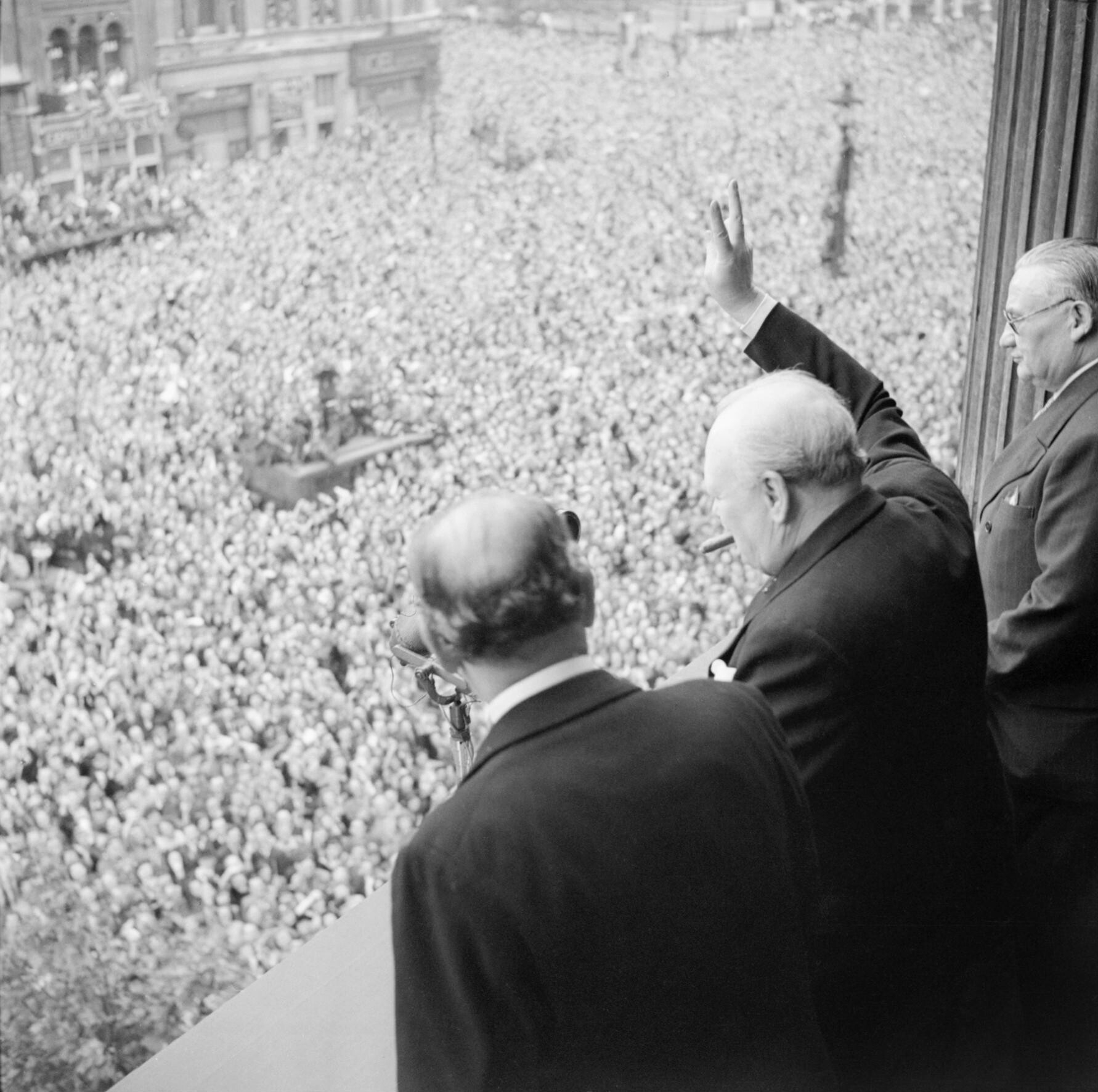
Churchill waves to crowds in Whitehall on the day he broadcast to the nation that the war with Germany had been won, 8 May 1945

=== February ===
- 4 February 1945: The Yalta Conference of Roosevelt, Churchill and Joseph Stalin begins; the main subject of their discussions is postwar spheres of influence.

=== April ===
- 12 April 1945: US President Franklin D. Roosevelt dies, and is succeeded by Vice President Harry S. Truman.
- 16 April 1945: The Soviets overtake Berlin.
- 30 April 1945: Hitler commits suicide, is succeeded by Karl Dönitz.

=== May ===
- 7 May 1945: Germany surrenders to the western Allies.
- 23 May 1945: Wartime coalition ends. Start of brief caretaker government.

=== June ===
- 5 June 1945: The longest parliament of the 20th century is dissolved.

=== July ===
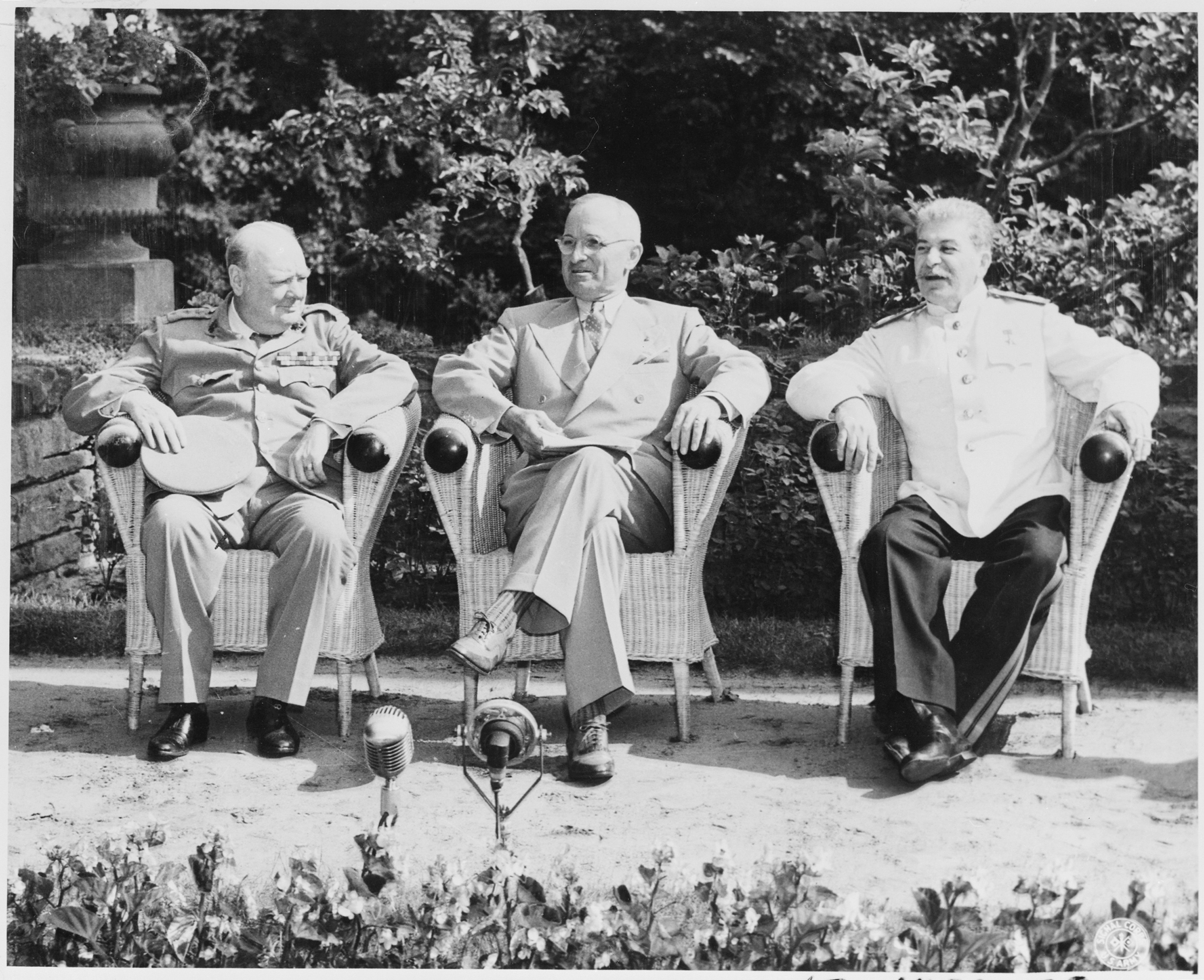
At the end: Winston Churchill, Harry S. Truman, and Joseph Stalin

- 17 July 1945: The Potsdam Conference begins under Churchill (later replaced by Attlee), Stalin and Truman. The Allied leaders agree to insist upon the unconditional surrender of Japan, which takes place on 9 August 1945.
- 26 July 1945: The Labour Party win the general election by a landslide. Churchill resigns as Prime Minister, ending his first premiership.

== See also ==
- British Empire in World War II
- Military history of the United Kingdom during World War II
- List of Allied World War II conferences
