= Timeline of the United Kingdom home front during World War II =

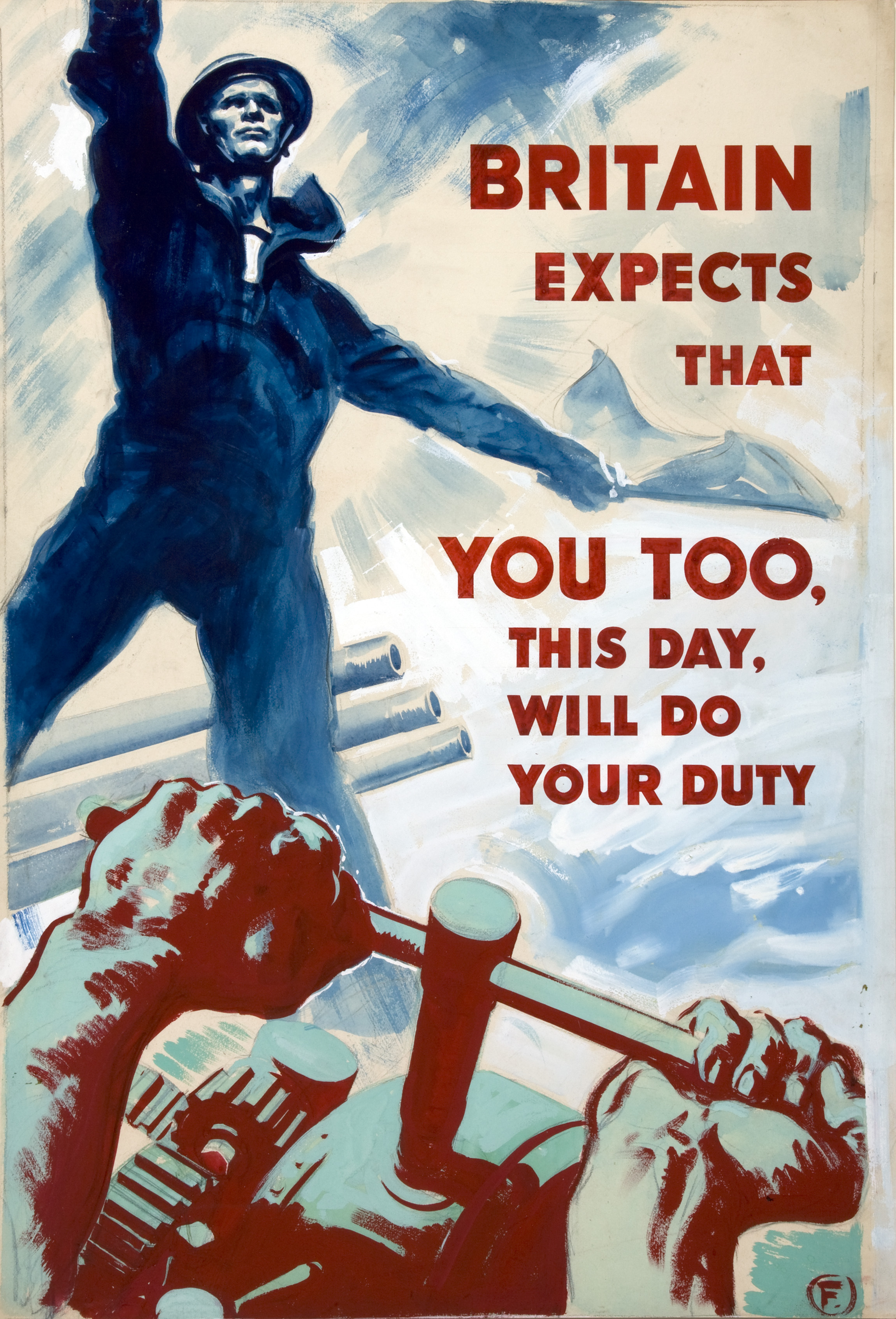
One of a series of Ministry of Information propaganda posters, comparing industrial workers to members of the armed forces. This one paraphrases Lord Nelson's famous signal; "England expects that every man will do his duty".

This is a Timeline of the United Kingdom home front during World War II covering Britain 1939–45.

For a narrative history and bibliography of the home front see British home front during World War II, as well as history of Scotland § Second World War 1939–45 and history of Northern Ireland § Second World War. For the military story see military history of the United Kingdom during World War II for foreign affairs, diplomatic history of World War II. For the government see Timeline of Winston Churchill's first premiership.

== 1939 ==
3 June 1939

The Military Training Act, Britain's first peacetime draft, comes into force. All men aged 20–21 are now liable to call-up for four years military service as 'Militiamen'.

24 August 1939

Given the worsening situation in Europe, Parliament is recalled and immediately enacts the Emergency Powers (Defence) Act 1939, granting the government special legislative powers for the duration of the crisis.
Army reservists are called up.
Civil Defence workers are put on alert.

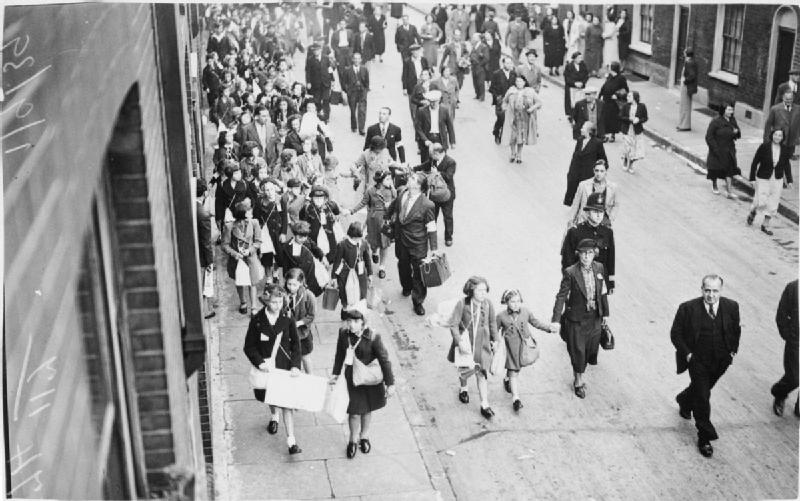
Evacuee schoolchildren leave Stepney in London at 5 am on 1 September 1939.

25 August 1939

The National Defence Companies (a voluntary reserve force of former servicemen) are mobilised to protect "vulnerable points".

30 August 1939

The Fleet proceeds to its war stations. The Royal Navy is much stronger than Germany's Kriegsmarine. It has twelve battleships versus zero for Germany; seven aircraft carriers versus zero; three battle cruisers versus five; 66 cruisers versus six; 100 destroyers versus 17, 67 submarines versus 57; and a merchant fleet five times larger.

1 September 1939

In response to the German invasion of Poland and the prospect of war with Germany, plans for the evacuation of children and nursing and expectant mothers from London and other areas deemed vulnerable to German air attack are put into action.
The Blackout begins.
The British Army is officially mobilized.
Government initiates 'Operation Pied Piper' which would see the evacuation of over 1.5 million people from urban 'target' areas, of whom 800,000 were children.

2 September 1939

Under intense criticism from the House, Neville Chamberlain abandons an offer to negotiate peace terms between Germany and Poland and agrees to present an ultimatum to Hitler.

3 September 1939

Shortly after 11:00 Chamberlain announces to the nation that his ultimatum has expired and that Britain is at war with Germany.
Twenty minutes later the first air raid sirens are sounded in London. They are a false alarm.
Chamberlain reforms his Government, creating a small War cabinet which includes Winston Churchill as First Lord of the Admiralty.
The National Service (Armed Forces) Act is passed. All men aged 18–41 are now potentially liable for conscription.

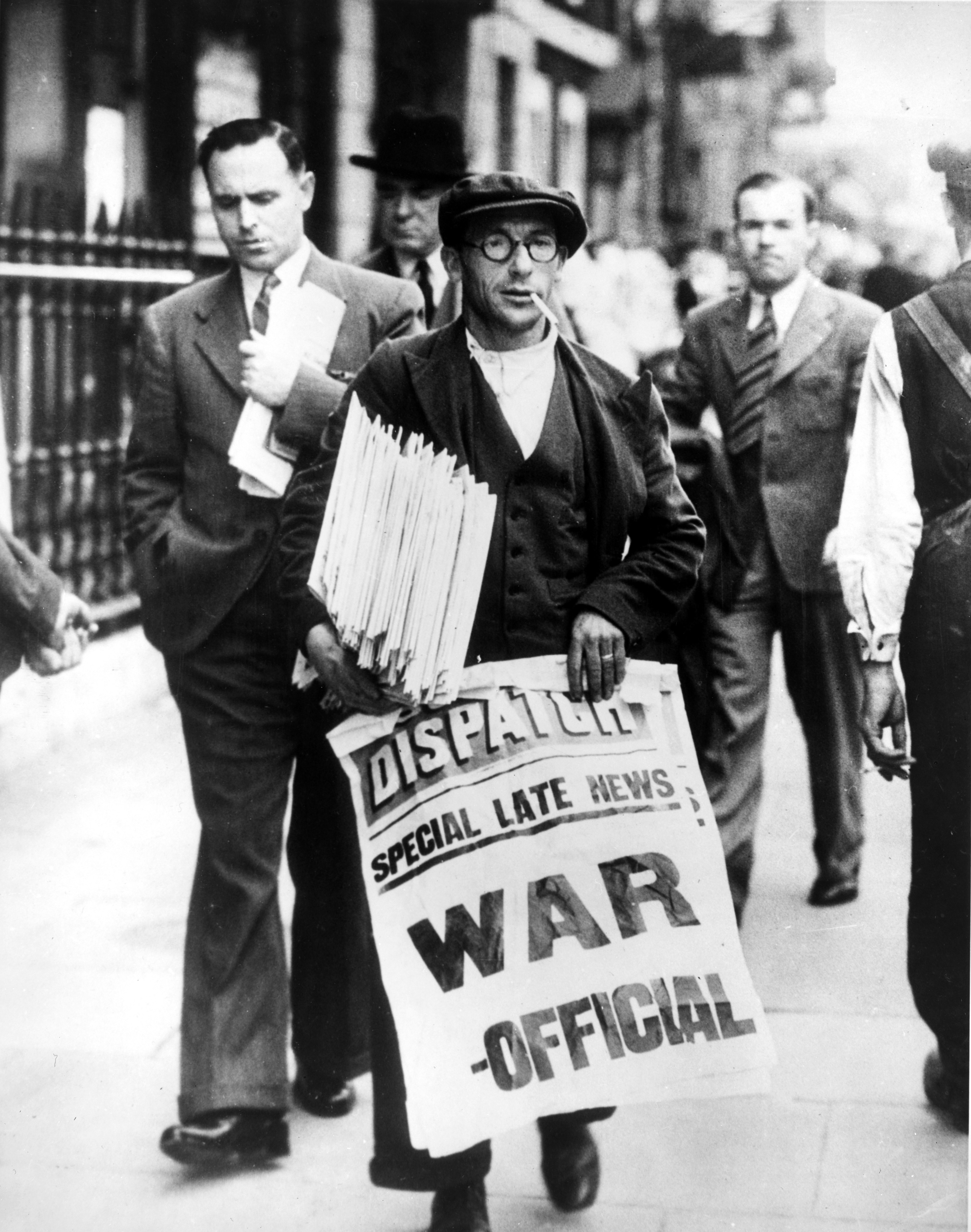
Newspaper vendor holding stack of newspapers and sign announcing the state of war

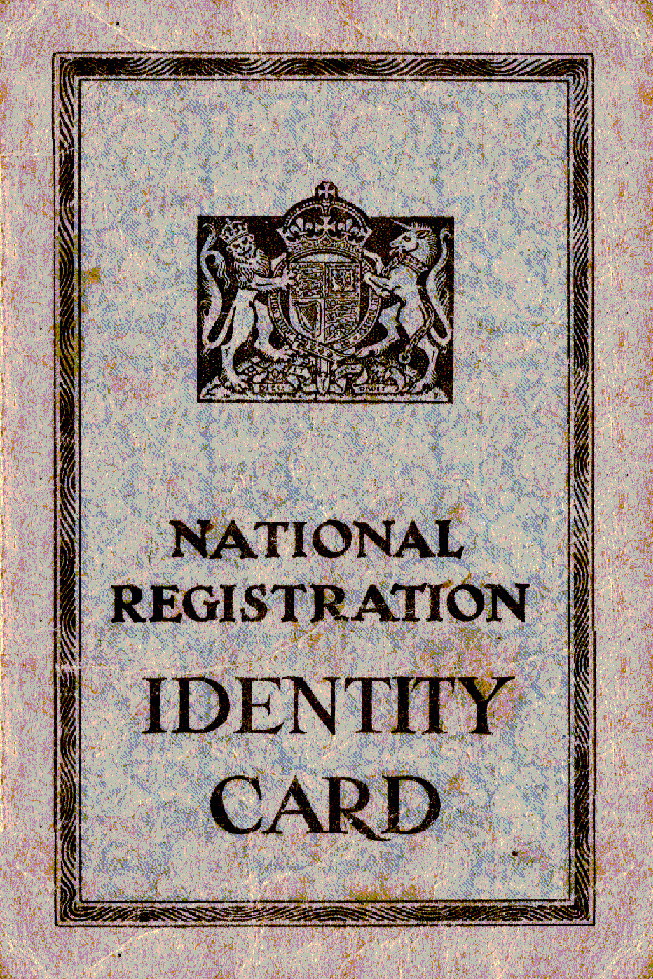
Identity Card – 1943

7 September 1939

The National Registration Act is passed, introducing identity cards.

23 September 1939

Petrol rationing introduced.

27 September 1939

The first war tax is revealed by the Cabinet, including a significant increase in income taxes.

1 October 1939

Call-Up Proclamation: all men aged 20–21 who have not already done so must apply for registration with the military authorities.

6 October 1939

With the end of formal Polish resistance the Phoney War begins; It lasts until April 1940. There was little military action, although the Allies (Britain and France) began economic warfare, and shut down the German surface raiders. They created elaborate plans for numerous large-scale operations designed to swiftly and decisively cripple the German war effort. These included opening a French-British front in the Balkans; invading Norway to seize control of the Germany's main source of iron ore; and a strike against the Soviet Union, to cut off its supply of oil to Germany. Only the Norway plan came to fruition, and it was too little too late in April 1940.

November 1939

London schools start to reopen because of evacuee children returning to the capital.

== 1940 ==
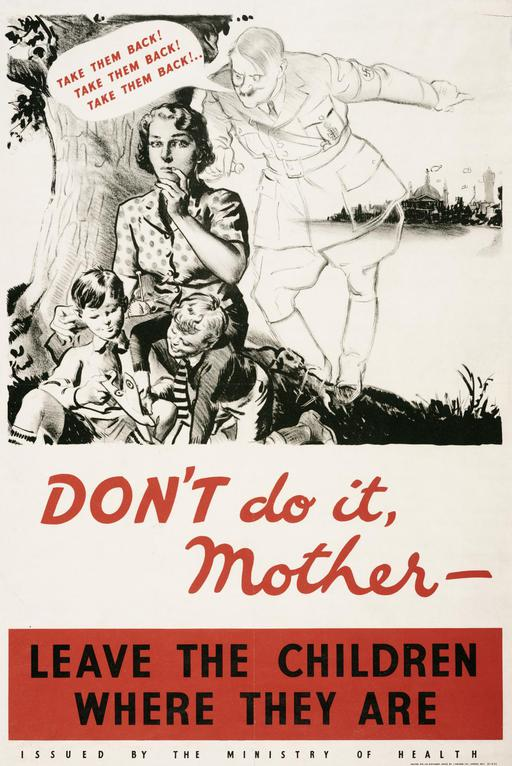
A government poster urging mothers not to bring their evacuated children back to vulnerable urban areas.

January 1940

35% of London schoolchildren had returned from evacuation.

8 January 1940

First food rationing introduced.

May to June 1940

Further evacuation of 160,000 children from London and relocation of children who had been settled near vulnerable coastal areas.
Winston Churchill gives a series of famous speeches in Parliament: "Blood, toil, tears and sweat", "We shall fight on the beaches" and "This was their finest hour."

7 May 1940

The debate on the recent military failure in Norway leads (on 10 May) to Chamberlain's resignation.

10 May 1940

Germany invades France and the Low Countries, ending the Phoney War.
Winston Churchill becomes Prime Minister and forms an all-party coalition government.

12 May 1940

Internment of all German or Austrian males aged between 16 and 60 begins, starting with those living nearest to the south and east coasts.

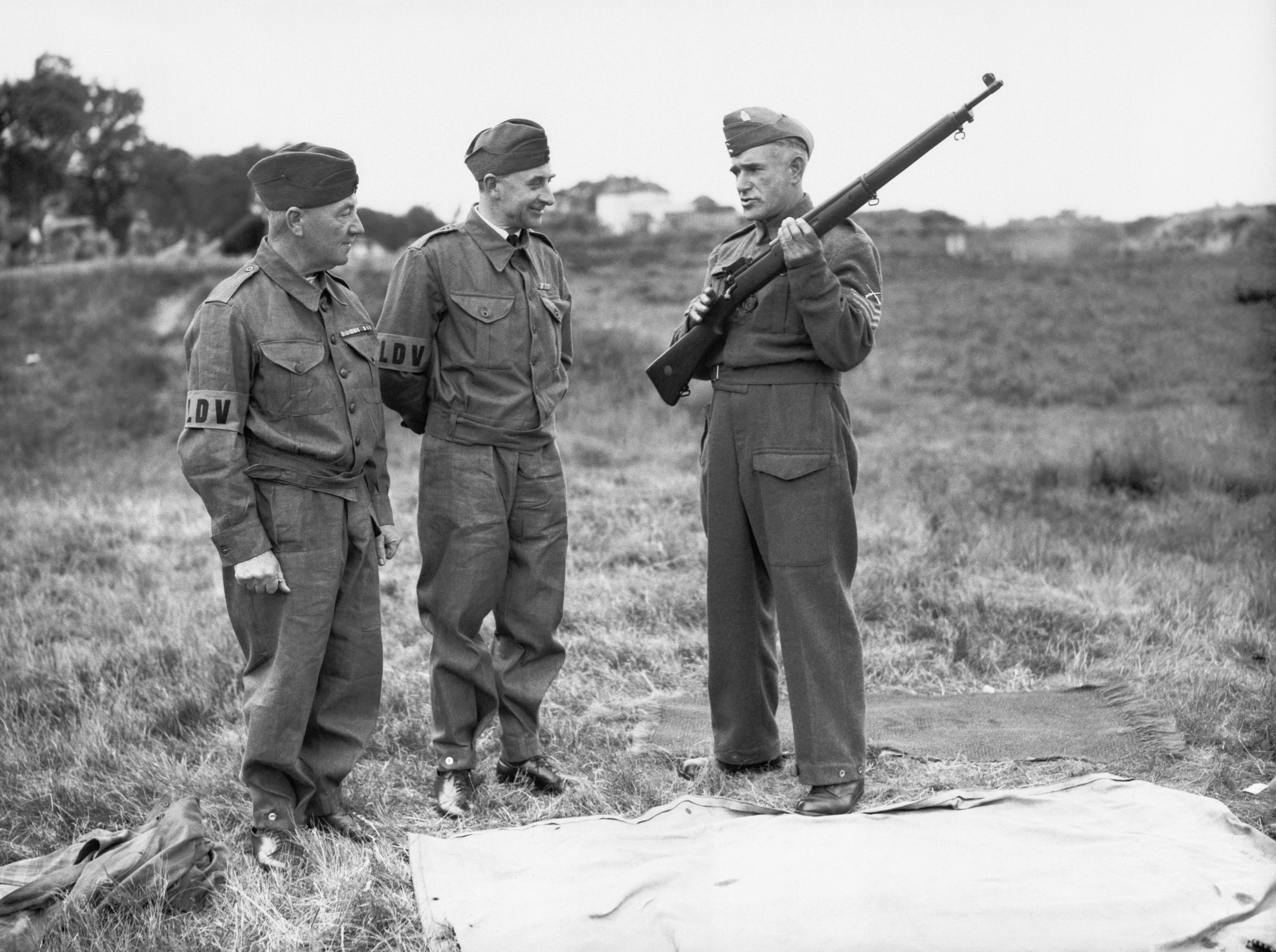
Local Defence Volunteers receive rifle instruction, Surrey 1940.

14 May 1940

In a BBC radio broadcast Anthony Eden calls for the creation of the Local Defence Volunteers (LDV) militia – renamed on 23 July the Home Guard.

22 May 1940

The Emergency Powers (Defence) Act 1940 is passed, granting the government even more authority to control persons and property for the duration of the war.

10 June 1940

Italy declares war on Britain.
Italian men aged 17 to 60 are arrested and interned.
Large mobs attack Italian businesses and families in London, Liverpool, Belfast, Cardiff, Edinburgh and Glasgow.

19 – 28 June 1940

25,000 Channel Island refugees arrive in England.

30 June 1940

German occupation of the Channel Islands begins.

July 1940

A further 60,000 schoolchildren evacuated from London and the Home counties in the following 12 months.

3 July 1940

Cardiff is bombed for the first time.

6 July 1940

Plymouth is bombed for the first time.

9 July 1940

Official start date of the Battle of Britain.

10 July 1940

Introduction of Defence Regulation 58AA allowing the Minister of Labour to ban strike action and force compulsory arbitration. No strikes are called by any trade union during the war; there are unofficial short local strikes in coal, shipbuilding and machinery.

21 July 1940

SS Anselm leaves Liverpool for Halifax, Nova Scotia with the first group of 82 children being evacuated under the Children's Overseas Reception Board (CORB) scheme.

25 August 1940

First major air raid on central Birmingham.

28 August 1940

First major air raid on Liverpool.

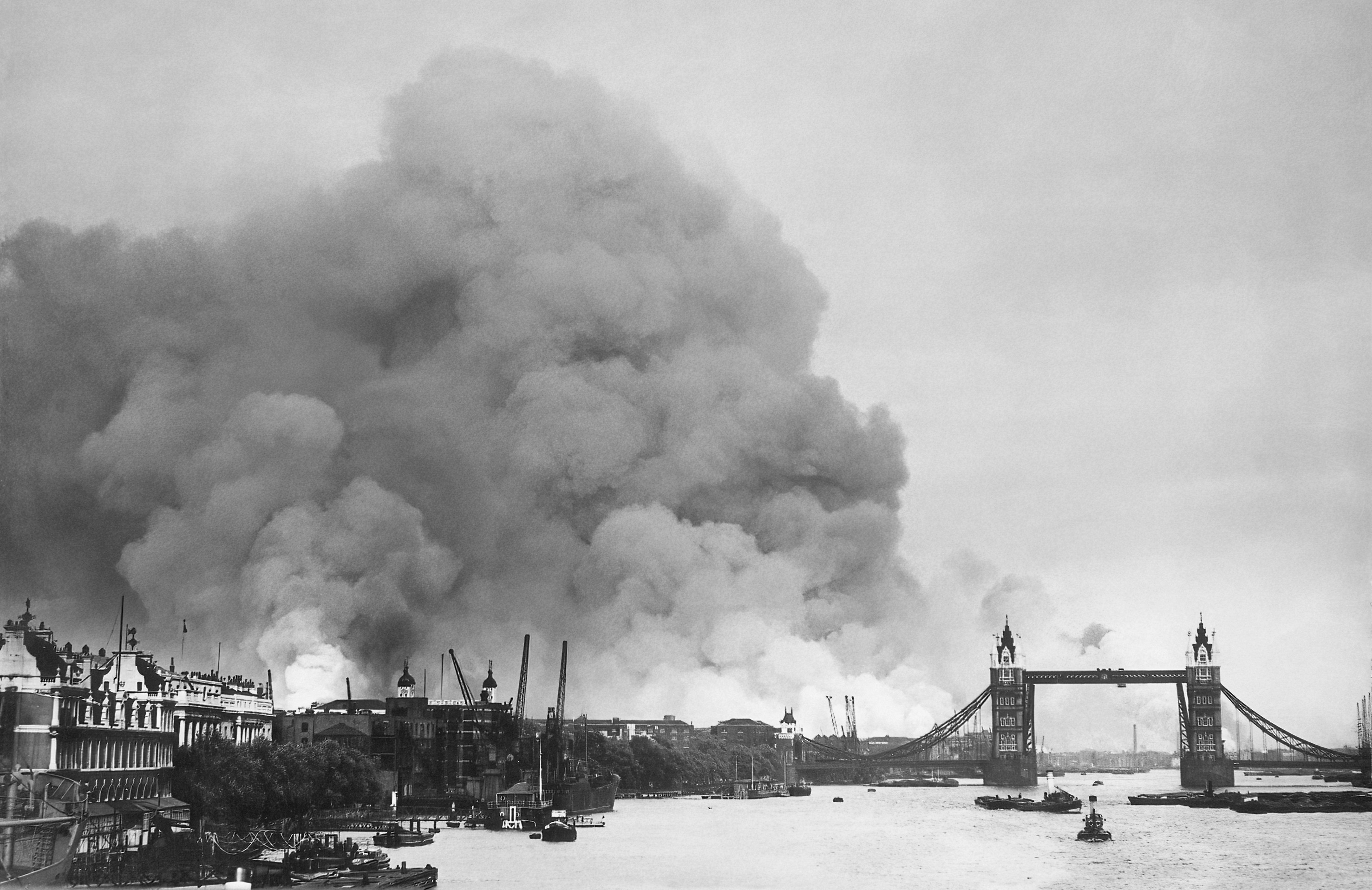
Looking down the River Thames towards the London Docks, 7 September 1940.

August–October 1940

The German Blitz hits London and other major cities causing death and damage. Official histories concluded that the mental health of a nation may have improved, while panic was a rarity. Prewar dire predictions of mass air-raid neurosis were not borne out. Predictions had underestimated the adaptability and resourcefulness; in addition there were many new civil defense roles that gave a sense of fighting back rather than despair. The highly visible dangerous role gave firemen some of the ideal attributes more commonly associated with the venerated image of the military hero.

7 September 1940

German bombing raid on South London; formal beginning of London Blitz.

18 September 1940

SS City of Benares bound for Canada is torpedoed and sunk in the Atlantic; 77 of the 90 evacuee children on board died, resulting in the abandonment of the Children's Overseas Reception Board (CORB) evacuation scheme.

31 October 1940

Official end date of the Battle of Britain.

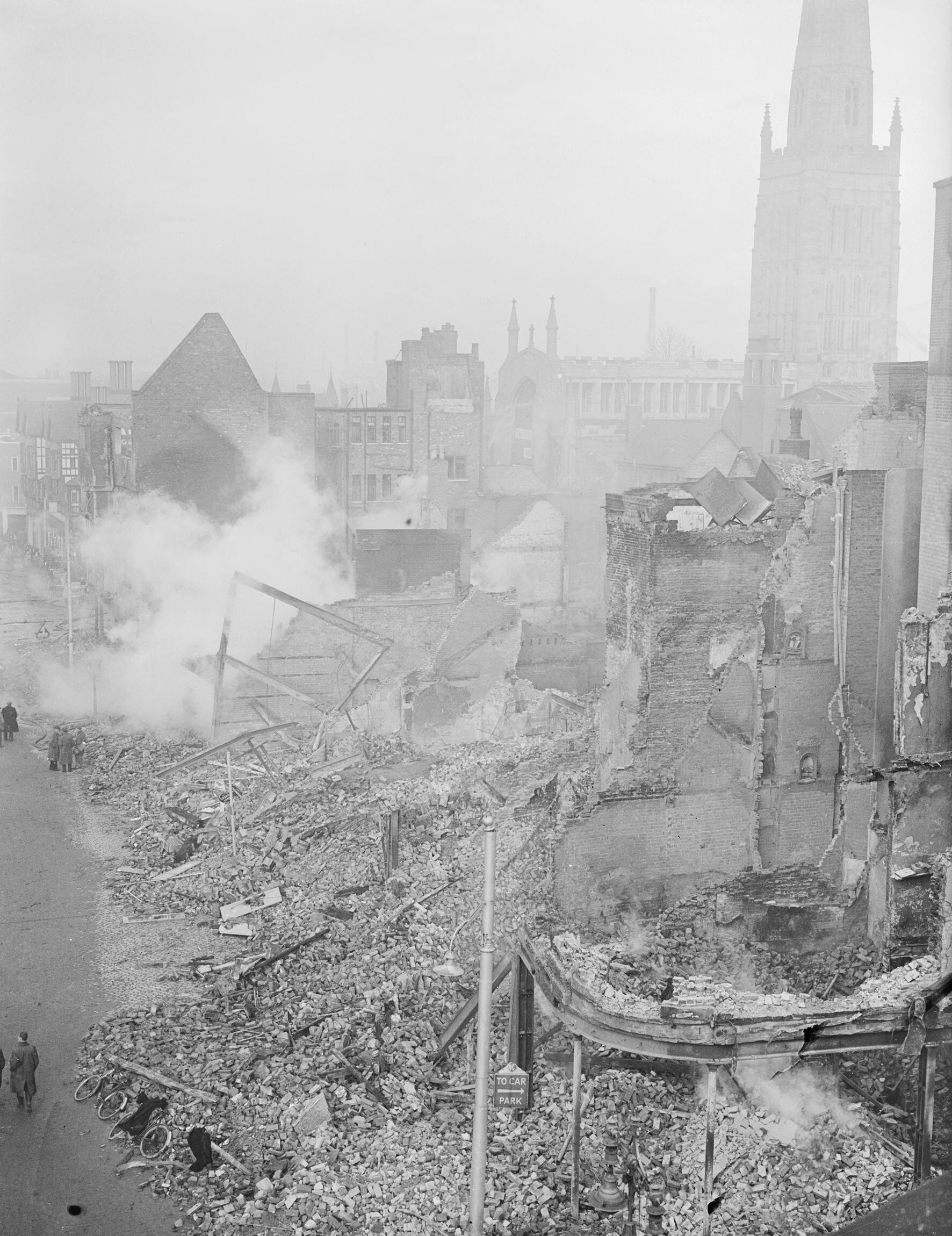
Coventry Cathedral and the city centre in ruins, 16 November 1940.

14 November 1940

Massive German bombing raid on Coventry.

12 December 1940

Major raid on Sheffield.

24 November 1940

First major air raid on Bristol.

20 December 1940

Major raid on Liverpool.

22 December 1940

First major raid on Manchester.

== 1941 ==
21 January 1941

The Communist Daily Worker newspaper is banned. It had ignored a July 1940 warning that its pacifist line contravened Defence Regulation 2D, which made it an offence to 'systematically to publish matter calculated to foment opposition to the prosecution of the war'. When Germany invaded the Soviet Union in June 1941, the British Communists became fervent supporters of the war and the ban was lifted.

13 and 14 March 1941

Major air raids destroy most of Clydebank.

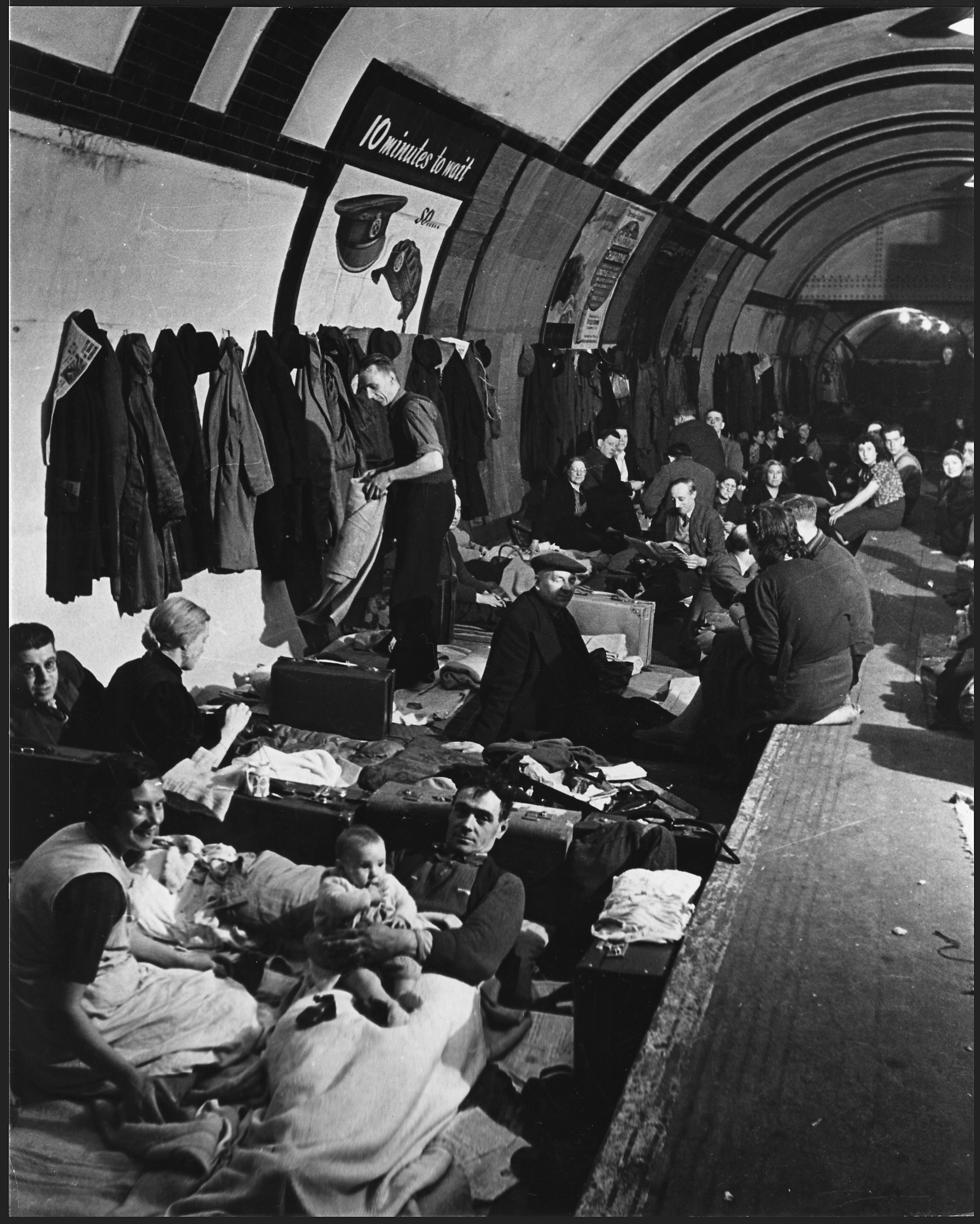
Londoners shelter from an air raid in an Underground station.

20 April 1941

34 firefighters killed in the 1941 Old Palace School bombing, the largest single loss of Fire Brigade personnel in English history.

10 May 1941

Last major attack on London of the 1940-41 Blitz.

27 May 1941

The German battleship Bismarck is sunk after hours of cannon duels and biplane torpedo attacks.

1 June 1941

Civilian clothing is rationed for the first time.

18 December 1941

The National Service (No. 2) Act is passed. All men 18-60 and unmarried women and childless widows aged 20-30 are now liable to some form of national service, including military service for those under 51. The first military registration of 18.5-year-olds takes place. The Schedule of Reserved Occupations is abandoned: from now on only individual deferments from the draft will be accepted.

== 1942 ==
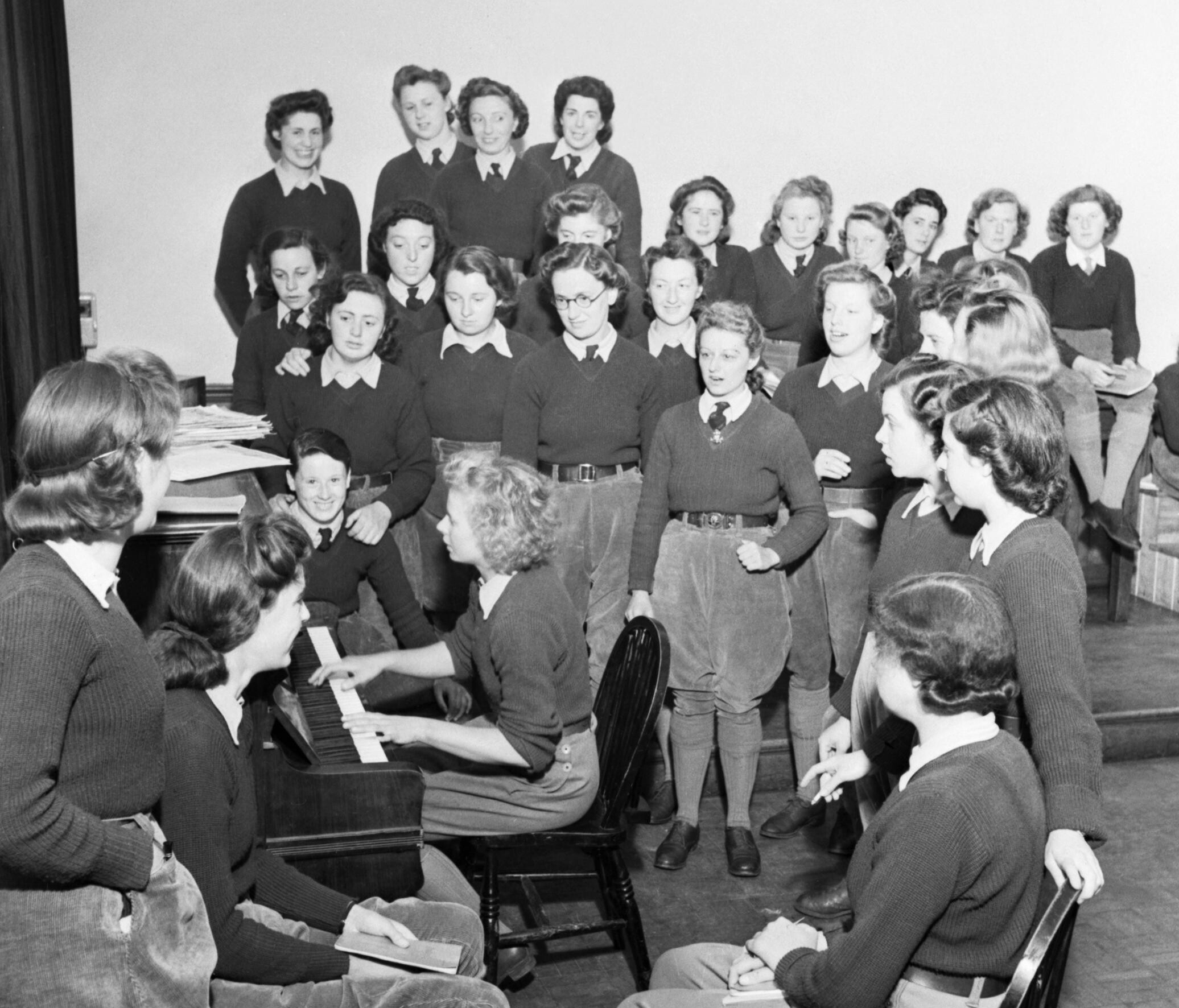
Members of the Women's Land Army in 1942

23 January 1942

First US Army troops arrive in the UK. Disembarking at Belfast, the officers were the advanced party of a force intended to defend Northern Ireland and release British troops for service overseas.

5 March 1942

The Daily Mirror publishes a controversial cartoon by Philip Zec which Churchill and other senior government figures alleged was damaging to public morale. Zec is investigated by MI5 and the government seriously proposes banning the newspaper until parliamentary opposition forces a retreat.

23 April 1942

Beginning of so-called Baedeker Blitz on English provincial towns, mainly chosen for their historic and cultural significance; Exeter, Bath, Canterbury, Lincoln and York along with several coastal towns were targeted. Attacks continue sporadically until 6 June.

1 July 1942

The basic civilian petrol ration was abolished, making fuel unavailable to private car owners.

15 November 1942

Church bells were rung all over the United Kingdom for the first time since May 1940, in celebration of victory at the Second Battle of El Alamein.

1 December 1942

Sir William Beveridge's Report on Social Insurance and Allied Services published.

The Ministry of Labour reports that 1942 strikes cost 1,527,000 working days, as compared with 1,079,000 in 1941.

== 1943 ==
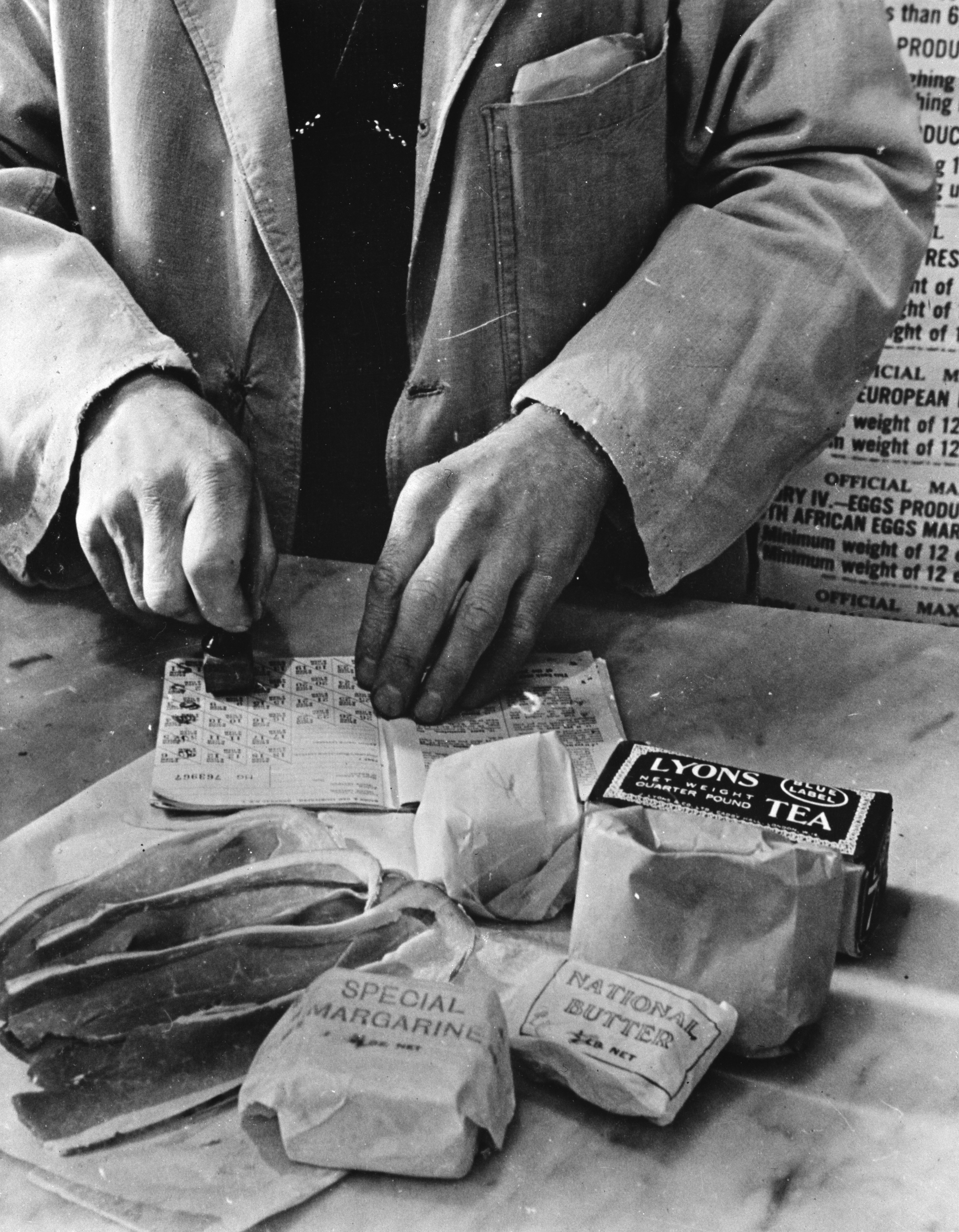
Civilian rationing: A shopkeeper cancels the coupons in a British housewife's ration book in 1943

18 February 1943

The House of Commons votes, 335 to 119, against a Labour amendment demanding the creation of a Social Security Ministry and immediate implementation of the Beveridge report. The government has approved the plan "in principle" but called for a delay until the war is over.

19 February 1943:

The Labour Party National Executive Committee rejects the Communist Party's application for affiliation saying it must carry out decisions of the Comintern in Moscow, that it has shown "complete irresponsibility in British politics" and because "its general outlook is entirely out of harmony with the philosophy and objectives of the Labour Party."

7 April 1943

The Government releases a White Paper by John Maynard Keynes, announcing its post-war currency stabilisation plan designed to provide an international banking system.

12 April 1943

The Chancellor of the Exchequer presents a budget of £5.8 billion with 56% to be raised from current revenue; the deficit would be £2.8 billion of which £2.2 will be borrowed at home.

29 July 1943

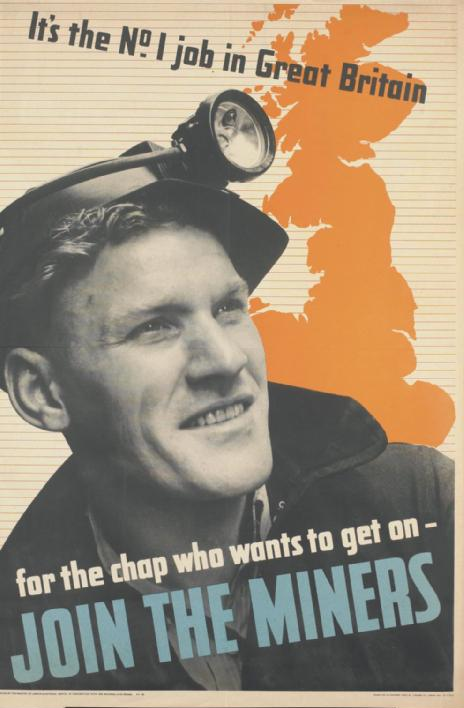
A recruitment poster for men to work in coal mining. The shortage of miners was solved from December 1943 by conscripts being chosen by ballot to be Bevin Boys.

Labour Minister Ernest Bevin announces that women from 19 to 50 will be called for work in plane and munitions plants. Men eligible for military service may choose work in coal mines.

23 September 1943

The Ministry of Health reports that 1942 births totaled 654,039 versus 480,137 in 1941; deaths 66,811 versus 55,043. Infant mortality was 49 per 1,000, the lowest on record for Britain.

14 December 1943

The first of 33 fortnightly ballot draws for the compulsory recruitment of men for coal mining, who would otherwise have been conscripted into the Armed Forces. These recruits would become known as "Bevin Boys".

20 December 1943

Villages in the South Hams area of Devon were compulsorily evacuated to create a training area for the planned D-Day landings. Also evacuated were the villages of Imber in Wiltshire and Tyneham in Dorset. The inhabitants of the last two have never been allowed to return.

== 1944 ==
21 January 1944

Start of Operation Steinbock or the "Baby Blitz", a Luftwaffe night bombing campaign against southern England, which continued until May 1944.

10 March 1944

R.A. Butler's Education Act passed, reorganizing Britain's school system under the tripartite system.

22 to 28 April 1944

During Exercise Tiger an American training exercise for D-Day landings on Utah Beach in Slapton Sands, Devon, a German attack on 28 April kills 746 US Army and Navy servicemen.

12 June 1944

First V-1 flying bomb attack on London.

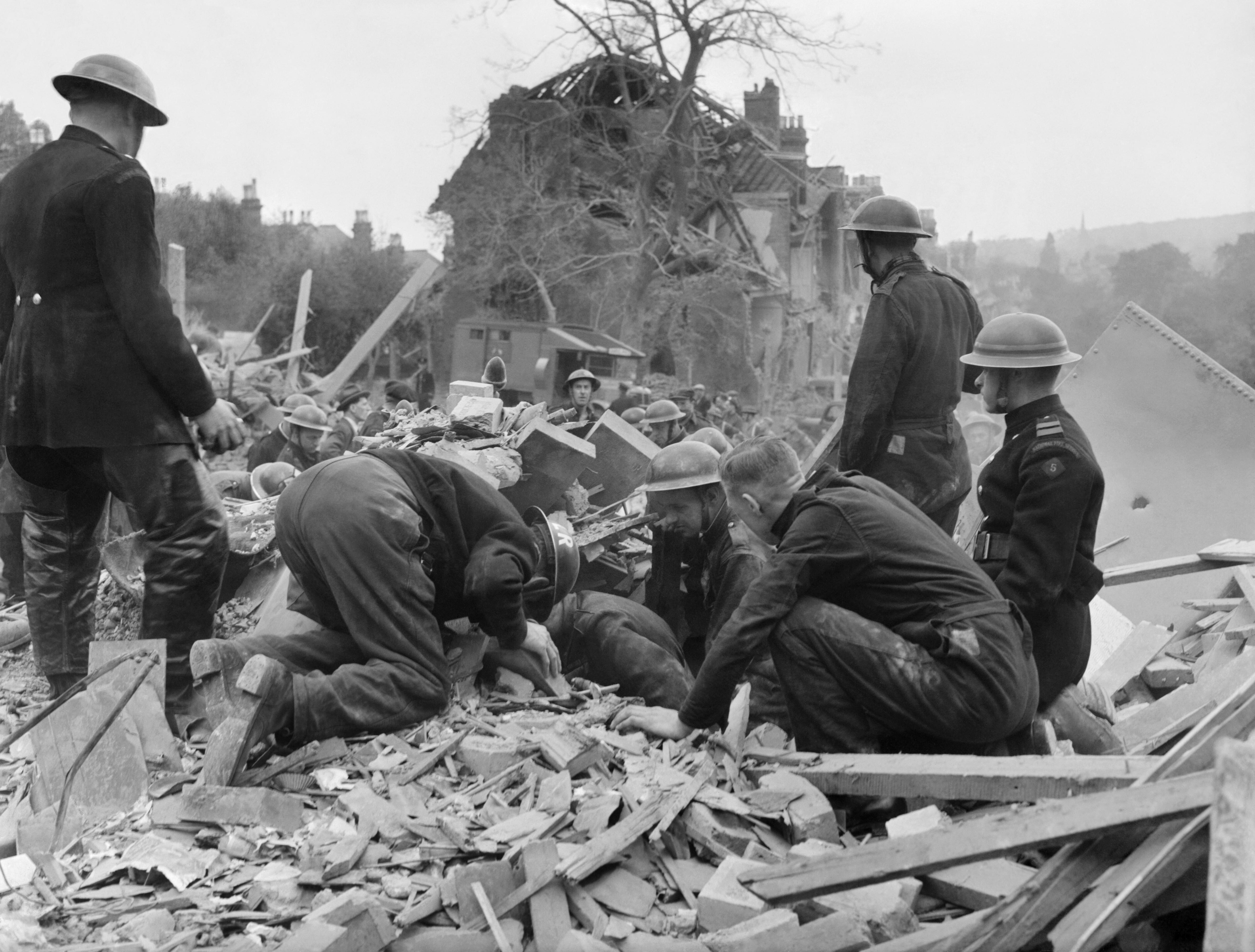
Civil Defence rescue teams search a large pile of rubble following a V-1 flying bomb attack in Upper Norwood, London.

July to September 1944

Final wave of evacuation (codenamed "Rivulet") of children from London to the English Midlands and West Country.

8 September 1944

First V-2 rocket attack on London.

17 September 1944

The Blackout is replaced by a partial 'dim-out'.

22 September 1944

Ernest Bevin announces the government's plan for eventual military demobilisation.

3 December 1944

The Home Guard is stood down.

== 1945 ==
1 February 1945

Part-time members of the National Fire Service are stood down.

27 March 1945

Last V-2 attack on London.

29 March 1945

Last V-1 flying bomb attack on London.

2 May 1945

Civil Defence Service is stood down.

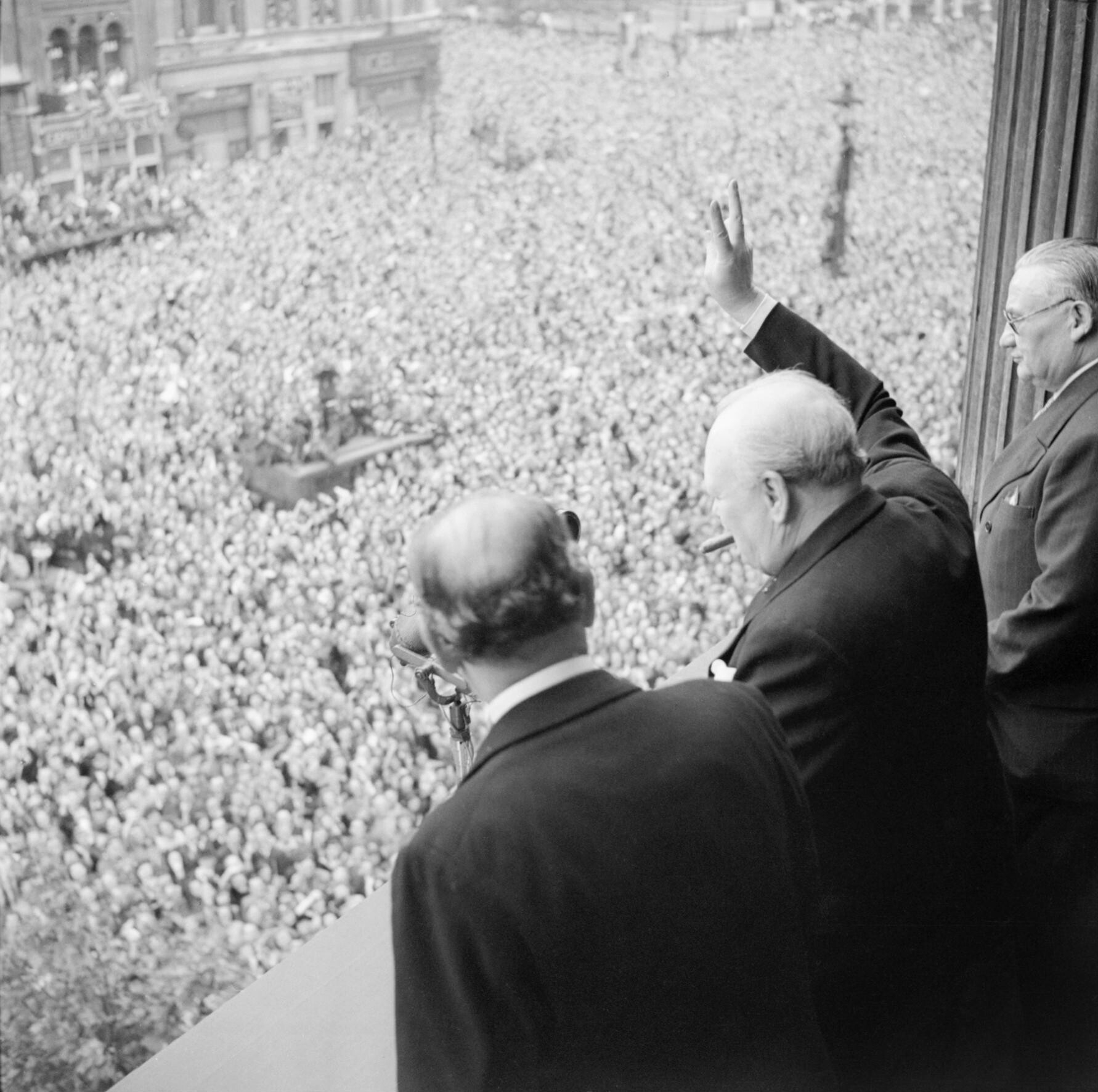
Churchill waves to crowds in Whitehall on Victory in Europe Day, 8 May 1945.

8 May 1945

VE Day.

9 May 1945

Liberation of the German-occupied Channel Islands takes place.

23 May 1945

The Labour Party members of the coalition government resign in order to prepare for the upcoming general election. Churchill appoints a largely Conservative caretaker government.

16 June 1945

The Family Allowances Act passed. Mothers will receive a tax-free cash payment for each child in their care. This is the first time in Britain that a state payment has gone directly to a wife rather than her husband.

18 June 1945

Demobilisation of the armed forces begins.

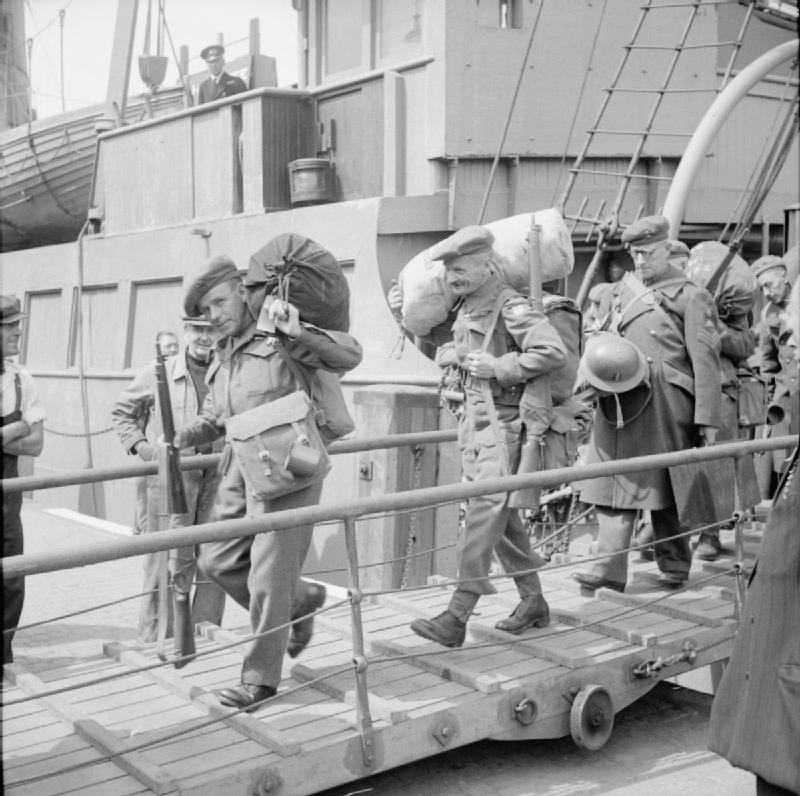
Demobilised troops disembark at Dover, 1945.

5 July 1945

General election voting takes place in the UK. The ballots are then sealed for three weeks to allow the collection and counting of overseas service votes.

26 July 1945

The Labour Party wins the general election with a historic landslide. Clement Attlee becomes Prime Minister and forms a new government.

15 August 1945

VJ Day.

== See also ==
- Mass-Observation
