= Never was so much owed by so many to so few =

1940 speech by Winston Churchill

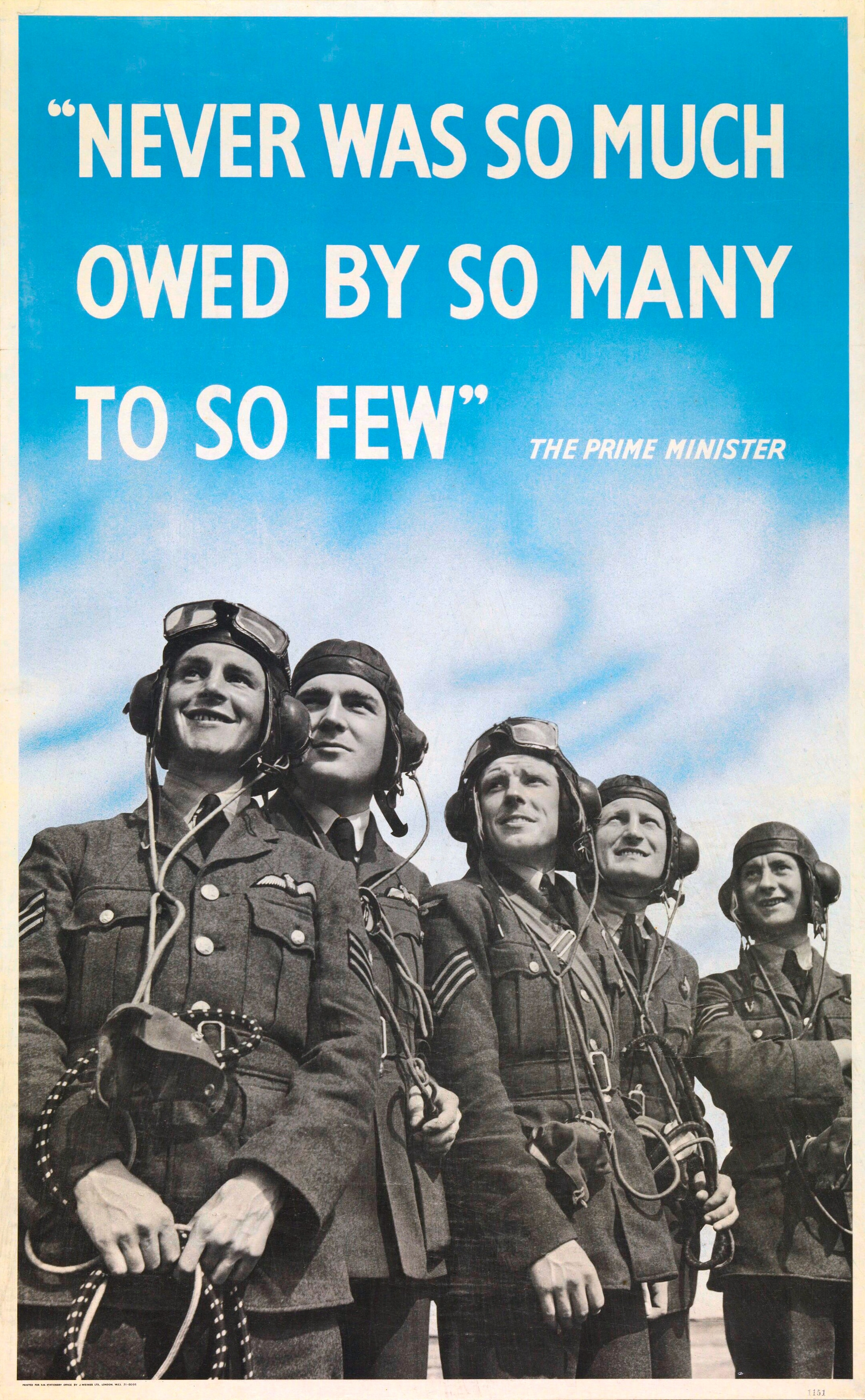
World War II poster containing the famous lines by Winston Churchill – all pictured are members of Bomber command

"Never was so much owed by so many to so few" (Note: The speech has also been called "The Few") was a wartime speech delivered to the House of Commons of the United Kingdom by British prime minister Winston Churchill on 20 August 1940. The name stems from the specific line in the speech, "Never in the field of human conflict was so much owed by so many to so few", referring to the ongoing efforts of the Royal Air Force and other Allied aircrew who were fighting in the Battle of Britain, the pivotal air battle with the German Luftwaffe.

The speech came amidst German plans for an invasion. At the end of June 1940, the Luftwaffe had a large numerical superiority over the Royal Air Force, with around 2,550 planes compared to the only 750 planes of the RAF. Pilots who fought in the Battle of Britain have been known as "the Few" ever since, at times being specifically commemorated for Battle of Britain Day, on 15 September. The speech has become one of Churchill's most famous, along with "we shall fight on the beaches", "their finest hour", and "blood, toil, tears, and sweat".

== Background ==
Churchill apparently first said the phrase to Major general Hastings Ismay after exiting the Battle of Britain Bunker at RAF Uxbridge on 16 August, four days before the speech was given. He had been visiting the No. 11 Group RAF operations room during the day of a battle, where at one point every squadron in the group was engaged while more waves of German planes were crossing the coast. After the fighting had slowed that evening and Churchill and Ismay had departed for Chequers, Churchill said, "Don't speak to me; I have never been so moved." Several minutes later, he told Ismay, "Never in the field of human conflict was so much owed by so many to so few."

The speech was given as the United Kingdom prepared for an impending German invasion. Near the end of June 1940, codebreakers at Bletchley Park deciphered a message containing a request from a Flak Corps unit for detailed maps of the UK, suggesting that the Germans intended to land mobile anti-aircraft guns in Great Britain and Ireland. However, Adolf Hitler knew that any invasion attempt would be successful only if the Royal Air Force was weakened or destroyed.

== Speech ==
Churchill's speech lasted nearly fifty minutes, in which he first stated "Almost a year has passed since the war began, and it is natural for us, I think, to pause on our journey at this milestone and survey the dark, wide field" going on to say that, so far, there had been many fewer casualties than at the same point in the First World War, stating that the war was not a "prodigious slaughter", but instead a "conflict of strategy, of organisation, of technical apparatus, of science, mechanics and morale".

The British casualties in the first 12 months of the Great War amounted to 365,000. In this war, I am thankful to say, British killed, wounded, prisoners and missing, including civilians, do not exceed 92,000, and of these a large proportion are alive as prisoners of war. Looking more widely around, one may say that throughout all Europe, for one man killed or wounded in the first year perhaps five were killed or wounded in 1914–15.

Churchill stated that "It is our intention to maintain and enforce a strict blockade not only of Germany but of Italy, France and all the other countries that have fallen into the German power".

Contrasting the fall of Europe under the Nazis, Churchill said "Let us see what has happened on the other side of the scales. The British nation and the British Empire finding themselves alone, stood undismayed against disaster. No one flinched or wavered; nay, some who formerly thought of peace, now think only of war. Our people are united and resolved, as they have never been before. Death and ruin have become small things compared with the shame of defeat or failure in duty. We cannot tell what lies ahead. It may be that even greater ordeals lie before us. We shall face whatever is coming to us. We are sure of ourselves and of our cause and here then is the supreme fact which has emerged in these months of trial"

He then spoke about Britain's military preparedness with respect to the Army and Navy. In turning to the air war, he mentions the "vast and admirable system of salvage, directed by the Ministry of Aircraft Production, ensures the speediest return to the fighting line of damaged machines, and the most provident and speedy use of all the spare parts and material" He then states that production of aircraft had increased significantly and would "We hope, we believe" that the United Kingdom could "continue the air struggle indefinitely and as long as the enemy pleases...". He praised British fighter pilots and aircrews, using the phrase that he had first said several days before:

The gratitude of every home in our Island, in our Empire, and indeed throughout the world, except in the abodes of the guilty, goes out to the British airmen who, undaunted by odds, unwearied in their constant challenge and mortal danger, are turning the tide of world war by their prowess and by their devotion. Never in the field of human conflict was so much owed by so many to so few.

While the speech is most well remembered for its praise of fighter pilots, it also commended bomber crews for their work and urged the public not to forget their actions.

All hearts go out to the fighter pilots, whose brilliant actions we see with our own eyes day after day; but we must never forget that all the time, night after night, month after month, our bomber squadrons travel far into Germany, find their targets in the darkness by the highest navigational skill, aim their attacks, often under the heaviest fire, often with serious loss, with deliberate careful discrimination, and inflict shattering blows upon the whole of the technical and war-making structure of the Nazi power.

— HC Deb 20 August 1940 vol 364 cc1167

He commented on his government's decision to withdraw its forces from Somaliland the week before, explaining that the British position was untenable due to the French decision to surrender. Churchill also defended the blockade of Germany and its occupied territories, acknowledging that the blockade could cause suffering but laying the blame on the Nazis. He pledged to give food, aid, and relief to occupied countries once they had been "wholly cleared of German forces", helping to lay the groundwork for post-war relief programmes.

The final part of the speech was about the destroyers-for-bases deal, in which Britain gave the United States 99-year leases for military bases in the Caribbean and Newfoundland in exchange for fifty American destroyers. No mention was made of the US giving the UK destroyers, and the decision was presented as a goodwill gesture in the interests of mutual security instead of a direct trade of British territories for ships.

Churchill ended on the subject of cooperation "Undoubtedly this process means that these two great organisations of the English-speaking democracies, the British Empire and the United States, will have to be somewhat mixed up together in some of their affairs for mutual and general advantage. For my own part, looking out upon the future, I do not view the process with any misgivings. I could not stop it if I wished; no one can stop it. Like the Mississippi, it just keeps rolling along. Let it roll. Let it roll on full flood, inexorable, irresistible, benignant, to broader lands and better days."

== Legacy ==
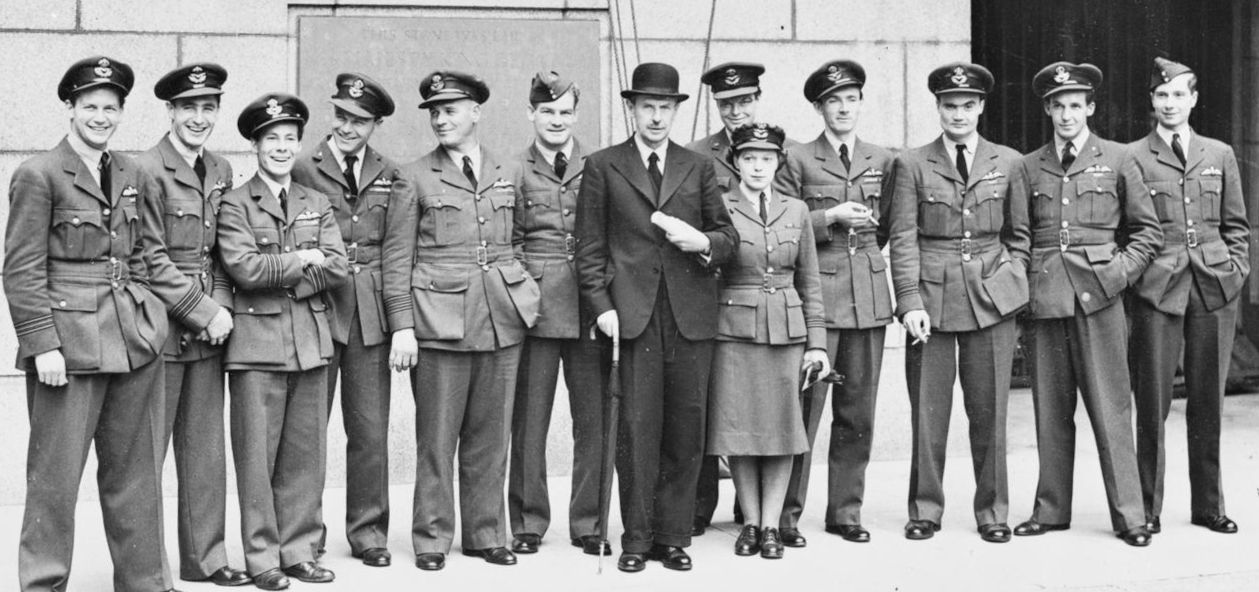
Pilots who fought in the Battle of Britain have since been known as "the Few".

The speech is well remembered for Churchill's use of the phrase "the few" when referring to Allied aircrew defending the United Kingdom; since then, they have been referred to as "The Few". Nearly 3,000 aircrew from the United Kingdom, the Commonwealth, and other Allied countries took part in the Battle of Britain; one-third of them were either killed or wounded. They have been honoured with ceremonies and flypasts on the anniversary of Battle of Britain Day, most recently on the 80th, 75th, and 70th anniversaries.

In 1981, Australian printmaker James Swan changed the quote to "Never was so much owed to so many by so few" and replaced the airmen's faces by those of Australian politicians he deemed especially blameworthy.
