= This was their finest hour =

1940 speech by Winston Churchill

"This was their finest hour" was a speech delivered by Winston Churchill to the House of Commons of the United Kingdom on 18 June 1940, just over a month after he took over as Prime Minister at the head of an all-party coalition government.

It was the third of three speeches which he gave during the period of the Battle of France, after the "Blood, toil, tears and sweat" speech of 13 May and the "We shall fight on the beaches" speech of 4 June. "This was their finest hour" was made after France had sought an armistice on the evening of 16 June. (Note: Churchill had already made a short wireless broadcast on the afternoon of 17 June: We have become the sole champions now in arms to defend the world cause...We shall defend our Island home, and with the British Empire we shall fight on unconquerable until the curse of Hitler is lifted from the brows of mankind. We are sure that in the end all will come right.)

== Message ==
In his speech, Churchill justified the low level of support it had been possible to give to France since the Dunkirk evacuation, and reported the successful evacuation of most of the supporting forces. He resisted pressure to purge the coalition of appeasers, or otherwise indulge in recrimination. He reviewed the forces still available to prevent or repel any attempted invasion, (Note: Touching in passing upon (and making light of) the entry of Italy into the war on the side of Germany: We are also told that the Italian Navy is to come to gain sea superiority in these waters. If they seriously intend it, I shall only say that we shall be delighted to offer Signor Mussolini a free and safeguarded passage through the Straits of Gibraltar in order that he may play the part which he aspires to do. There is general curiosity in the British Fleet to find out whether the Italians are up to the level they were at in the last war or whether they have fallen off at all.) summing up the review as follows:

I have thought it right upon this occasion to give the House and the country some indication of the solid, practical grounds upon which we base our inflexible resolve to continue the war, and I can assure them that our professional advisers of the three Services unitedly advise that we should do so, and that there are good and reasonable hopes of final victory.

He reported messages of support from the Dominions (Note: Two versions exist of this portion of the speech, the version given in the on-line Hansard being considerably shorter.) and justified confidence in victory, even if it was not yet clear how that victory could be achieved.

In casting up this dread balance-sheet, contemplating our dangers with a disillusioned eye, I see great reason for intense vigilance and exertion, but none whatever for panic or despair. During the first four years of the last war the Allies experienced, ... nothing but disaster and disappointment, and yet at the end their morale was higher than that of the Germans, who had moved from one aggressive triumph to another. During that war we repeatedly asked ourselves the question, "How are we going to win?" and no one was able ever to answer it with much precision, until at the end, quite suddenly, quite unexpectedly, our terrible foe collapsed before us.

== Peroration ==
The peroration, even at a moment of great apparent danger to British national survival, talks not only of national survival and national interest but also of noble causes (freedom, Christian civilisation and the rights of small nations) for which Britain was fighting and for which Churchill thought the United States should and eventually would fight. (Note: In a Secret Session of the House two days later, Churchill gave his view that the USA would not support Britain if they thought it was down and out. The best chance of American intervention was the spectacle of Britain engaged in a heroic struggle. Already the US had promised Britain the fullest aid with munitions; after the US November elections, Churchill had no doubt, the whole English-speaking world would be in line together.) The War Illustrated published the speech with the title "'If the Empire lasts a thousand years men will say, this was their finest hour'".

However matters may go in France or with the French Government, or other French Governments, we in this Island and in the British Empire will never lose our sense of comradeship with the French people. If we are now called upon to endure what they have been suffering, we shall emulate their courage, and if final victory rewards our toils they shall share the gains, aye, and freedom shall be restored to all. We abate nothing of our just demands; not one jot or tittle do we recede. Czechs, Poles, Norwegians, Dutch, Belgians have joined their causes to our own. All these shall be restored. What General Weygand has called the Battle of France is over. I expect the Battle of Britain is about to begin. Upon this battle depends the survival of Christian civilisation. Upon it depends our own British life, and the long continuity of our institutions and our Empire. The whole fury and might of the enemy must very soon be turned on us. Hitler knows that he will have to break us in this island or lose the war. If we can stand up to him, all Europe may be freed and the life of the world may move forward into broad, sunlit uplands. But if we fail, then the whole world, including the United States, including all that we have known and cared for, will sink into the abyss of a new Dark Age made more sinister, and perhaps more protracted, by the lights of perverted science. Let us therefore brace ourselves to our duties, and so bear ourselves that, if the British Empire and its Commonwealth (Note: The online electronic Hansard has at this point 'the British Commonwealth and Empire'. As noted earlier, there are discrepancies in the references made to the Dominions.) last for a thousand years, men will still say, "This was their finest hour."

== Preparation and delivery ==
The speech was delivered to the Commons at 3:49 pm, and lasted 36 minutes. Churchill, as was his habit, made revisions to his 23-page typescript right up to and during the speech. The final passage of his typescript was laid out in blank verse format, which Churchill scholars consider reflective of the influence of the Psalms on his oratory style.

== See also ==
- Appeal of 18 June – one of the most famous speeches in French history, given the same day by Charles de Gaulle
- Never was so much owed by so many to so few – speech delivered to the House of Commons by Churchill on 20 August 1940
- The Darkest Hour
- Timeline of the United Kingdom home front during World War II
