= We shall fight on the beaches =

1940 speech by Winston Churchill

The famous 1949 recording of the speech. The original 1940 speech was never recorded; this is a retake for a Decca Records vinyl album containing Churchill's greatest speeches.

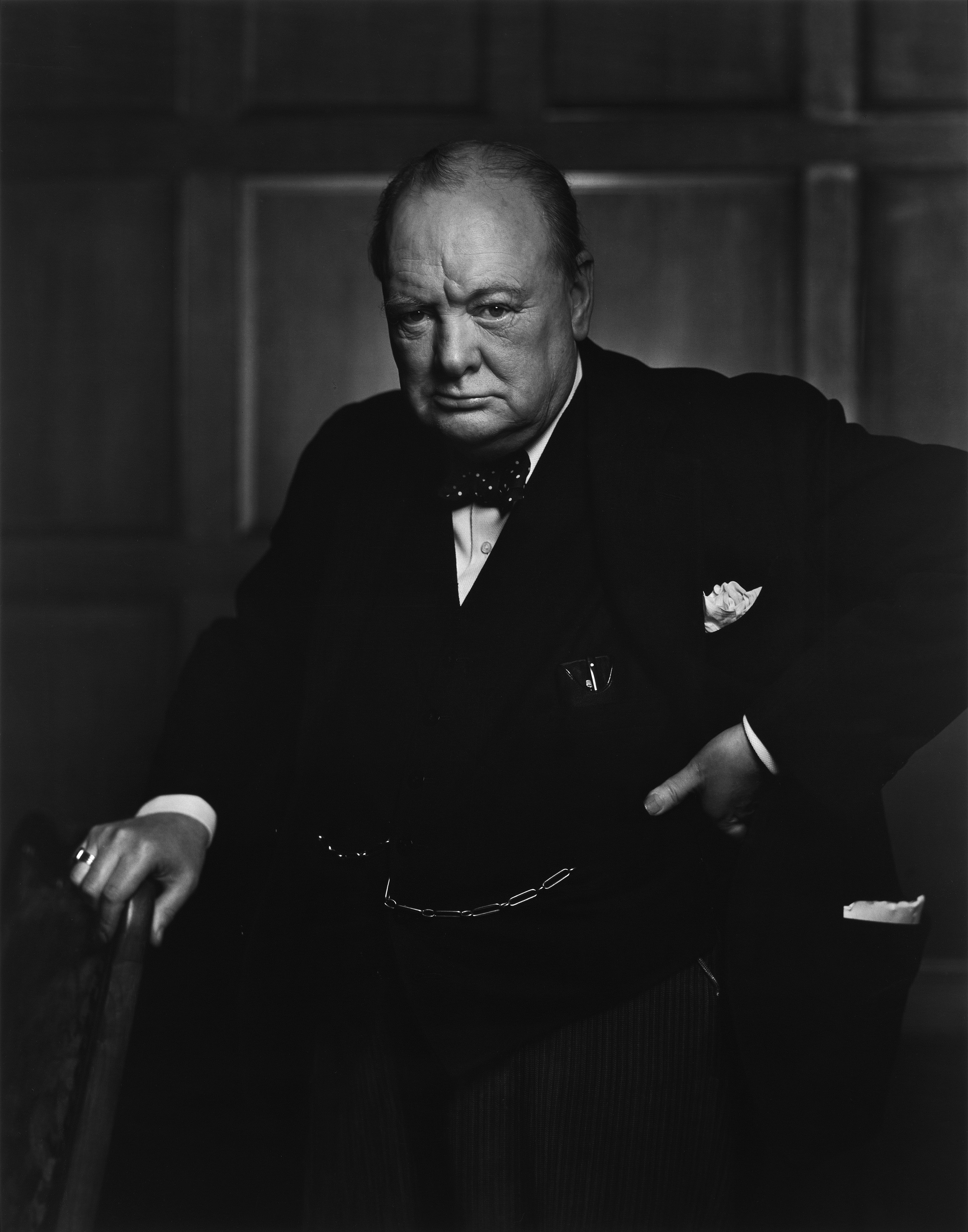
Churchill in 1941

"We shall fight on the beaches" was a speech delivered by the British prime minister Winston Churchill to the House of Commons of the Parliament of the United Kingdom on 4 June 1940. This was the second of three major speeches given by Churchill around the period of the Battle of France; the others are the "Blood, toil, tears and sweat" speech of 13 May 1940, and the "This was their finest hour" speech of 18 June 1940. Events developed dramatically over the five-week period, and although broadly similar in themes, each speech addressed a different military and diplomatic context.

In this speech, Churchill had to describe a great military disaster, and warn of a possible invasion attempt by Nazi Germany, without casting doubt on eventual victory. He also had to prepare his domestic audience for France's falling out of the war without in any way releasing France to do so, and wished to reiterate a policy and an aim unchanged – despite the intervening events – from his speech of 13 May, in which he had declared the goal of "victory, however long and hard the road may be".

== Background ==
Winston Churchill took over as Prime Minister on 10 May 1940, eight months after the outbreak of World War II in Europe. He had done so as the head of a multiparty coalition government, which had replaced the previous government (led by Neville Chamberlain) as a result of dissatisfaction with the conduct of the war, demonstrated by the Norway debate on the Allied evacuation of Southern Norway.

Coincidentally, the German Wehrmacht offensive in the Low Countries and France had begun on 10 May with the invasion of the Netherlands, Belgium and Luxembourg. Churchill had spoken to the House of Commons as Prime Minister for the first time on 13 May, to announce the formation of the new administration:

I would say to the House, as I said to those who have joined this Government: "I have nothing to offer but blood, toil, tears and sweat."

In that speech, he mentioned nothing about the military situation in France and the Low Countries.

Expecting that the German offensive would develop along much the same lines as it did in 1914, the lines of communication of the British Expeditionary Force (BEF) did not run through the "short crossing" Channel ports – Boulogne, Calais, Dunkirk, etc. – but rather through Dieppe and Le Havre. On 13 May, the Wehrmacht's attack through the Ardennes had reached the Meuse River at Sedan and then crossed it, breaking through the defences of the French Army. By 20 May, Wehrmacht armoured divisions had reached the coast of the English Channel at Abbeville, splitting the BEF and the French First Army from the main French forces.

The Wehrmacht next moved against the cut-off Allied forces, moving along the seacoast with only small Allied forces to resist them. After the capitulation of Belgium on 28 May, a gap had also appeared on the eastern flank of the Allied forces, which had been forced to retreat into a small pocket around the seaport of Dunkirk. From this pocket the bulk of the BEF and a considerable number of French troops had been evacuated in Operation Dynamo, but these troops had left behind virtually all of their heavy equipment (transport, tanks, artillery and ammunition). The French First Army had most of its units pocketed around Lille. Those of its units evacuated from Dunkirk were relanded in France, but saw no further action; they were still being reorganised in Brittany at the fall of France.

Churchill had made a brief statement to the Commons on 28 May reporting the Belgian capitulation, and concluding:

Meanwhile, the House should prepare itself for hard and heavy tidings. I have only to add that nothing which may happen in this battle can in any way relieve us of our duty to defend the world cause to which we have vowed ourselves; nor should it destroy our confidence in our power to make our way, as on former occasions in our history, through disaster and through grief to the ultimate defeat of our enemies.

He had promised a further statement of the military situation on 4 June, and indeed the major part of the speech is an account of military events – so far as they affected the BEF – since the German breakthrough at Sedan.

The German breakthrough had not been exploited southwards, and the French had improvised a relatively thinly held defensive line along the Aisne and the Somme. The British military evaluation was that this was unlikely to withstand any major attack by the Wehrmacht. In the air, the French were short of fighter planes, and the shortage was worsening due to their many losses in combat. The French military commanders had hence asked for additional British fighter squadrons to be sent into the fight in France. Politically, there were considerable doubts over the French willingness to continue the war, even in the absence of any further military catastrophes. Churchill had argued in favour of sending the fighter squadrons to France because he considered that that move would be vital to sustain French public morale, and also to give no excuse for the collapse of the French Army. That would possibly lead to a French government that would not only drop out of the war, but also become hostile to the United Kingdom. The British War Cabinet discussed this issue at meetings on 3 June and on the morning of 4 June, but it decided to take the advice of the Royal Air Force and the Secretary of State for Air, Sir Archibald Sinclair, that the British priority must be to prepare its own defences. The three squadrons present in France would be kept up to fighting strength, but no further squadrons could be spared for the Battle of France.

Despite relief that the bulk of the BEF had made it back to Britain, Mass-Observation reported civilian morale in many areas as zero, one observer claiming that everyone looked suicidal. Only half the population expected Britain to fight on, and the feelings of thousands were summed up as:

This is not our war – this is a war of the high-up people who use long words and have different feelings.

Therefore, when talking about the future course and conduct of the war in this speech, Churchill had to describe a great military disaster, and warn of a possible German invasion attempt, without casting doubt on eventual victory. He needed to prepare his domestic audience for France's departure from the war without in any way releasing France to do so. In his subsequent speech of 18 June, immediately after the French had sued for peace, Churchill said:

The military events which have happened during the past fortnight have not come to me with any sense of surprise. Indeed, I indicated a fortnight ago as clearly as I could to the House that the worst possibilities were open, and I made it perfectly clear then that whatever happened in France would make no difference to the resolve of Britain and the British Empire to fight on, if necessary for years, if necessary alone.

Finally, he needed to reiterate a policy and an aim unchanged – despite the intervening events – from his speech of 13 May, in which he had said:

We have before us an ordeal of the most grievous kind. We have before us many, many long months of struggle and of suffering. You ask, what is our policy? I will say: It is to wage war, by sea, land, and air, with all our might and with all the strength that God can give us; to wage war against a monstrous tyranny never surpassed in the dark, lamentable catalogue of human crime. That is our policy. You ask, what is our aim? I can answer in one word: It is victory, victory at all costs, victory in spite of all terror, victory, however long and hard the road may be.

=== Possible inspiration ===
S.L.A. Marshall commented that the speech may have partially been inspired by General Ferdinand Foch at the Doullens Conference, who reportedly asked Douglas Haig:

You aren't fighting? I would fight without a break. I would fight in front of Amiens. I would fight in Amiens. I would fight behind Amiens. I would fight all the time. I would never surrender.

Another source of inspiration might have been Georges Clemenceau who said, in June 1918:

Yes, the Germans can take Paris, that won't prevent me from making war. We will fight on the Loire, then on the Garonne if necessary and even in the Pyrenees. If at last we are driven off the Pyrenees, we will continue the war at sea and in Africa, but as for making peace, never! Don't they count on me for that.

== Peroration ==
The peroration is widely held to be one of the finest oratorical moments of the war and of Churchill's career.

Turning once again, and this time more generally, to the question of invasion, I would observe that there has never been a period in all these long centuries of which we boast when an absolute guarantee against invasion, still less against serious raids, could have been given to our people. In the days of Napoleon, of which I was speaking just now, the same wind which would have carried his transports across the Channel might have driven away the blockading fleet. There was always the chance, and it is that chance which has excited and befooled the imaginations of many Continental tyrants. Many are the tales that are told. We are assured that novel methods will be adopted, and when we see the originality of malice, the ingenuity of aggression, which our enemy displays, we may certainly prepare ourselves for every kind of novel stratagem and every kind of brutal and treacherous manœuvre. I think that no idea is so outlandish that it should not be considered and viewed with a searching, but at the same time, I hope, with a steady eye. We must never forget the solid assurances of sea power and those which belong to air power if it can be locally exercised.

I have, myself, full confidence that if all do their duty, if nothing is neglected, and if the best arrangements are made, as they are being made, we shall prove ourselves once more able to defend our island home, to ride out the storm of war, and to outlive the menace of tyranny, if necessary for years, if necessary alone. At any rate, that is what we are going to try to do. That is the resolve of His Majesty's Government – every man of them. That is the will of Parliament and the nation. The British Empire and the French Republic, linked together in their cause and in their need, will defend to the death their native soil, aiding each other like good comrades to the utmost of their strength.

Even though large tracts of Europe and many old and famous States have fallen or may fall into the grip of the Gestapo and all the odious apparatus of Nazi rule, we shall not flag or fail. We shall go on to the end. We shall fight in France, we shall fight on the seas and oceans, we shall fight with growing confidence and growing strength in the air, we shall defend our island, whatever the cost may be. We shall fight on the beaches, we shall fight on the landing grounds, we shall fight in the fields and in the streets, we shall fight in the hills; we shall never surrender. And even if, which I do not for a moment believe, this island or a large part of it were subjugated and starving, then our Empire beyond the seas, armed and guarded by the British Fleet, would carry on the struggle, until, in God's good time, the New World, with all its power and might, steps forth to the rescue and the liberation of the Old.

It is often said that in the sentence that begins "We shall fight on the beaches" and ends in "surrender", only the last word – "surrender" – does not have Old English roots.

== Reception ==
It is said that immediately after giving the speech, Churchill muttered to a colleague, "And we'll fight them with the butt ends of broken beer bottles because that's bloody well all we've got!" Nonetheless, Churchill impressed his listeners and the speech was immediately recognised to be historic. Jock Colville, one of Churchill's secretaries, noted in his diary "A magnificent oration, which obviously moved the House." Chips Channon, a Conservative MP, wrote in his diary "he was eloquent and oratorical and used magnificent English; several Labour members cried." A Labour MP, Josiah Wedgwood, friend and admirer of Churchill since the Dardanelles campaign, wrote to him, "My dear Winston. That was worth 1,000 guns and the speeches of 1,000 years."

Unlike his subsequent "This was their finest hour" speech, Churchill's 4 June speech in the House of Commons was not repeated by him as a live radio broadcast that evening. Rather, as with his earlier "Blood, toil, tears and sweat" speech, extracts were read by the newsreader on that evening's BBC news broadcast. They made a great impression on Vita Sackville-West:

Even repeated by the announcer, it sent shivers (not of fear) down my spine. I think that one of the reasons why one is stirred by his Elizabethan phrases is that one feels the whole massive backing of power and resolve behind them, like a great fortress: they are never words for words' sake.

The next year American journalist H. R. Knickerbocker wrote that its words "deserve to be memorized by us all", observing that "With Churchill's picture these words are placarded in homes and offices throughout the British Empire."

== Recordings ==
No audio record was made at the time of the original speech; Churchill only produced an audio recording in 1949, by repeating his previous oration. Despite this, many people after the war misremembered that they had heard Churchill speaking on the radio in 1940 when all there had been were BBC news reports that quoted his words.

In 1984, English heavy metal band Iron Maiden mixed a section of this recording at the beginning of the video for their song "Aces High", which is inspired by the Battle of Britain, also using the recording as the introduction to the song when performed on stage. Iron Maiden also use this section as a beginning for many live shows namely during their 1984 World Slavery Tour. In "Fool's Overture", the closing track of Supertramp's 1977 album Even in the Quietest Moments..., some excerpts of the speech are heard along with London's Big Ben chiming.

== Popular myths ==
Two popular myths are commonly propagated in newspapers and blogs. In 1972, actor Norman Shelley claimed to have recorded the speech impersonating Churchill. They featured in a 1994 book, 2000 Economist article, and an Atlantic article from 2002 by Christopher Hitchens, containing the following claims:

Myth 1: It is often claimed that the speech was delivered by Norman Shelley, likely by virtue of Churchill being inebriated. Despite Shelley creating a phonograph recording in 1942 of a different speech, he did not impersonate Churchill during the actual oration.

Myth 2: The most remembered part of the speech was supposedly inspired by a radio address by former British prime minister, Neville Chamberlain, which included the following sentences:

If the enemy does try to invade this country we will fight him in the air and on the sea; we will fight him on the beaches with every weapon we have. He may manage here and there to make a breakthrough: if he does we will fight him on every road, in every village, and in every house, until he or we are utterly destroyed.

This frequently cited Chamberlain quote is found in the 1946 book The Life of Neville Chamberlain by Keith Feiling; however, referring to a "June 30 [...] broadcast", which would date it after Churchill’s speech.

== See also ==
- Churchill war ministry
- Timeline of the United Kingdom home front during World War II
- Day of Infamy speech
