= Blood, toil, tears and sweat =

Phrase used by Winston Churchill in 1940

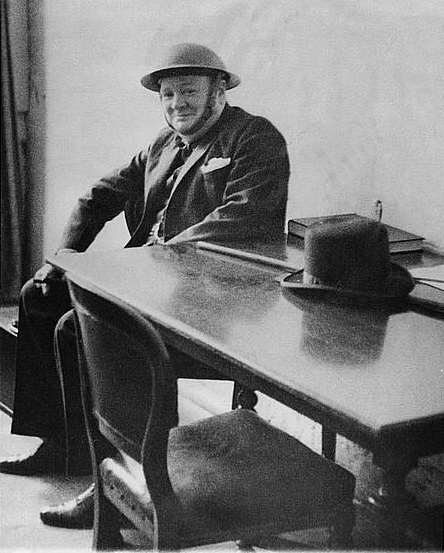
Churchill, protected by a military helmet, in 1940

"Blood, toil, tears and sweat" was a phrase made famous in a speech given by Winston Churchill to the House of Commons of the Parliament of the United Kingdom on 13 May 1940; the speech itself is sometimes known by that name.

== Background ==
This was Churchill's first speech since becoming prime minister. It was made on 13 May 1940 to the House of Commons after having been offered the King's commission the previous Friday, to become Prime Minister of the United Kingdom in the first year of World War II. Churchill had replaced Neville Chamberlain on 10 May, and in this speech he asked the House to declare its confidence in his Government. The motion passed unanimously. This was the first of three speeches which he gave during the period of the Battle of France, which commenced with the German invasion of the Low Countries on 10 May.

== History ==
Churchill had used similar phrases earlier, such as "Their sweat, their tears, their blood" in 1931, and "new structures of national life erected upon blood, sweat, and tears" in 1939.

Churchill's sentence, "I have nothing to offer but blood, toil, tears and sweat", has been called a paraphrase of one uttered on 2 July 1849 by Giuseppe Garibaldi when rallying his revolutionary forces in Rome: "I offer hunger, thirst, forced marches, battle, and death." As a young man, Churchill had considered writing a biography of Garibaldi. The circumstances under which Garibaldi made that speech—with the revolutionary Roman Republic being overwhelmed and Garibaldi needing to maintain the morale of his troops towards a highly hazardous retreat through the Apennine Mountains—was in some ways comparable to Britain's situation with France being overwhelmed by the German offensive.

Theodore Roosevelt had uttered a phrase similar to Churchill's in an address to the United States Naval War College on 2 June 1897, following his appointment as federal Assistant Secretary of the Navy: "Every man among us is more fit to meet the duties and responsibilities of citizenship because of the perils over which, in the past, the nation has triumphed; because of the blood and sweat and tears, the labor and the anguish, through which, in the days that have gone, our forefathers moved on to triumph." Churchill's line has been called a "direct quotation" from Roosevelt's speech. Churchill, a man with an American mother and a keen soldier, was likely to have read works by Theodore Roosevelt, who was a widely published military historian; it is also possible he read the speech after being appointed First Lord of the Admiralty, a position similar to Roosevelt's.

Other versions of the phrase are "It [poetry] is forged slowly and painfully, link by link, with blood and sweat and tears" (Lord Alfred Douglas, 1919), "Blood, sweat, and tear-wrung millions" (Lord Byron, 1823), and "... mollifie/ It with thy teares, or sweat, or blood" (John Donne, 1611). In Latin, Cicero and Livy had used the phrase "sweat and blood".

== Excerpts ==
On Friday evening last I received His Majesty's Commission to form a new Administration. It was the evident wish and will of Parliament and the nation that this should be conceived on the broadest possible basis and that it should include all parties, both those who supported the late Government and also the parties of the Opposition. I have completed the most important part of this task. A War Cabinet has been formed of five Members, representing, with the Opposition Liberals, the unity of the nation. The three party Leaders have agreed to serve, either in the War Cabinet or in high executive office...

Sir, to form an Administration of this scale and complexity is a serious undertaking in itself, but it must be remembered that we are in the preliminary stage of one of the greatest battles in history, that we are in action at many points, in Norway and in Holland, that we have to be prepared in the Mediterranean, that the air battle is continuous, and that many preparations ... have to be made here at home. ...

In this crisis I hope I may be pardoned if I do not address the House at any length to-day. I hope that any of my friends and colleagues, or former colleagues, who are affected by the political reconstruction, will make allowance, all allowance, for any lack of ceremony with which it has been necessary to act. I would say to the House, as I said to those who have joined this Government: "I have nothing to offer but blood, toil, tears and sweat."

We have before us an ordeal of the most grievous kind. We have before us many, many long months of struggle and of suffering. You ask, what is our policy? I will say: It is to wage war, by sea, land and air, with all our might and with all the strength that God can give us; to wage war against a monstrous tyranny never surpassed in the dark and lamentable catalogue of human crime. That is our policy. You ask, what is our aim? I can answer in one word: it is victory, victory at all costs, victory in spite of all terror, victory, however long and hard the road may be, for without victory there is no survival. Let that be realised; no survival for the British Empire, no survival for all that the British Empire has stood for, no survival for the urge and impulse of the ages, that mankind will move forward towards its goal. But I take up my task with buoyancy and hope. I feel sure that our cause will not be suffered to fail among men. At this time I feel entitled to claim the aid of all, and I say, "Come then, let us go forward together with our united strength."

— Hansard, House of Commons, 13 May 1940,

== Reaction ==
Churchill had not been the preferred choice of most Conservatives to succeed Chamberlain, but the motion on 13 May "That this House welcomes the formation of a Government representing the united and inflexible resolve of the nation to prosecute the war with Germany to a victorious conclusion" passed unanimously. He had been unpopular in many circles since the 1930s and MPs had ignored or heckled speeches in which he denounced the prime minister's appeasement policy toward Germany; even others who opposed Chamberlain avoided him. One historian has described the speech's effect on Parliament, however, as "electrifying ... He was still speaking at the House of Commons, but it was now listening, and cheering."

Churchill himself, however, subsequently held that many Conservative MPs had still regarded him with reserve and it was not until his speech of 4 July 1940 announcing British action against the French fleet at Mers-el-Kébir that he could feel he had the full support of the whole House. Other great speeches followed, including the "We shall fight on the beaches" speech of 4 June and the "This was their finest hour" speech of 18 June.

== Legacy ==
On 26 April 2013, the Bank of England announced that beneath a portrait of Churchill the phrase "I have nothing to offer but blood, toil, tears and sweat" was to adorn the new 5-pound note. It was issued in September 2016.

== See also ==
- "We shall fight on the beaches"
- "Never was so much owed by so many to so few"
